= Guaidó administration–Silvercorp agreement =

The General Services Agreement Attachments signed between Guaidó government officials and Silvercorp USA in October 2019. Vergara and Rendón, who have since resigned their positions on the Strategy Committee, acknowledge they signed the agreement and the attachments, but say it was quickly cancelled.

The Guaidó administration–Silvercorp agreement between Jordan Goudreau's private security firm Silvercorp USA and the administration of Juan Guaidó was signed in October 2019. The operation occurred in the broader context of an ongoing presidential crisis beginning in January 2019 over the identity of the legitimate president of Venezuela – Nicolás Maduro or Guaidó. Goudreau's plan was for expatriate Venezuelan military living in Colombia to enter the country by sea, capture Maduro and other high-level figures in his administration, and expel them from the country.

Following the 2020 Venezuelan Operation Gideon events in May, news outlets published the agreement, the terms of which provided that Silvercorp would organize an operation to remove Maduro and establish the Guaidó administration in exchange for a share of future oil sale profits. Members of Guaidó's Strategy Committee acknowledged signing the agreement but said that they had withdrawn from the agreement and cut off ties with Silvercorp and Goudreau in November 2019. Guaidó was reported to have signed the agreement, which he denied. Guaidó and his representatives denied being involved in the events of 3–4 May.

== Negotiations ==
Guaidó established a Strategic Committee in August 2019 and named J. J. Rendón, described by Neuman as "a Venezuelan political consultant living in Miami, who had a reputation as a master of the political dark arts," to head it. The committee was tasked with exploring possibilities and testing scenarios for the removal of Maduro from power, with methods ranging from increased international condemnation of Maduro to armed action. Sources told the Wall Street Journal that Leopoldo López and others had "considered at least six proposals from private security contractors to carry out military incursions to spur a rebellion in Venezuela's armed forces and topple the authoritarian president". Rendón stated that he was told by Guaidó that "all options were on the table, and under the table." Sucre stated that such discourse, together with a speech by an unnamed author proclaiming "that there is no electoral exit before a criminal government", could lead to "any possible means to force Maduro's departure".

The committee studied the universal enemy doctrine and analyzed the unsuccessful 1961 Bay of Pigs Invasion of Cuba. One scenario considered was the removal of Maduro by capturing him and his high-ranking officials and sending them to another country for prosecution. After reviewing all legal means of removing Maduro, the group adopted the position that the Venezuelan Constitution, the United Nations Convention against Transnational Organized Crime, and other treaties provided justification for pursuing regime change. In an interview with Vice News, Rendón stated that the committee studied options to "pick [Maduro] up, like they have bounty hunters in the United States, and present him to justice". BBC News wrote that Rendon said Silvercorp was the only military contractor they spoke with, although they researched others; The Guardian reported that Rendón said the committee had contacted numerous groups about "all legal means of ousting Maduro" which demanded prices from US$500 million to US$1.5 billion.

According to Rendón, Goudreau initially proposed a restructuring of the Venezuelan armed forces "after freeing the country". By 7 September 2019, Goudreau made a sales pitch to Rendón proposing the capture of Maduro and his officials and their extraction from Venezuela. Goudreau offered a self-financed plan at a lower cost of $212.9 million, backed by future oil sales. On 10 October 2019, Goudreau text messaged Rendón saying, "Washington is fully aware of your direct participation in the project and I don't want them to lose faith." Further text messages displayed Maduro's inner circle warehouses supposedly filled with US dollars; Goudreau was offered 14% of funds recovered during the operation. Rendón said that he initially had faith in Goudreau, as he "looked clean" after a background check.

== General Services Agreement ==
A General Services Agreement between Venezuela and Silvercorp was signed in Washington, D.C., on 16 October 2019, by Goudreau on behalf of Silvercorp and Rendón and Sergio Vergara, on behalf of the Guaidó administration, with the contract – "contingent on funding and other conditions" according to The Washington Post – discussing what Neuman described as an invasion of Venezuela and what Vox said "explicitly outline[d] what was agreed to: a coup." Rendón described the agreement as a "trial balloon" and a test that never had approval for implementation; DeFronzo calls it an "exploratory agreement". Mijares writes that "Rendón admitted he had had contact with Goudreau's group, but the operation was never paid for or approved". Luis Vicente León of the Datanálisis consulting described the agreement as "unpresentable" since the Guaidó administration had promised Silvercorp public funds without the legislative approval of the National Assembly.

"Operation Resolution" stated the "Service Provider Group will advise and assist Partner Group in Planning and executing and operation to capture/detain/remove Nicolas Maduro (heretoafter "Primary Objective"), remove the current Regime, and install the recognized Venezuelan President Juan Guaido." (Note: The Agreement defined the "Service Provider" (Silvercorp) as "advisors", the "Partner Group" as "exiled Venezuelan military", and a "Task Group" as the "combination of [Silvercorp] personnel and Partner Group".) The agreement and attachments established a chain of command: Juan Guaidó as commander-in-chief, Vergara as overall project supervisor, and Rendón as chief strategy officer and was witnessed by Manuel J. Retureta, a Cuban-born attorney based in Washington, D.C.

The agreement's rules of engagement (ROE) included protecting Venezuela's cultural sites (unless used for illicit activity), infrastructure and economic objects. They designated numerous enemies – Maduro, Diosdado Cabello, their supporters, violent colectivos, the Revolutionary Armed Forces of Colombia (FARC), the National Liberation Army (ELN), and Hezbollah – who could be "neutralized" if necessary. Silvercorp personnel were to serve as advisors not combatants; they were not contracted to act unless with "authorized Venezuelan teams" and were not to engage in unilateral actions. The ROE included riot control guidelines to "respond with proportionality of force and non-lethal anti-riot equipment". Non-Venezuelans were to appear as Venezuelans in an effort "to protect the face of the project as Venezuelan only". The contract permitted Silvercorp to detain civilians on reasonable suspicion of criminal activity or who were interfering with the operation.

Within a week of signing the agreement, Goudreau said he secured funding for the operation, but reportedly provided no proof. The agreement gave Silvercorp 45 days to prepare. According to Tal Cual, Rendon's version is that during this period, "it was demonstrated that Goudreau had not complied with what was established and therefore the contract was annulled". Rendón told reporters that shortly after signing the agreement, Goudreau began acting suspicious, failing to provide evidence of financial backing, the promised 800 men, and demanding immediate payment of the $1.5 million retainer that was due within a five-day period according to the agreement. Rendón transferred Goudreau $50,000 from his personal account for "expenses" (confirmed publicly by Goudreau) to buy more time, but the relationship between the two quickly deteriorated. Speaking after the landing attempt, Goudreau stated the operation was forced to rely on donations because he was not paid by Guaidó's team.

On 8 November 2019, Goudreau met Rendón at the latter's penthouse, where a heated argument took place. According to Rendón, he and other Guaidó administration officials "considered the operation dead" after this encounter in early November. Rendón attempted to provide a letter canceling the agreement, though Gourdeau refused. Rendón's interpretation of the contract, in the words of Vice magazine, was that the agreement was an "exploratory contract, with clauses and stipulations that needed to be met in order for the whole coup to be backed, rather than a guaranteed and greenlit deal"; to that extent, he was unconcerned about a lawsuit later filed by Goudreau to enforce the contract. He stated that Guaidó knew only the rough outlines of an "exploratory plan" but grew suspicious of Goudreau based on committee feedback. Rendón said that "We were all having red flags, and the president was not comfortable with this."

=== Signature dispute ===
The General Services Agreement document that was allegedly signed by Guaidó. Guaidó has denied he signed the agreement and accused the Maduro government of forgery.

It was reported that Juan Guaidó himself signed the contract. Guaidó and his allies denied that he signed the contract directly, though he was listed as the main party twice and had his representatives sign off. Goudreau provided a copy of a General Services Agreement purporting to bear Guaidó's signature and after the May events, Goudreau disclosed what purported to be a copy of a preliminary contract containing Guaidó's signature, whose first and last page were missing. He provided a covert recording of "what appears to be", according to the Miami Herald, a video call with Guaidó on 16 October 2019 in which Guaidó purportedly says, "We are doing the right thing for our country" and "I'm about to sign".

According to analyst Dimitris Pantoulas, "the opposition has given many different versions" regarding their interactions with Silvercorp. When first asked about his contacts with Silvercorp by the Associated Press, Rendón said that this information was confidential and that he could not confirm or deny signing a contract, even if it existed. Subsequently, Rendón stated that Guaidó had signed a "preliminary" agreement with Silvercorp. Rendón later insisted that the document Goudreau produced was never signed by Guaidó and provided previous and subsequent agreements to The Washington Post that did not bear Guaidó's signature.

Guaidó and his allies have denied that Guaidó signed the document, insisting that Rendón and Vergara signed on Guaidó's behalf; Rendón said that Guaidó "grew suspicious" of the "exploratory plan" having seen only an outline. They also said that Guaidó did not sign any contract with Silvercorp and never spoke with Jordan Goudreau directly or in a video or telephone call. In a statement on EVTV following the incident, Guaidó stated "That is not my signature. The dictatorship goes to great lengths to plant evidence." The opposition National Assembly described the document supposedly bearing Guaidó's signature as a "false document as justification to try and kidnap and illegally detain the interim president Juan Guaidó". In a May 2020 Meganálisis poll following the release of the documents, the pollster asked "Do you believe that Guaidó told the truth?" when he denied signing the agreement; 85.0% of respondents said "No", 4.3% said "Yes" and 10.6% said they did not know.

Although an agreement had been previously signed, the opposition attempted to distance themselves from their past interactions with Goudreau. The Associated Press wrote that Goudreau said that he advanced the operation "without Guaidó's support". The Washington Post wrote: "Goudreau counters that the agreement ... bound the opposition to his services and initial fee. A seven-page document provided by Goudreau carries Guaidó's signature" beside Rendón's and Vergara's.

== See also ==
- Operation Gideon (2020)

== Bibliography ==
- DeFronzo, James (2021). "Revolution through democracy". Revolutions and Revolutionary Movements (6th ed.). United Kingdom: Taylor & Francis. pp. 433–487. doi:10.4324/9781003102649-11. ISBN 9781000434576.
- Mijares, Victor M (2022). "Venezuela: A revolutionary petrostate under stress". In Wade, Christine J.; Kline, Harvey F. (eds.). Latin American Politics and Development (10th ed.). United Kingdom: Taylor & Francis. pp. 223–246. doi:10.4324/9781003223351-16. ISBN 9781000620559.
- Neuman, William (2022). Things Are Never So Bad That They Can't Get Worse: Inside the Collapse of Venezuela (1st ed.). St. Martin's Press. ISBN 978-1250266163.
