= Operation Gideon (2020) =

Conflict in Venezuela

- Part of the crisis in Venezuela and the Venezuelan presidential crisis
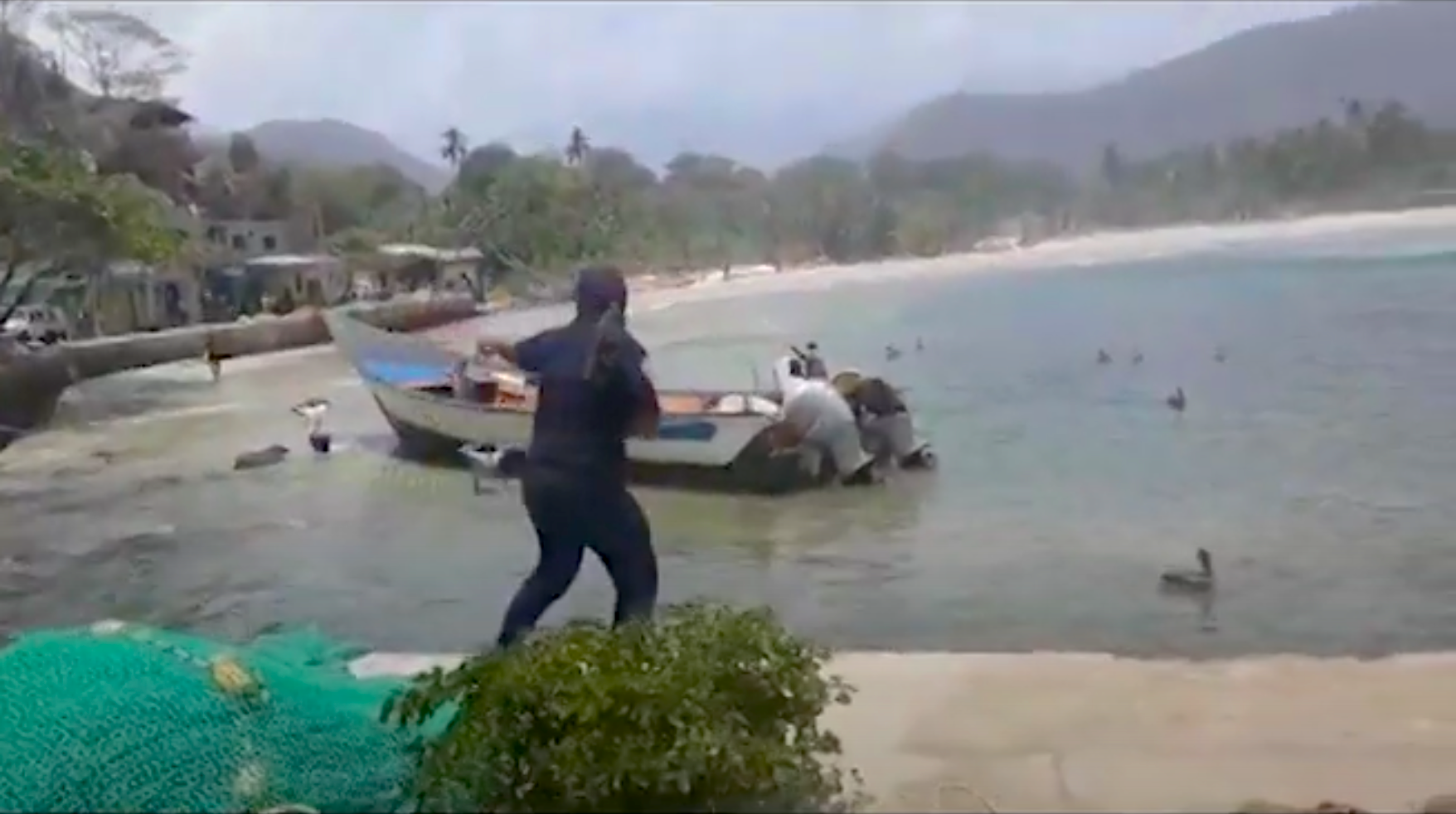
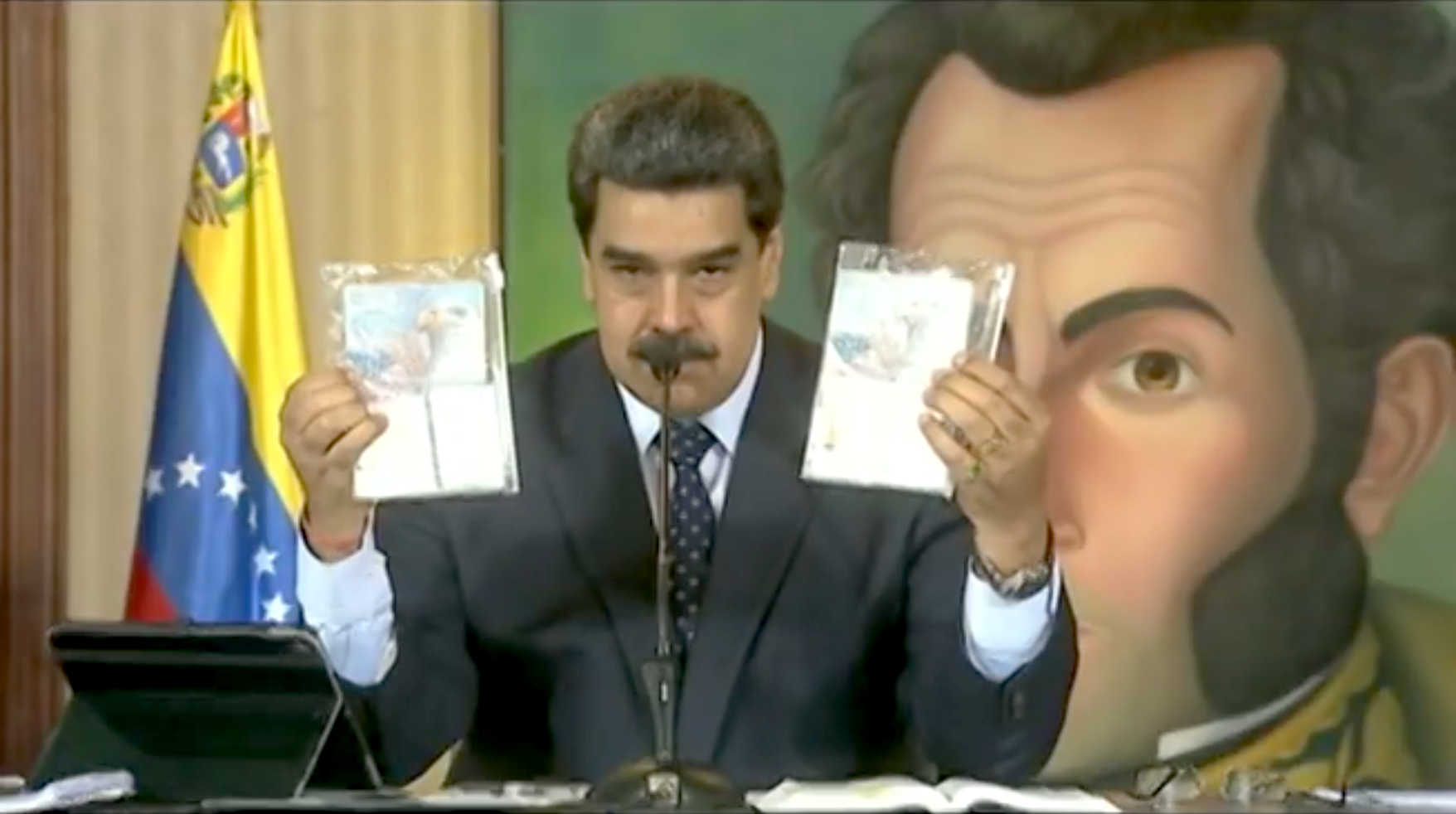
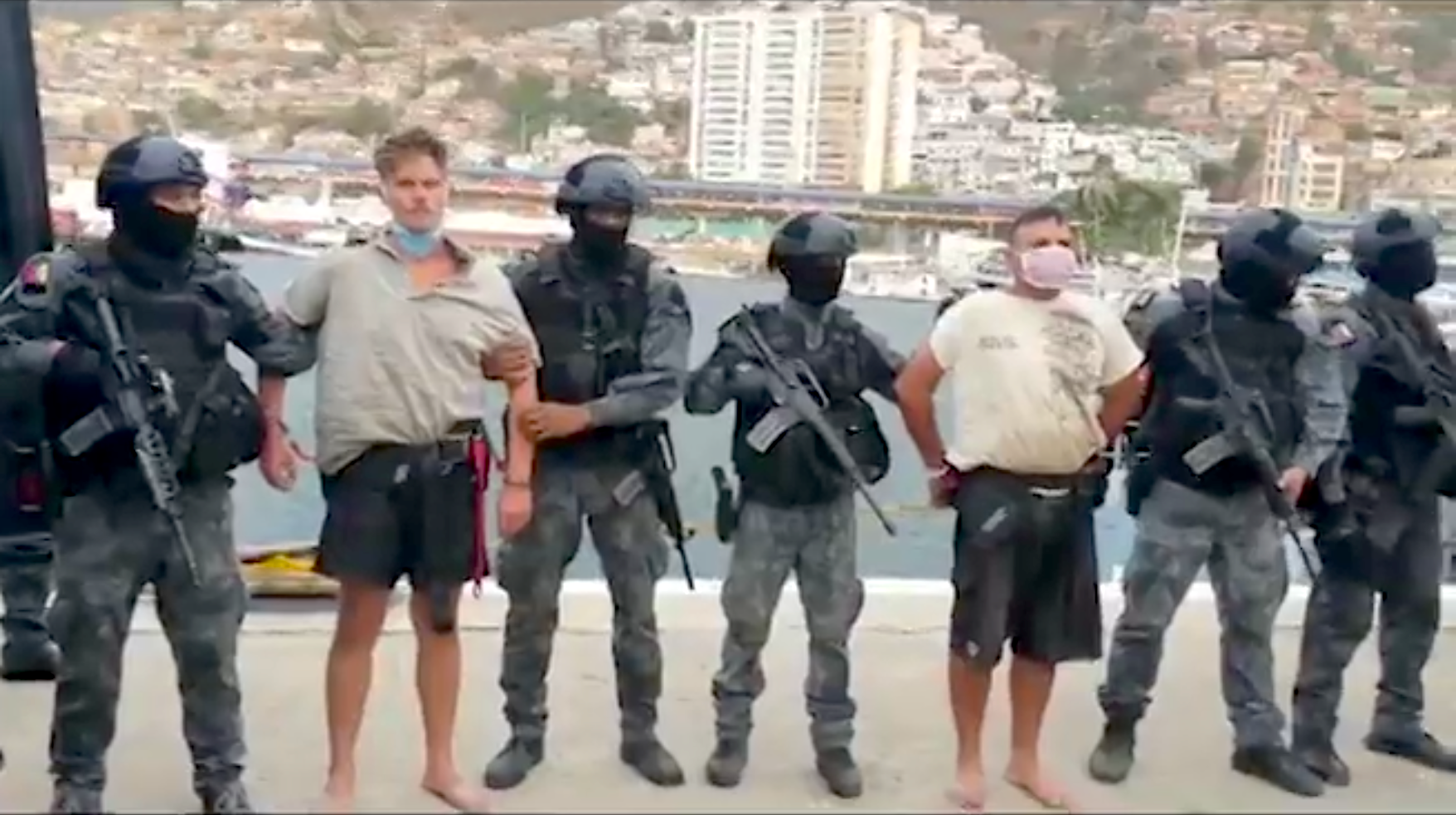
- Top to bottom, left to right: Venezuelan authorities intercepting a boat; Nicolás Maduro holding the US passports of captured former Green Berets; SEBIN agents displaying captured dissidents
Date	3–4 May 2020
Location	Venezuela: Macuto, Vargas; Chuao, Aragua
Result	Plot infiltrated and foiled by Maduro administration: Maduro administration begins Bolivarian Shield military response; Arrest warrants issued by the Maduro administration, including for Jordan Goudreau, J. J. Rendón and Sergio Vergara, on 8 May; Jordan Goudreau investigated by US federal authorities

Belligerents
Venezuela military and intelligence; National Bolivarian Armed Forces of Venezuela; Bolivarian Intelligence Service	Venezuelan dissidents; Active Coalition of the Venezuelan International Reserve (CARIVE); American contractors; Silvercorp USA

Commanders and leaders
Nicolás Maduro; Diosdado Cabello; Vladimir Padrino López; Néstor Reverol	Jordan Goudreau; Clíver Antonio Alcalá Cordones; Javier Enrique Nieto Quintero; Roberto Levid Colina Ibarra †; Antonio Sequea Torres (POW)

Strength
Unknown	300–800 (planned); ~60 (from sea)

Casualties and losses
None	6 killed; 91 captured (including 2 American mercenaries)

This article uses Spanish naming customs: the paternal surname is first, and the maternal surname is second.

Operation Gideon (Spanish: Operación Gedeón) was an unsuccessful attempt by the Active Coalition of the Venezuelan International Reserve, Venezuelan dissidents, and a private security firm, Jordan Goudreau's Silvercorp USA, to infiltrate Venezuela by sea and remove Nicolás Maduro from power. The plan executed from 3 to 4 May 2020 was for expatriate Venezuelan former military personnel living in Colombia to enter the country by boat at Macuto, take control of an airfield, capture Maduro and other high-level figures in his administration, and expel them from the country.

A landing attempt to initiate the operation went forward despite its impracticality. Two boats were launched from eastern Colombia toward the Caribbean coast of Venezuela north of Caracas, carrying approximately 60 Venezuelan dissidents and two American former Green Berets employed as mercenaries by Silvercorp. Both boats were intercepted before they reached land. At least six Venezuelan dissidents in the first boat were killed, and all but four of the invaders were captured during the attempted landing or subsequent search operations, including the two Americans from the second boat, whose interrogations were broadcast on state television.

Venezuelan intelligence agencies and the Associated Press (AP) had prior knowledge of the operation. Commentators and observers described the operation as amateurish, underfunded, poorly organized, impossible, and a suicide mission, and divergent narratives led to questions about how the plot unfolded. Sources criticized the poor planning and execution, alternating between characterizing the operation as an attempted invasion, infiltration, raid, ambush, assassination or coup. Maduro and his representatives described the attacking force as terrorists who planned to kill him in a plot coordinated by Colombia and the United States. Venezuelan opposition figure Juan Guaidó and some supporters described the event as a false flag orchestrated by Maduro, and Goudreau described the team as freedom fighters seeking to restore democracy.

== Background ==
Nicolás Maduro first took office as president of Venezuela in 2013 as the hand-picked successor of Hugo Chávez after Chávez's death from cancer. Javier Corrales wrote in a Journal of Democracy article that the "questionable electoral integrity" and the "slim margin" by which Maduro won the 2013 Venezuelan presidential election brought resistance to his mandate from "opposition parties, the media, civil society, elements of the military, and international actors". Corrales states that Maduro "presided over one of the most devastating national economic crises seen anywhere in modern times." Beginning with the 2014 Venezuelan protests, Popular Will leader Leopoldo López had sought to expel Maduro, calling for "direct action to remove" him, according to an article published by The Wall Street Journal.

According to Rafael Villa – writing in Defence Studies in 2022 – "Maduro's leadership [was] not consensual" and among the changes he had made to overcome his "political fragility" was promoting an excessive number of officers within the military, and the election of a 2017 Constituent National Assembly to replace the opposition-led National Assembly, which had been elected in 2015. Victor Mijares writes, in the book Latin American Politics and Development, that increased authoritarianism and control of the military in an environment of extreme poverty and inflation during a period marked by protests and repression, brought about a "legitimacy crisis coming from dubious elections" with the "combination of these tactics of political control and illegal rule" leading to the presidential crisis between Maduro and Popular Will politician Juan Guaidó. According to unnamed sources cited by The Wall Street Journal article, the 2018 election – "widely seen as fraudulent" – convinced López that negotiations with Maduro were not an option.

A power struggle for the presidency of Venezuela began in January 2019 following the 2018 presidential election; The Wall Street Journal stated that the 2018 election was "widely seen as fraudulent", and according to The Washington Post, incumbent Nicolás Maduro was "accused of stealing the 2018 elections" and leading a repressive administration. In January 2019, Guaidó was named president of the National Assembly – the "nation's last democratic institution" according to The Washington Post. He was later recognized by more than 50 countries, including the United States, as interim president of Venezuela. James DeFronzo wrote in the 2021 book, Revolutions and Revolutionary Movements, that: "Critics questioned whether there was really constitutional justification for Guaidó to become interim president in place of Maduro." The US administration of Donald Trump pressured for the exit of Maduro, charged him with narcoterrorism, and put a US$15 million reward for information leading to his capture and arrest. Throughout 2019, the Maduro administration maintained control of Venezuela's military agencies and key governmental institutions. Maduro enjoyed the support of the higher ranks of the military, but less so among the middle and lower ranks.

Establishing a government in Venezuela required three crucial elements: according to Villa, "the people, the international community, and the armed forces." Following the failed 2019 Venezuelan uprising attempt led by Guaidó against Maduro on 30 April, Guaidó's movement lost momentum. William Neuman wrote in the 2022 book Things Are Never So Bad That They Can't Get Worse: Inside the Collapse of Venezuela that, with waning support and other options not materializing, Guaidó and López sought "another way out of Venezuela's impasse". A Wall Street Journal article stated that unnamed sources said López and his closest aides began seeking a security firm and contemplated hiring mercenaries without the knowledge of other opposition parties. Guaidó and López have said that the meetings rarely went beyond informal conversations.

After the unsuccessful April 2019 uprising, some former military and police defectors who sided with Guaidó took refuge in Colombia; they considered their aim was to "liberate their homeland from the socialist government of [an] autocratic" president, according to The Washington Post. Businesses began to approach the Guaidó administration, seeking to profit from contracts they expected to become available as Guaidó replaced Maduro, and proposals of an armed operation to support Guaidó began to be discussed.

== Planning ==
Operation Gideon was primarily planned by Clíver Alcalá Cordones and Jordan Goudreau.

Alcalá was a Major General in the Venezuelan Army with close ties to the Hugo Chávez government until he defected under Maduro to Colombia in 2013 and began gathering other defectors, stationing them in the La Guajira Peninsula. In 2011, he was charged by the US with providing the Colombian FARC with arms, and was indicted for narcoterrorism in March 2020 as a member of the Cartel of the Suns.

Goudreau served in the Canadian Armed Forces and later moved to Washington, D.C. and enlisted in the United States Army, eventually reaching the rank of Sergeant First Class in the 10th Special Forces Group. He became a naturalized US citizen and retired at the age of 40 due to injuries. In 2018, he founded Silvercorp USA, with the initial idea being "to embed counter-terror agents in schools disguised as teachers".

Goudreau is reported to have provided security at a political rally for Donald Trump in Charlotte, North Carolina in October 2018 based on material on the Silvercorp website and Instagram account. In February 2019, Silvercorp provided security services at the Venezuela Aid Live concert in Colombia, and Goudreau turned his attention to Venezuela. According to Goudreau's friend and business partner, Drew White, he saw a business opportunity in the Trump administration's intensified efforts to remove Maduro from power. White said he distanced himself from Silvercorp and Goudreau when Goudreau began discussing launching a military operation in Venezuela.

Journalist Sebastiana Barráez, who specializes in Venezuelan military reporting, writes that what came to be known as Operation Gideon was three different plans at different times: one was the preparation in the Colombian camps of exiled Venezuelan military led by Alcalá until he was extradited to the U.S. in March 2020; another was the period after that when Antonio Sequea took over the camps until he led the men on what she calls a "suicide mission" to an ambush at Macuto; and yet another phase was what related to SilverCorp and Diosdado Cabello, who had infiltrated the camps and had advance knowledge of the plans. (Note: Colombian intelligence sources who later arrested other suspects also stated that Maduro double-agents had infiltrated the camps.) The raid has also been called the “Stupid Bay of Pigs,” a reference to the failed CIA-backed invasion of Cuba in 1961.

=== Initial promotion: March–May 2019 ===
Alcalá openly discussed his plans to overthrow the Maduro government with a 1,000 men strong force with The Wall Street Journal, saying "If you don't do this now, the republic is lost." The Wall Street Journal reported that Alcalá planned to use dissident soldiers from the Venezuelan army and national guard, hoping to involve officers in the operation prior to their purging by the Maduro government.

Through connections within the private security community, Goudreau was acquainted with Keith Schiller, the longtime director of security for Donald Trump. Schiller brought Goudreau to a March 2019 fundraising event focused on security in Venezuela and future investments in the nation following a potential end of the Maduro government, which took place at the University Club of Washington, DC. Lester Toledo, the director of humanitarian aid for Guaidó's government, also attended.

Weeks later, according to an AP article, Toledo introduced Goudreau to Alcalá at JW Marriott Bogotá during a conference where groups of Venezuelan exiles, some of whom were involved in Guaidó's failed uprising, gathered. The Wall Street Journal reported that Alcalá and Goudreau had been introduced by "associates" of Leopoldo López and that opposition officials were convinced about the plot's feasibility. During the two-day meeting with Toledo and Goudreau, Alcalá disclosed that he had recruited some 300 men stationed at training camps on the Guajira Peninsula near Riohacha, Colombia, ready to carry out "a 'mad plan' to push across the western border, take the oil center of Maracaibo and force their way to Caracas, the capital". Goudreau indicated that instead of 300 as Alcalá promised, there were only 60 trainees. Goudreau proposed an alternative approach, suggesting that his company, Silvercorp, could train and equip the soldiers for a rapid strike at a cost of US$1.5 million. Goudreau said he had contacts with Trump administration officials, though reportedly did not provide support for his statements. Men familiar with the missions said Goudreau "had convinced the men that they were training for a U.S.-backed incursion into Venezuela", according to The Washington Post. Following the meeting at JW Marriott, Toledo and some Guaidó officials indicated that they ended contact with Goudreau because they believed the operation was a suicide mission and they did not trust Alcalá.

In May 2019, Schiller and Goudreau met with Guaidó administration officials in Miami, Florida, where Goudreau promoted the idea of providing security for Guaidó officials. Schiller distanced himself from Goudreau following the meeting, believing that Goudreau was incapable of providing the services he was offering.

Goudreau's October 2020 lawsuit stated that a $500-million proposal had been submitted by Blackwater founder Erik Prince that involved 5,000 troops and mercenaries. Guaidó and his representatives, as well as Prince and his representatives, denied such reports.

=== Colombia Silvercorp established: June 2019 ===
A Colombian branch of Silvercorp was opened in mid-2019 by Goudreau and Yacsy Alezandra Álvarez Mirabal, who acted as a translator for Alcalá and Goudreau. Álvarez was an assistant of Franklin Durán, a Venezuelan businessman who had business ties with the Venezuelan government for about two decades until his company was expropriated by the government; one of his businesses had a history of importing military equipment. Durán and his brothers were friends with Alcalá prior to the event; the AP described Durán as "close to the government of the late Hugo Chávez".

In June 2019, Alcalá met with the National Intelligence Directorate of Colombia asking for support, saying Goudreau was a former CIA agent. CIA contacts in Bogotá reportedly denied that Goudreau had ever been a CIA agent. According to Álvarez, former president of Colombia Álvaro Uribe and then president Iván Duque expressed support for Goudreau's efforts, offering them a training camp, an airstrip and safe passage for individuals in exchange for combatting militants of the National Liberation Army in the area. US officials learned of the "hundreds of Venezuelan soldiers who had defected and were living precariously in Colombia" and discussed a plan to reorganize them to assist victims of the Venezuelan refugee crisis, thus diverting them from illegal activities. When reports emerged that they might be used for an armed operation, one anonymous US official described the notion as "completely insane".

By 16 June 2019, Goudreau had compiled a list of required equipment, according to former United States Navy SEAL Ephraim Mattos, who met with Alcalá's troops while working in Colombia. The list included "320 M4 assault rifles, an anti-tank rocket launcher, Zodiac boats, US$1 million in cash and state-of-the-art night vision goggles". According to Mattos, the trainees believed they had the backing of the U.S. government; after reviewing Silvercorp on the internet, he said: "I was like, 'Guys, guys, guys, this guy is not who he says he is.'"

=== Negotiations with Guaidó representatives: August–November 2019 ===
The General Services Agreement Attachments signed between Guaidó government officials and Silvercorp USA in October 2019. Vergara and Rendón, who have since resigned their positions on the Strategy Committee, acknowledge they signed the agreement and the attachments, but say it was quickly cancelled.

Guaidó established a Strategic Committee in August 2019 and named J. J. Rendón to head it. The committee was tasked with exploring possibilities and testing scenarios for the removal of Maduro from power, with methods ranging from increased international condemnation of Maduro to armed action. After reviewing all legal means of removing Maduro, the group adopted the position that the Venezuelan Constitution, the United Nations Convention against Transnational Organized Crime, and other treaties provided justification for pursuing a change of government. Among other options, Rendón considered an insurrection against the Maduro government. Foreign contractors would advise and support Venezuelans in a military operation to capture Maduro and replace his government with Guaido's.

Sources told The Wall Street Journal that López and others had reviewed six or more bids from private military companies to enter Venezuela, encourage a rebellion in the armed forces and overthrow Maduro. By 7 September 2019, Goudreau made a sales pitch to Rendón proposing the capture of Maduro and his officials and their extraction from Venezuela with a self-financed plan at a cost of $212.9 million, backed by future oil sales.

A General Services Agreement between Venezuela and Silvercorp was signed on 16 October 2019, by Goudreau on behalf of Silvercorp and Rendón and Sergio Vergara, on behalf of the Guaidó administration. Within a week of signing the agreement, Goudreau reportedly claimed to have secured funding for the operation, but provided no proof. Rendón told reporters that shortly after signing the agreement, Goudreau began acting suspicious and demanding immediate payment of the $1.5 million retainer that was due within a five-day period according to the agreement. Rendón transferred Goudreau $50,000 from his personal account for "expenses" (confirmed publicly by Goudreau) to buy more time, but the relationship between the two quickly deteriorated.

On 8 November 2019, Goudreau met Rendón and the two had a heated argument. According to Rendón, he and other Guaidó administration officials "considered the operation dead" after this encounter. Rendón attempted to provide a letter canceling the agreement, though Gourdeau refused. It was reported that Juan Guaidó himself signed a preliminary contract. Guaidó and his allies denied that he signed the contract directly. Goudreau provided a covert recording of "what appears to be", according to the Miami Herald, a video call with Guaidó on 16 October 2019 in which Guaidó purportedly says that he was going to sign the document. Guaidó and his allies state that Rendón and Vergara signed on Guaidó's behalf; Rendón said that Guaidó "grew suspicious" of the "exploratory plan" having seen only an outline.

Although an agreement had been previously signed, the opposition attempted to distance themselves from their past interactions with Goudreau. The AP wrote that Goudreau said that he advanced the operation "without Guaidó's support". The Washington Post wrote: "Goudreau counters that the agreement ... bound the opposition to his services and initial fee. A seven-page document provided by Goudreau carries Guaidó's signature" with Rendón's and Vergara's.

=== Alcalá and Goudreau resume preparations: December 2019 ===
External videos
- Troops practicing clearing drills with model firearms on YouTube from Vice magazine
- Another clearing drill on YouTube from Vice magazine

Goudreau and Alcalá reportedly distanced themselves from the Venezuelan opposition due to their perception that the opposition was insincere and hypocritical because of alleged secret negotiations with the Maduro government. Though they no longer had the support of the opposition government, they resumed their preparations. Without aid from the US government or the Guaidó administration, Goudreau and Alcalá did not have the means required for a successful operation.

Former Venezuelan National Guard captain Javier Enrique Nieto Quintero, a leader of an international network of Venezuelan dissidents known as the Active Coalition of the Venezuelan International Reserve (CARIVE, Spanish: Coalición Activa de la Reserva Internacional Venezolana), was approached to help provide operators. According to Nieto, CARIVE asked him to meet with Alcalá and that the tactical equipment presented by the former general, including rifles and night vision goggles, with Nieto stating the materials "showed the political leaders in Venezuela and the international community that the commitment was already there".

By December 2019, Silvercorp had purchased a 41-foot (12 m) fiberglass boat in Florida that was equipped with navigational equipment two months later. Silvercorp received funding from an anonymous source on 13 January 2020, according to lien records. With Goudreau and translator Álvarez, two other former Green Beret operators, Airan Berry and Luke Denman, traveled to Colombia on a 16 January private flight from Opa-Locka, Florida to Barranquilla, Colombia provided by Durán. Berry was a special forces engineer sergeant in the Army from 1996 to 2013, while Denman left the Army in 2011. More than sixty Venezuelan dissidents gathered in Riohacha, Colombia, to train.

In March 2020, Goudreau traveled to Jamaica in the Silvercorp-owned fiberglass boat named Silverpoint where he met with former special forces friends and discussed Operation Gideon. According to Jack Murphy, self-identified as a former US Ranger, the CIA learned about the plan and warned Silvercorp not to go through with it on numerous occasions. Goudreau then contacted Guaidó's officials one last time asking for funding. The Wall Street Journal reported that the planned operation was "widely known to former Venezuelan soldiers who considered participating, Venezuelan opposition figures, senior Colombian intelligence officials and even the CIA, which monitored their activities in La Guajira". On 28 March, the boat was damaged, triggering an emergency position-indicating radio beacon that alerted authorities in Curaçao, who rescued Goudreau. They returned him to Florida and COVID travel restrictions prevented him from rejoining his men.

Hernán Alemán, an opposition politician who initially supported the plan, while describing Goudreau as a friend, indicated in an interview following the event that he did not know any details surrounding the contract or discussions that took place in the United States. He stated that Rendón never financed the operation and that he and Alcalá undertook the operation with Goudreau without his party's knowledge, deciding to finance the operation themselves. Alemán said that at its peak, the group consisted of four camps occupied by 150 military. He added that the operation was compromised and had been infiltrated, saying that after Alcalá's arrest, the operation's control was transferred to other people, there was no contact with the new leaders, and other insurgents said Sequea Torres was a mole – an allegation repeated by others but denied by Jorge Arreaza, Maduro's foreign minister.

The Venezuelan government later published an audio recording of Alemán by Venezuelan intelligence, in which he reportedly tells a listener that he had met a CIA officer at the U.S. ambassador's house; Vice magazine printed a portion of Alemán's alleged conversation (noting the recording "could very well have been tampered with by a security service loyal to Maduro") which has Alemán saying, "Here in a meeting with all the bigwigs in the house of the [U.S. ambassador] ... I was even speaking with the guy from the CIA. They put me there so that the CIA guy would talk to me". Alemán later acknowledged in an interview with Infobae that the voice on the recording was his, at a social gathering celebrating the 4 and 5 July, saying that the distortion to make it appear they had conspired with the US was untrue. He stated that, "If there was one thing we were always very clear about, it was that the United States was not going to get involved in an action like the one [we] planned."

=== Extradition of Alcalá to the United States: March 2020 ===
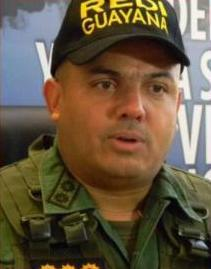
Clíver Alcalá Cordones, one of the alleged leaders of the operation, indicted by the United States

A shipment of weapons and tactical gear was confiscated on 23 March 2020 by Colombian authorities tipped off by the Drug Enforcement Administration (DEA), with former DEA officials initially believing that the equipment was being sent to leftist guerrillas or criminal gangs. The impounded truck was headed for Venezuela carrying 26 semi-automatic rifles, night vision goggles, radios, and 15 combat helmets produced by High-End Defense Solutions, a company owned by Venezuelan Americans.

On 26 March 2020, the United States accused Maduro of narcoterrorism, and through its Narcotics Rewards Program offered a US$15 million reward for information leading to his arrest, plus an additional US$10 million each for information leading to the arrest of four close Maduro allies: Diosdado Cabello, Maikel Moreno, Tareck El Aissami, Vladimir Padrino López and Cilver Alcalá, one of the alleged leaders of the operation. The same day, Alcalá placed a video on Twitter where he assumed responsibility for "a military operation against the Maduro dictatorship" that included the shipment of weapons captured in Colombia, stating that the United States, Colombia, and Guaidó officials had signed an agreement to overthrow Maduro. After Alcalá assumed responsibility for the weapons shipment, the Colombian attorney general announced on 28 March that an investigation into Alcalá's role in the shipment had been opened.

Guaidó denied knowledge of the event while United States Special Representative to Venezuela Elliott Abrams described Alcalá's statement as "despicable and quite dangerous". Abrams later said that Alcalá "was put up to making those terrible charges by the [Maduro] regime". Alcalá was extradited to the United States on drug trafficking charges after voluntarily surrendering on about 27 March.

The Venezuelan government said that Alcalá was a US agent and that, after the operation failed, the United States government used narcoterrorism charges as a way to transport him to the United States to prevent him from revealing more secrets. In the context of reacting to the intercepted shipment on 26 March, Maduro stated that Alcalá was hired by the DEA to assassinate him, "but he failed because we made him fail".

According to Alemán, who acknowledges participating in the planning of the operation up until the point Alcalá was extradited to the United States, Sequea took control of the operation and replaced military personnel. Alemán remarked that Goudreau was unable to exercise command because he was in the United States. Alemán, saying he was basing his statements on others, accused Sequea of being a mole and of selling the group out.

In November 2021, Alcalá's lawyers lodged a motion to have the US charges dismissed along with a statement that US officials at the highest levels of the CIA, Department of the Treasury, Department of Justice, the National Security Council and the DEA were aware of his efforts to overthrow Maduro. The attorney also stated Rendón and two Guaidó allies were aware of Alcalá's coup plan. In June 2023, Alcalá pled guilty in the U.S. to "two counts of providing material support to a terrorist group and illicit transfer of firearms", with the narcotics charges dropped.

==== Prior knowledge of operation ====
According to the Associated Press, the operation "was infiltrated by Maduro's vast, Cuban-trained intelligence network" early on. The Associated Press asserted that it had investigated and published about the operation before it happened. The Venezuelan government knew the location of the camps on Guajira Peninsula by September 2019, with Vice President of Venezuela Delcy Rodríguez announcing the coordinates of the militants while speaking at the general debate of the United Nations General Assembly. The Washington Post wrote that Maduro "was well-informed of the effort virtually from its start".

Two days after the confiscation of weapons and munitions in Colombia, on 25 March, the Venezuelan Minister of Communication and Information, Jorge Rodríguez, gave a televised press conference in which he published details related to the training camps. Rodríguez named former Venezuelan army captain Roberto Levid "Pantera" Colina Ibarra, whom he identified as a murderer, as the leader of one of the training sites with the support of Colombian President Iván Duque. Rodríguez mentioned that there were three American instructors at the training camps. "We know their cover names: agent Jordan, agent Luke, and agent Aaron," he announced.

On 28 March, Diosdado Cabello identified Goudreau as an adviser for Alcalá during episode 294 of the television show Con El Mazo Dando. Cabello also identified by first name the two Americans; he referred to Denman and Berry only as "Luke" and "Aaron" [phonetic spelling]. Cabello also exhibited photographs purportedly showing Goudreau, Silvercorp and content from their social media profiles, and photographs from Instagram depicting Goudreau providing security services during the Venezuela Aid Live concert in Cúcuta and at a Trump rally in Charlotte. The purpose of broadcasting the images was to show that the United States was allegedly behind the international effort to remove Maduro from power and was conspiring with narcotics traffickers, referring to Alcalá. The program also exhibited excerpts from various media organizations discussing the alleged contract between Guaidó and Silvercorp.

Around the middle of 2019, Maduro stated there was a "plan ... to get 32 mercenaries into Venezuela to kill me and to kill Venezuelan revolutionary leaders". After news of the event broke, Maduro was explicit about the level of insider knowledge his government had, saying in his first public appearance: "We knew everything: what they were talking about, what they ate, what they drank, what they didn't drink, who financed them." According to The Washington Post, a "senior opposition official called the Alcalá-Goudreau plan 'the worst-kept secret in Venezuela'.

According to McClatchy and Goudreau, officials within the Trump administration had advance knowledge of the plan while The Wall Street Journal said that the CIA monitored and knew about the plot. The United States denied involvement and when asked about its knowledge by The Wall Street Journal, the CIA deferred comments to the White House, which said it did not have direct roles in the operation. The Colombian government said it first had knowledge of the plot after its authorities captured weapons destined for the operation and following the detention of Alcalá, though the Venezuelan opposition said that Colombian intelligence and high-level officials knew of the plot for months. In an audio recording, members of the Venezuelan opposition are heard discussing that President of Colombia Álvaro Uribe opposed any cooperation with Alcalá.

=== Final preparations, Associated Press article: April–May 2020 ===
By the time of the landing attempt, many of the dissidents had abandoned their camps following the arrest of Alcalá, investigations by Colombian authorities, and the growing pandemic; because Goudreau's promises had failed to materialize; and due to rumors that Maduro had infiltrated the operation. The Guardian suggested that Goudreau went ahead with the operation despite its poor planning because he was seeking the US$15 million reward that the US government placed on Maduro.

In November 2020, the Miami Herald published an article based on an interview with an anonymous source known by the nickname Cacique, "a Venezuelan rebel officer who operated the communications center for the failed incursion from an undisclosed city in the United States" and was a CARIVE member and Nieto confidant. He stated that the Maduro government had offered a reward for Colina, and two to three days before the operation, a member of the group, who directed a faction of five moles, "sold the exact landing coordinates shortly before departure", seeking to collect on the reward. According to the report, Maduro intelligence knew the exact coordinates where the invaders would attempt their landing, and were expecting their arrival.

As the planned operation approached, a new commander moved the group into the arid area on the Guajira Peninsula of northern Colombia, with one of the dissidents saying that the group spent their time hiding and held conviction for their cause of overthrowing Maduro.

The AP published a 1 May 2020 article written by Joshua Goodman about Goudreau, the plan and its history, and the training camps, writing that the scheme was "far-fetched" and that people who knew him believed he was "in way over his head". The article suggested that the Maduro government may have known of the plan since late-March 2020, but certainly knew by 1 May. Maduro confirmed that he knew of the plan by the evening of 1 May, and said that it had been initially planned for 10 March, but postponed due to the COVID-19 pandemic.

Objectives included securing the General Directorate of Military Counterintelligence headquarters, neutralizing the Presidential Honor Guard at Miraflores Palace and securing an airfield, where they would extract Maduro, who was code named "Jackpot". Silvercorp would then stay to maintain humanitarian aid distribution while Goudreau would arrive in Caracas following the operation's success. When asked why his troops would land at one of Venezuela's most fortified coastlines, twenty miles from Caracas and next to the country's biggest airport, he cited as inspiration the Battle of Gaugamela, won by Alexander the Great, who had "struck deep into the heart of the enemy". During the event, Goudreau gave an interview by telephone from Florida to an AP reporter. Goudreau said that his intention in launching the raid was to "introduce a catalyst", acknowledging that it is impractical to believe "60 guys can come in and topple a regime". Despite the long odds, he expressed his belief that "60 guys can go in and inspire the military and police to flip and join in the liberation of their country".

== Landing attempt ==
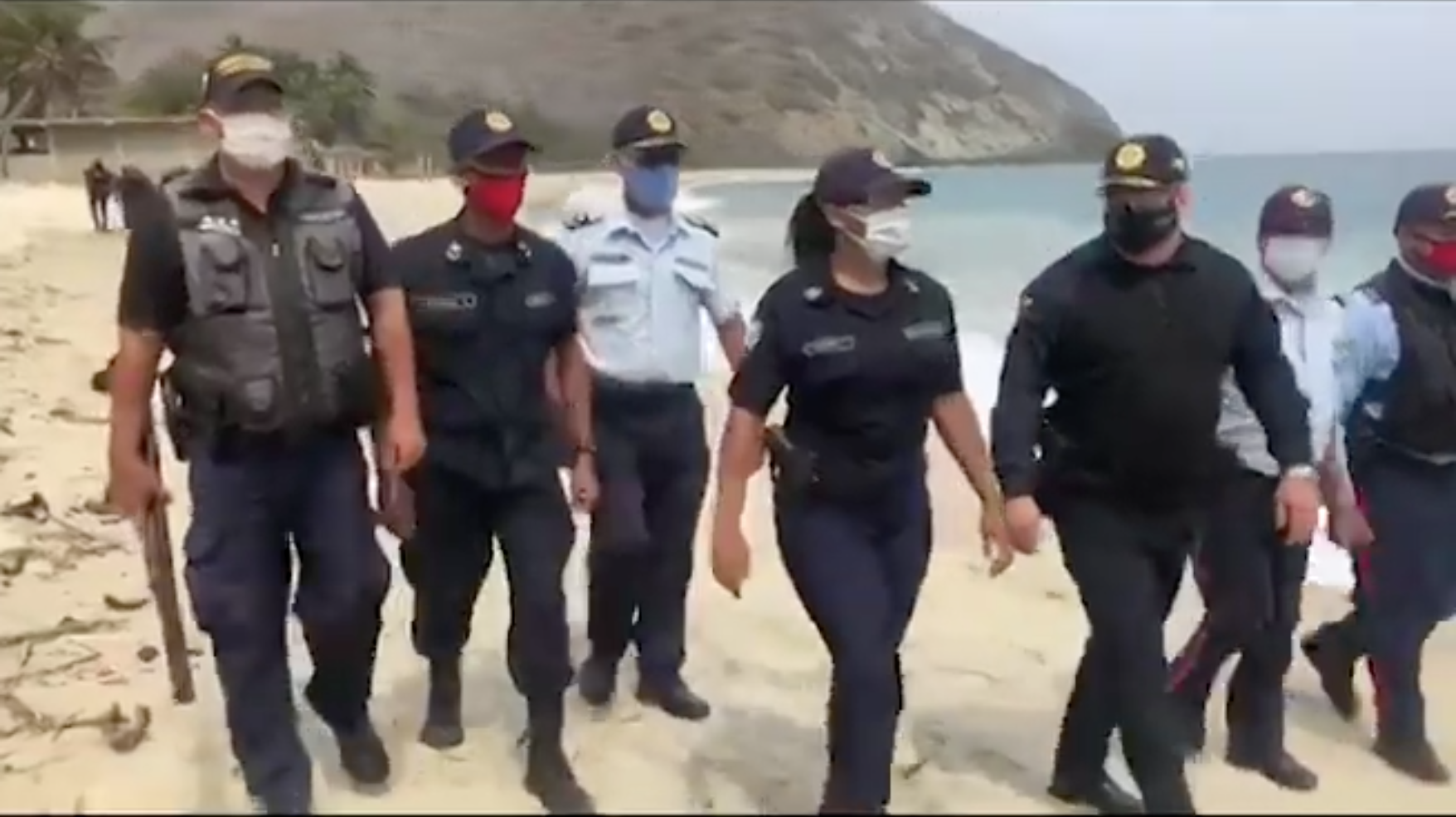
Venezuelan authorities monitoring the Caribbean coast during the Bolivarian Shield exercises

The boats launched from a beach in the Guajira Peninsula of northern Colombia, on 2 May 2020 in two waves, beginning with a pilot boat carrying 10–11 men, and followed by a larger boat carrying 46–47, including two former United States Army Special Forces members employed as private military contractors for Silvercorp. The force traveled about 400 miles (640 km) through the ocean, passing Aruba and Curaçao, planning to meet with other insurgents stationed inland that possessed weapons caches and fighting vehicles. The two boats eventually lost contact with one another.

The Maduro administration first acknowledged a "maritime invasion" at 07:30 a.m. on Sunday, 3 May 2020, in an announcement from Interior Minister Néstor Reverol. According to their version, a firefight ensued when the occupants of the first boat, led by Colina, shot at the Venezuelan authorities who were waiting for them to reach the shore at Macuto, La Guaira. Opposition lawmaker Wilmer Azuaje and journalist Sebastiana Barráez said that Venezuelan authorities had advance knowledge of the landing and that they staged the firefight, at odds with the government's account that the confrontation began after Colina started shooting.

The first boat was sunk by Venezuelan security forces in the pre-dawn hours of Sunday, 3 May 2020, near Macuto, La Guaira. After initially reporting that eight individuals were killed and two captured, Venezuelan spokespersons revised the number of deceased to six. One of the men killed was the first boat's leader Colina, who was alleged to have directed a training camp in Riohacha.

In the afternoon of 3 May – after the first boat's arrival at Macuto and before the second boat was intercepted – Goudreau released a video to Twitter, appearing next to the CARIVE leader Nieto, in which he dubbed the plot Operation Gideon, and announced that "[a]t 1700 hours, a daring amphibious raid was launched from the border of Colombia deep into the heart of Caracas". Goudreau said that the operation was ongoing and that "units have been activated in the south, east and west of Venezuela". Goudreau later acknowledged misleading the media with false information to allow time for the men to escape. In the video, Nieto said that the objective of the operation was to detain the leadership of the Maduro government and free political prisoners.

The occupants of the second boat were reportedly destined for an area near Caracas where they would set up a camp under the supervision of Berry and Denman in preparation for an invasion force they hoped would attract disaffected Venezuelan soldiers looking to join the efforts to remove Maduro from power. According to a source close to the mission, the plan was for the men to spend a few days in safe houses before moving covertly to Caracas. A survivor of the second boat who managed to evade capture told VICE News that his group had received word from the operation's leadership that the mission was a failure and that they should attempt to escape into the mountains. An individual on the second boat later reported that the craft had experienced engine problems and had difficulty navigating due to excessive weight, with the boat's canopy, the uniforms of soldiers and even other gear being thrown overboard in an attempt to make it to shore. Goudreau told the Washington Post that he last spoke to the crew on 4 May around noon and that he engaged in efforts to "secure a vessel out of Aruba to 'extract' them". Most of the men on the second boat were dropped off along the shoreline to attempt escape from Venezuelan authorities, but Sequea, Denman, and Berry remained on board, possibly with the intention of seeking refuge in international waters.

Those remaining in the second boat were intercepted off the coast of Chuao by helicopters and Coast Guard boats, and did not put up any resistance. Eight men, including Sequea, Berry, Denman, and Josnars Adolfo Baduel, son of former Chávez Defense Minister Raúl Baduel, were captured from the second boat. Two other individuals were detained in Puerto Cruz later that day.

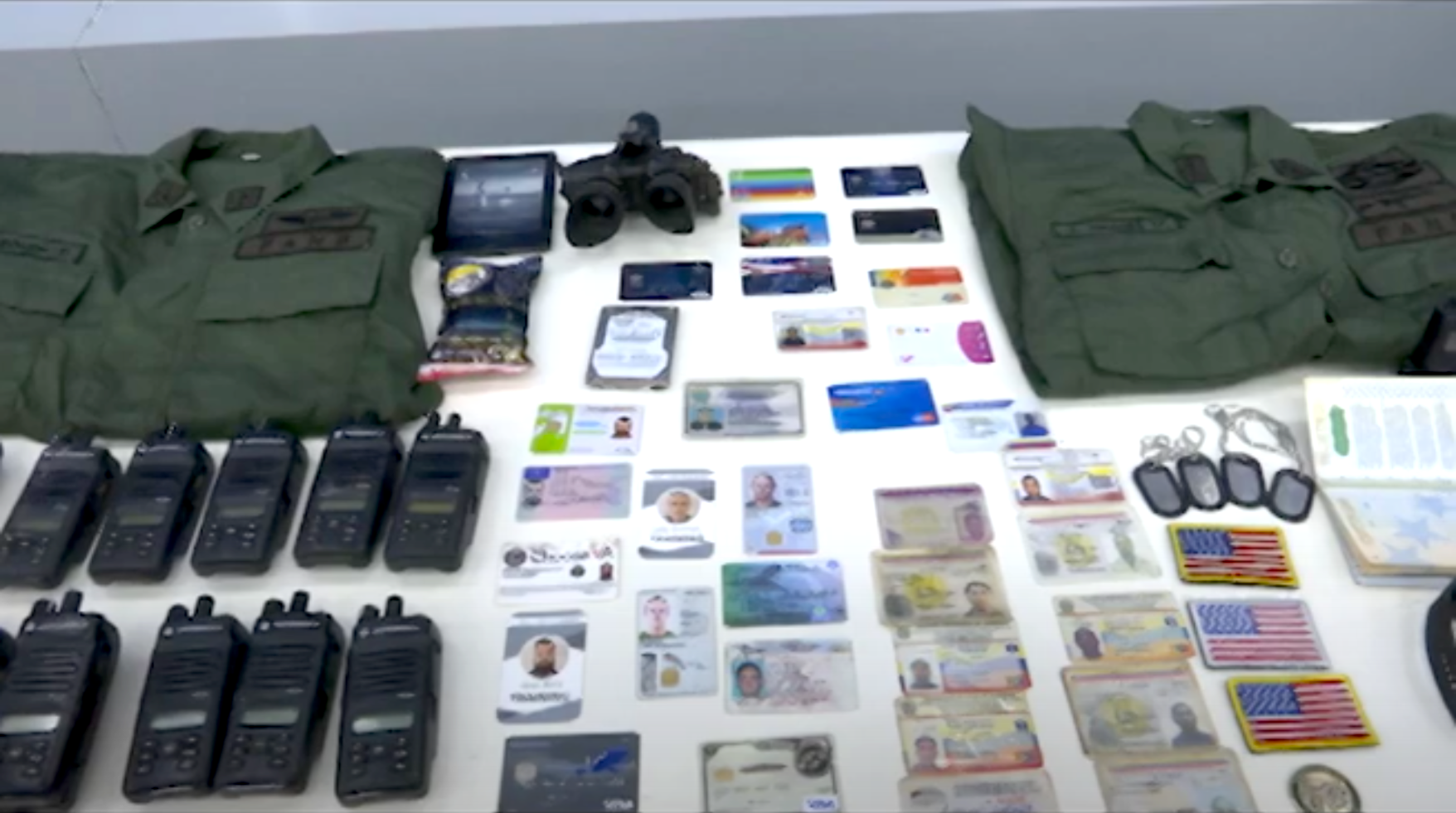
Equipment and identity documents allegedly brought into Venezuela during the incursion

The Venezuelan military reported that the "mercenaries" had "war materials" on their boats. The Maduro government reported that the items seized included vehicles for mounting machine guns, weapons, and uniforms embroidered with an American flag. Speaking on national television that day, Reverol said that the Venezuelan military's defensive operation was ongoing, and would be for several days. By 15 May, the Maduro government reported that it had arrested 39 other defectors who had attempted to flee Venezuela, reporting a total of 91 arrested in the plot. All but four of those who left the Guajira Peninsula were killed, arrested during the attempted landing, or captured in subsequent search operations.

== Aftermath ==
Different versions of the narrative led to questions about the operation. (Note: Neuman wrote, "But there were too many questions without answers ... was the point to create a paper trail? Did someone want something to hold over Guaidó's head? Or was someone looking to undermine Guaidó and make him look foolish and reckless? Or was it simply what it appeared to be – an incredibly naive and badly executed effort to hire a mercenary force to solve the problem that the opposition hadn't been able to solve on its own?" * The BBC questioned: "Did they know Nicolas Maduro's government had intelligence about the conspiracy? Venezuelans are some of the most connected people on Earth, but apparently only those in charge had access to cell phones. One source says the commander, Antonio Sequea, was aware of Cabello's TV expose and other comments made by Nicolas Maduro's ministers about the conspiracy, but he assured supporters in the US he had everything under control. Did Jordan Goudreau know the operation was compromised?" * A July 2020 article in The Washington Post states: "There's no question Maduro had moles inside the murky conspiracy ... Yet Maduro's government also alleges that Operation Gideon amounted to a genuine attempt to kill him." The Post article also stated that "a senior U.S. official who spoke on the condition of anonymity" said: 'The situation of Franklin Durán is puzzling' and 'creates a series of questions about what the regime knew and when they knew it'." * The Wall Street Journal wrote that: "The ease with which Venezuela put down the uprising has stoked speculation that the mission was a false-flag operation organized by Caracas ... " * The Associated Press mentions that court filings by Alcalá "raise fresh questions about what the Trump administration knew ... ")

Maduro's Attorney General Tarek William Saab announced that 25,000 national troops were mobilized in a Venezuelan military mission named "Bolivarian Shield" (Spanish: Escudo Bolivariano) to protect the country from similar attempts. Saab requested that the Supreme Tribunal of Justice declare Guaidó's political party, Popular Will, a terrorist group due to the attempted sea incursion. Guaidó responded to the charges, stating that Maduro defended "irregular groups" like the National Liberation Army and the Revolutionary Armed Forces of Colombia."

The Venezuelan Operational Zone of Integral Defense (Zodi) of La Guaira announced that Russian Special Operations Forces were assisting Venezuelan soldiers with surveillance from unmanned aerial vehicles, but it was determined that the equipment could not be operated in the region. The announcement was later deleted.

Nieto, one of the organizers of the operation, said on 7 May that the events were only an "advanced tactical reconnaissance" and that CARIVE had 3,000 troops.

=== Indictments and arrests ===
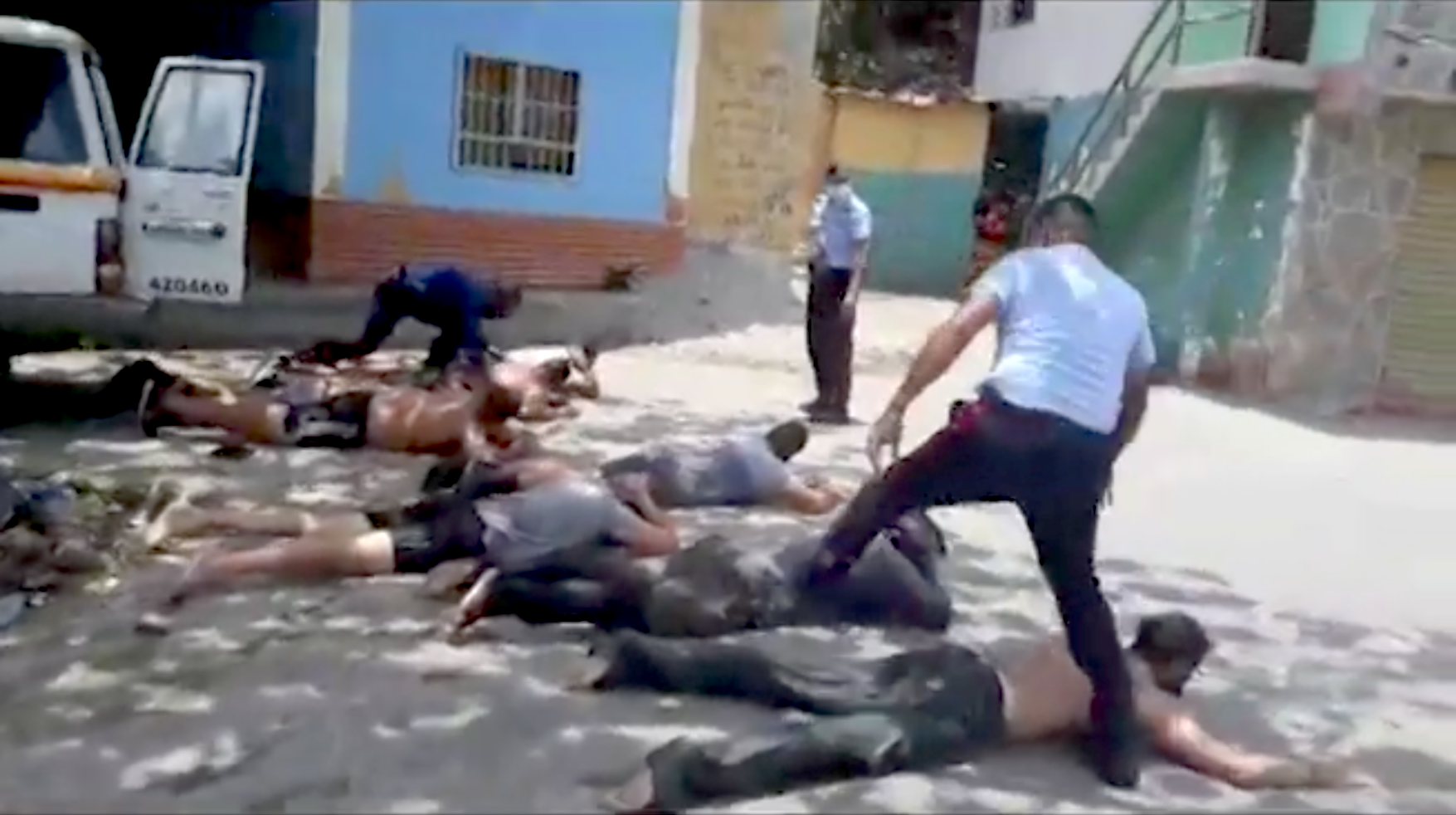
Detainees in prone position in custody of Venezuelan authorities

As of 21 May 2020, 66 arrests took place and 99 arrests warrants had been issued, 63 of which remained outstanding.

Following 4 May, more individuals were arrested further inland with caches of weapons, ammunition, communication devices and technical pickup trucks with mounted machine guns. On 4 May, Maduro said Venezuelan forces had detained 13 "mercenaries", including two Americans working with Goudreau: Berry and Denman. Goudreau said that eight of his soldiers had been captured on 4 May, the two Americans and six Venezuelans, and that an unknown number had been captured on 3 May.

Maduro stated that "dozens" of "mercenaries" had been captured on 5 May. Another three individuals were arrested on 6 May. Adolfo Baduel, son of former Chávez Defense Minister, Raúl Baduel, was among the detainees and said that the two arrested Americans were linked to the Trump administration. By 6 May, the Defense Minister announced an additional three arrests via his Twitter account, publishing a photo of the purported detainees with pixelated faces on their knees with their wrists zip-tied together without disclosing the names or any other additional details regarding the accused.

Nicolás Maduro held a virtual press conference that day broadcast on state television in which he presented portions of Denman's interrogation, described by Neuman as a "propaganda-style interrogation". In the video, Denman states that his instructions were to seize an airport and fly Maduro to the United States, which Maduro cited as proof that the orders came directly from United States President Donald Trump. The video shows Denman answering questions that were asked in English, also indicating that he was hired through Goudreau and that they trained 50 combatants in Colombia in January 2020. Neumann wrote that, when asked "Who commands [Goudreau]?", Denman rolled his eyes when answering – a gesture that "seemed intended to contradict his words" when he replied it was Trump. Mattos, the Navy SEAL who had visited the rebel training camps in Colombia but was not involved in the operation, made the same observation, noting that it may have been a covert signal, and that "special operation soldiers are trained to find creative ways to discredit any propaganda videos they are forced to make if captured by the enemy" and that the odd eye movement was "a clear sign from Luke that he is being forced". Berry was also subject to interrogation which was videotaped and presented in parts on state television on 7 May, during a press release presented by the Jorge Rodríguez.

An additional interrogation video depicting Denman in an orange jumpsuit was aired on state television on 18 May 2020. In the video, Denman indicates that his objective in embarking on the operation, as relayed by Goudreau, was to arrive in Colombia to train Venezuelans, accompany them to Venezuela for the landing, and once the Venezuelan dissidents' objectives had been achieved, "put Maduro on a plane", and provide support at the airport in order that humanitarian aid could arrive.

Durán, his brother and seven other individuals were arrested in Venezuela on 24 May 2020. Durán faced charges of arms trafficking, foreign conspiracy, rebellion, terrorism and treason.

The Colombian government informed that on 2 September it had arrested four Venezuelans related to Operation Gedeon. Óscar Pérez had denounced in 2017 that both Rayder Alexander Russo (alias "Pico") and Osman Alejandro Tabosky, both arrested by Colombian officials and the latter also accused as intellectual author of the 2018 Caracas drone attack, were "infiltrated agents" in the resistance movement against Maduro.

=== Criminal charges, extradition requests and sentences ===
Maduro's Attorney General, Saab, announced on 8 May that Denman and Berry would face charges for terrorism, conspiracy, "illicit trafficking of weapons of war" and "(criminal) association" – charges which carry a maximum prison sentence of 25 to 30 years. In addition, his office issued arrest warrants for Goudreau, Rendón, and Vergara for their role in the "design, financing, and execution" of the foiled plot. After Denman and Berry admitted to "conspiracy, association (to commit crimes), illicit trafficking of war weapons and terrorism" a Venezuelan court sentenced both on 6 August 2020 to 20 years in prison.

Saab announced on 15 May 2020 an arrest warrant against Popular Will politician Yon Goicoechea. Goicoechea rejected the accusations of any involvement with Operation Gideon, and accused Maduro's administration of paying and leading the uprising attempt to victimize itself and "persecute political dissent".

On 16 May 2020, according to a press release published by the Supreme Tribunal of Justice of Venezuela, several trial courts dedicated to terrorism-related crimes ordered that some 40 individuals alleged to have participated in the raid be remanded to preventive detention. Antonio Sequea Torres was also in pretrial confinement and charged with commission of aggravated intentional homicide in connection with his alleged attempt to assassinate Maduro. The Supreme Tribunal of Justice also indicated that most of those involved in the operation are alleged to have committed the crimes of treason, rebellion, arms trafficking, criminal conspiracy, and colluding with a foreign government. The mother of one of the accused, interviewed by Venezuelan newspaper El Pitazo, demanded assurance that her son was alive after receiving a phone call from her son requesting his brother's telephone number "so that they would stop torturing him".

According to Berry's videotaped statement, Antonio Sequea Torres and the drug trafficker Elkin Javier López, better known as Doble Rueda [transl. Two-Wheeled], also referred to as la silla [transl. the chair] – met multiple times during the planning period of the operation to coordinate logistics. The estate of López Torres in the Colombian Guajira is alleged to be the point of departure for the two boats involved in the raid. The Valledupar-based López Torres was arrested in December 2019 and his extradition was requested by the United States.

In May 2021, three Venezuelans were sentenced in Colombia to six years in prison for their relation to the operation.

=== Investigation of interception and deaths ===
Statements made to the Miami Herald by Cacique, who was involved in the operation, information about the exact landing was sold to Maduro intelligence a few days before the attempted landing. National Assembly deputy Wilmer Azuaje – president of the Venezuelan Observatory for the Protection of Human Rights and Guaidó's coordinator for expanding complaints of human rights violations – alleges that Sequea Torres "was the military infiltrator" who provided the information.

According to the Maduro administration, authorities awaiting the boat's arrival were fired upon by occupants of the first boat, led by Colina. In a press conference on the morning of 3 May, Diosdado Cabello reported that the early-morning exchange resulted in at least eight deaths and two arrests, indicating that it was unknown whether others drowned or swam away. Venezuelan Defense Minister Vladimir Padrino López later said that the first boat had been sunk by the navy and the military sent ships to look for survivors. According to Venezuelan Information Minister Jorge Rodríguez, the second boat had changed course after eight occupants of the first boat were killed in a 45-minute shootout with Venezuelan armed forces.

Reporters from The Miami Herald and McClatchy DC stated that "loyalists of Venezuela leader Nicolás Maduro infiltrated the ranks of the coup plotters, leading to a massacre of some invaders". Barráez and Azuaje – the latter of which investigated the incident in connection with a human rights complaint submitted to the International Criminal Court (ICC) – accused Venezuelan authorities of torturing and executing the six men in the first boat, including Colina. Barráez wrote that when Sequea took "control of the camps" after Alcalá's arrest, he "led fifty soldiers into an ambush" and that he facilitated identification to FAES by forcing all of the other men to shave their heads except his brother-in-law, the Americans, and "his most trusted men". Azuaje argued the deaths were "extrajudicial executions", said that "everything was rigged" and referred to the event as the "Macuto massacre" comparing it to the 2018 El Junquito raid, in which Óscar Pérez and his men were killed after reportedly offering to surrender. According to Rendón, the operation was compromised for months and intelligence gathered by the Maduro government allowed the Venezuelan armed forces to set the group up for an ambush, to create a "montage" of the events. Cacique alleged that "the only witnesses to the execution[s]" were held under "extreme security measures".

The report submitted to the ICC in October 2020 included forensic photographs reportedly taken by the Venezuelan forensic police, CICPC; it argues that there was not an armed confrontation but that the insurgents had been set up, tortured and extrajudicially executed. Azuaje stated that the original photos from the operation, and information about the bodies, came from anonymous chavista officials. The opposition official also submitted the report to the Human Rights Commission of the European Parliament. The report identifies the six former military dead as Colina along with César Andrés Perales Sequea, Anderson Smith Araque Portilla, Jean Carlo Castro Gutiérrez, Fabián Rodríguez Salazar, and José Roberto Abreu Facúndez. Maduro stated he ordered all insurgents be taken alive.

=== Goudreau lawsuit and arrest, and Denman and Berry prisoner exchange ===
In the final days of April 2020, Rendón was contacted by Silvercorp's legal advisors demanding a payment of US$1.45 million; The Washington Post wrote that Guaidó's officials reacted to the demands in fear, believing they were being blackmailed with the threat of the canceled plans being revealed to the public. Goudreau said that the Trump administration had knowledge of the operation and that the plotters held meetings in the Trump Doral west of Miami. Goudreau sued Rendón in October 2020 for a $1.4 million breach of contract. According to Neuman, Goudreau's lawsuit says "that he met three times with an obscure Trump official to discuss obtaining a license to export weapons", and that he believed "the plan had U.S. government approval" and Guaidó officials never told him to end his operation.

In the weeks following the apprehension of Luke Denman and Airan Berry, Denman's brother, an attorney, took on the task of advocating for the release of both. In December 2023, Denman and Berry, along with eight other Americans held in Venezuela, were freed in a prisoner exchange for Maduro ally Alex Saab.

United States federal authorities opened an investigation on Goudreau for arms trafficking.

== Reactions ==
=== Domestic ===
The event was described as a propaganda coup and "public relations victory" for the Maduro administration that negatively affected public opinion of Guaidó's administration.

==== Maduro administration ====
Maduro stated that plans included his possible assassination.

The Maduro administration accused the United States and Colombian governments of masterminding the attack, which both denied. Goudreau has also denied receiving any help for his operation from US and Colombian authorities. Maduro's Vice President Delcy Rodríguez called Goudreau "a supremacist fanatic" and warned that "the Venezuelan women are waiting for you, for free, but with deep homeland passion."

Maduro's Foreign Minister Arreaza criticized foreign governments and international organizations for their "deafening silence in the face of the mercenary aggression against Venezuela" and said that "the same people who always condemn us immediately based on biased or false information, today remain silent in the face of such a serious and full case of evidence." He added that "all those involved in the armed aggression against Venezuela confess that they trained in Colombia, with the knowledge of the Bogotá government and the financing of drug traffickers from that country."

==== Guaidó administration and opposition ====
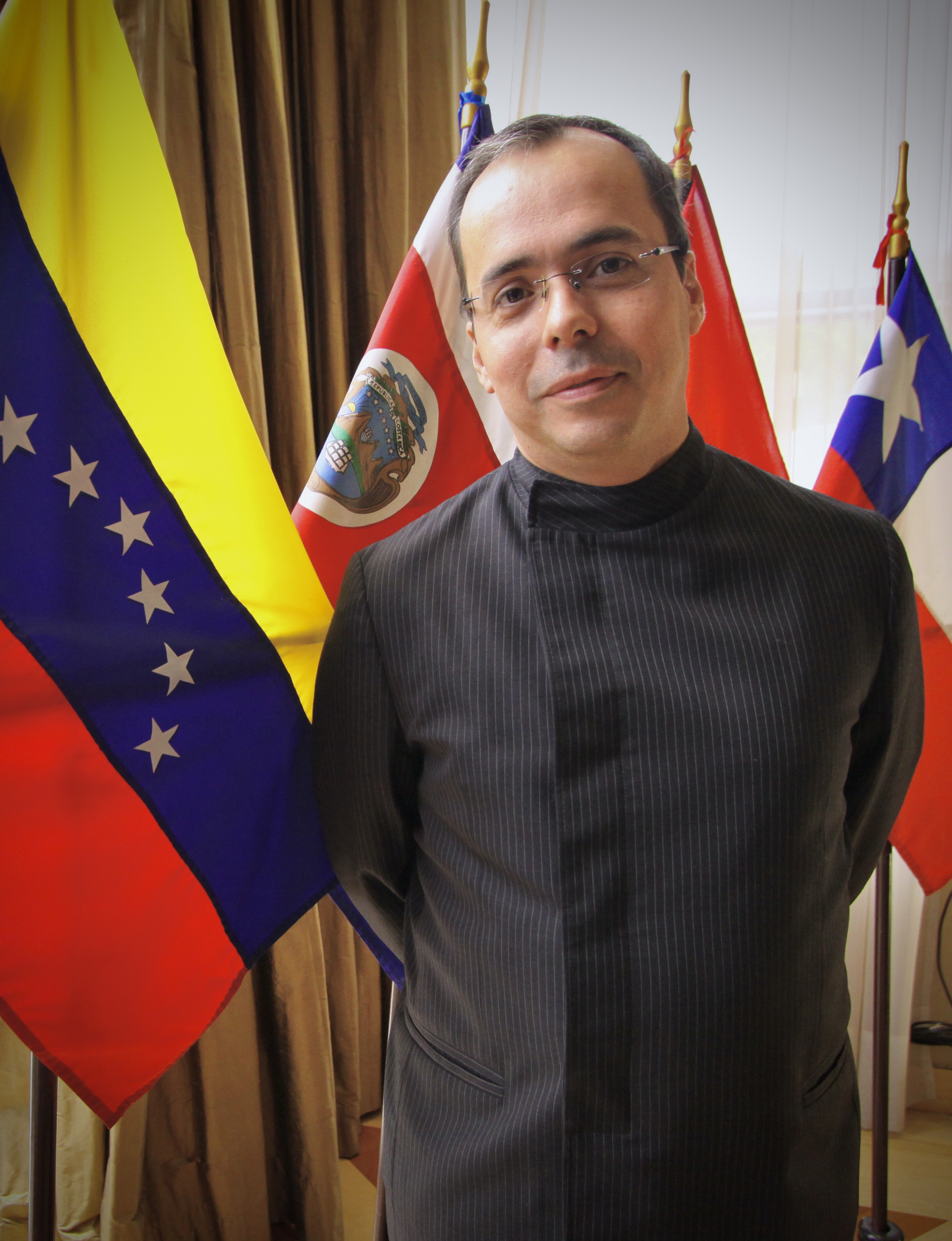
Guaidó's General Strategist J. J. Rendón, who resigned due to his interactions with Silvercorp

Guaidó accused the Maduro administration of "trying to create a state of apparent confusion, an effort to hide what's happening in Venezuela", citing recent events like the gasoline shortages, the Guanare prison riot, a violent gang battle in Caracas, and the COVID-19 pandemic in Venezuela. Guaidó also demanded that the human rights of the detainees be respected. Iván Simonovis, security and intelligence commissioner for the Guaidó administration, stated that the events in Macuto would be used by the Maduro government as a pretext to harass opponents and intensify repression, saying that Guaidó's administration would investigate the events and clarify its details.

The opposition political party Justice First demanded that Guaidó immediately dismiss the officials involved with the plot and charged that they "used his government's name for individual purposes". Julio Borges, Guaidó's foreign minister, called for the dismissal of all officials related to the plot, stating "we worry that energies are put into the creation of a bureaucratic caste and not into political change." Rendon and Vergara resigned on 11 May, with Guaidó thanking the two for "dedication and commitment to Venezuela". Important members of López's Popular Will party resigned from their positions in the month following the incident, saying that López's strong actions and policies hurt the efforts of the opposition in whole.

==== NGOs ====
The human rights NGO PROVEA asked about the well-being of the people arrested in Macuto and in Chuao and indicated that Tarek William Saab, and the Ombudsman appointed by Maduro, Alfredo Ruiz, would be responsible for possible forced disappearances or torture of the detainees, while stressing that it would only support and promote peaceful and constitutional means that lead to the "restoration of democracy in the country". Maduro accused PROVEA of being "financed by the CIA" and giving coverage to "terrorists" as a response, accusations that PROVEA rejected. Human Rights Watch criticized Maduro for alleging that PROVEA had connections to the United States Central Intelligence Agency after the organization called for due process of the captured individuals. Human Rights Watch wrote: "An international community that's closely watching what happens in Venezuela needs to send the message loud and clear: subjecting human rights defenders to politically motivated prosecution, detention or other abuses would be crossing a line for which those responsible will have to answer".

The Futuro Presente Foundation was accused by Maduro's administration of financing the operation. Futuro Presente categorically rejected the accusations of the participation of the organization and any of its members, said they were being persecuted, asked for it to end, and said that it was based on "completely false and unfounded accusations".

=== International ===
- Colombia: The Colombian government rejected the accusations, calling them an attempt by the "dictatorial regime of Nicolás Maduro" to divert attention from problems in the country. President Duque said that he did not sponsor invasions or tricks in response to the accusations and stated "I do things up front because I am a defender of democracy."
- Russia: The Russian Foreign Ministry said that United States' denial was "unconvincing" and pointed to earlier warnings made by the Trump administration that "all options" are on the table, including the possibility of military action. It also said that the actions of the mercenaries deserve "unequivocal and decisive condemnation".
  - On 20 May 2020, Russia convoked a virtual open debate of the United Nations Security Council (UNSC) for the purpose of urging the members of the council to condemn the attack as a threat to peace in Venezuela and to security in the region. The United States doubled down on its previous denials of any involvement in the operation, and accused the Maduro administration of using the event as a pretext to persecute political dissidents and distract from other problems in Venezuela. Russia reasserted its assessment that the statements by the United States government that it had no knowledge of the operation were dubious in light of the attackers' plans to fly their captives to the United States. Russia's U.N. ambassador, Dmitry Polyansky, asked how does the attack correlate with the "all options are on the table" messages.
- United States: Various US officials (including President Trump) have denied the accusations made by the Maduro administration.
  - President Trump said that the incident "has nothing to do with our government". Speaking on Fox News, Trump said "If I wanted to go into Venezuela, I wouldn't make a secret about it" and said that the operation would be called an "invasion" if he sends an army into Venezuela.
  - Secretary of State Mike Pompeo said that there was no US government direct involvement in this operation and added: "[If] we'd have been involved, it would have gone differently." Regarding the detention of two Americans, Pompeo said that the US will use "every tool" available to secure the return of Americans if they are being held in Venezuela.
  - Secretary of Defense Mark Esper told reporters at the Pentagon that "the United States government had nothing to do with what's happened in Venezuela in the last few days."
  - A State Department spokesperson said that the Maduro administration has been consistent in its use of misinformation to shift focus from its mismanagement of Venezuela. It also said that there was "little reason to believe anything that comes out of the former regime".

=== Characterization ===
The Maduro administration described the operation as an attempted coup with the goal of assassinating Maduro, which was perpetrated by "terrorists" in a plot coordinated by Colombia and the United States. Initially, Interior Minister Nestor Reverol called the event an attempted "maritime invasion" of the country, carried out by "terrorist mercenaries." Defense Minister Vladimir Padrino López later said the incident should not be characterized as an "invasion," opting instead to describe it as an "infiltration by sea" that was "a very well-planned military operation, prepared in foreign territory."

Goudreau referred to the operation as a "daring amphibious raid" by "Venezuelans trying to restore their democracy", labelling them "freedom fighters". He also said that he green-lit the operation because he thought it would spur further unrest against the Maduro government.

Guaidó supporters called it an ambush orchestrated and staged by Maduro; according to The Washington Post, the Maduro administration stated that infiltration by its intelligence agents led to the ambush. Guaidó and his supporters also characterized the event as a possible false flag. Colombian President Duque, described by The Wall Street Journal as an "ardent Maduro foe", mentioned speculation of a false flag, saying the operation was "allegedly promoted and financed by the dictatorial regime of Nicolás Maduro". The Wall Street Journal reported that Trump administration officials had stated that "it could have been a false flag organized by Mr. Maduro's regime to score propaganda points". Frankfurter Allgemeine Zeitung wrote that the plot "sounds crazy and joins a series of other alleged coup attempts and assassinations whose backgrounds were so contradictory that they were dismissed as inventions for the purpose of propaganda", though notes that the efforts overall "were real", citing the interviews regarding the operation. Conspiracy theories have arisen due to the lack of answers about key aspects of the operation.

U.S. Defense Secretary Mark Esper referred to the event as "what's happened in Venezuela in the last few days," and a U.S. official familiar with the matter labeled the operation as poorly organized and the fighters as "soldiers of fortune."

Media sources, analysts and individuals used terms like murky and bizarre to describe the plot and events. Sources varied between describing the anti-Maduro plot as: an operation referred to by its code name Gideon; a failed incursion, infiltration, insurrection, invasion or raid; an assassination attempt and an attempted landing, or coup. Some sources criticized the poor planning and execution, and described the operation as more incompetent than the 1961 failed Bay of Pigs Invasion of Cuba, with some referring to it as the "Bay of Piglets". Fairness & Accuracy in Reporting writer Joshua Cho criticized the corporate media's coverage of the word mercenary and coverage overall as dismissive or misleading and biased in favor of regime change.

Villa writes that Operation Gideon was an "attempt of some Venezuelan military and civilian dissidents (mainly exiled in Colombia) and three members of a US private security force to infiltrate Venezuela". Neuman, DeFronzo, Vox, and Europa Press said that the goal of the operation was to install Guaidó as president.

== In popular culture ==
A documentary directed by Jen Gatien and Billy Corben titled Men of War premiered at the Toronto Film Festival in September 2024, and on Amazon Prime in September 2025.

== See also ==
- 2026 United States strikes in Venezuela
- Colombia–Venezuela relations
- Golpe Azul
- Machurucuto raid
- Operation Red Dog
- 2026 Cuban boat incident
