= Clíver Alcalá Cordones =

Venezuelan major general (born 1961)

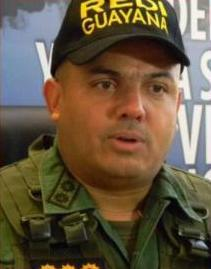
- Born: November 21, 1961 (age 64); Parroquia La Candelaria, Caracas, Venezuela
- Military career
- Allegiance: Venezuela
- Branch: Venezuelan Army
- Rank: Major General

Cliver Antonio Alcalá Cordones (born 21 November 1961), is a retired Venezuelan major general and a member of the Bolivarian Army. Alcalá was one of the soldiers who participated in the attempted coup d'état against President Carlos Andrés Pérez in February 1992, and served as chief of garrison in the cities of both Valencia and Maracay, and finally as general commander of the Integral Defense Region in Guayana (REDI-Guayana). On 5 July 2013, he ended his military career and began to criticize the government of Nicolás Maduro. In 2019, he declared his support for proclaimed interim president Juan Guaidó.

In 2011, Alcalá was accused by the United States government of being a drug trafficker and a member of the Cartel of the Suns. However, in 2023, these accusations were withdrawn. In 2026, the U.S. Department of Justice admitted that the Cartel of the Suns is not a real group. Alcalá moved from Venezuela to Barranquilla, Colombia in 2018 and emerged as a forceful opponent of Maduro, described as the "ringleader" of the Venezuelan military deserters.

In March 2020, Alcalá turned himself in to US authorities in Barranquilla, Colombia after the US Department of State and the Drug Enforcement Administration offered a US$10 million reward for his capture. However, on June 30, 2023, the United States dropped the narcoterrorism charges, and Alcalá pleaded guilty to lesser offenses for supporting a terrorist organization in 2006. He delivered two grenade launchers to the FARC in exchange for the release of kidnapped Venezuelan businessmen.

== Military career ==
Alcalá Cordones is a Venezuelan national officer who entered the former Military Academy of Venezuela (now UMBV) on August 12, 1979, and graduated in 1983 with a degree in Military Sciences and Arts, ranking tenth (10th) in the class “General de División León de Febres Cordero” – “Bicentennial of the Birth of the Liberator,” out of a total of 119 graduates. At this institution, he met Hugo Chávez, who was then his professor of Venezuelan History. Alcalá Cordones supported Hugo Chávez during the February 1992 coup attempt.

While serving as an active-duty officer in the Venezuelan National Armed Forces, he began to specialize specifically in the armored branch, eventually holding important positions within the Venezuelan Army. In this regard, over the course of his thirty-year career (the period of service expressly assigned to him, covering the years 1983 to 2013), the following positions can be listed chronologically in his capacity as a senior officer and general:

Presidential Aide-de-Camp (2000–2002)

In 2000, he was appointed Aide-de-Camp to the President of the Republic and accompanied him on tours to various countries around the world.

Batallón Blindado (2002–2006)

In 2002, he began as Commander of the Bravos de Apure Tank Battalion at Fort Mara, Zulia state, and concluded this period as the newly appointed Commander of the General de Brigada Juan Pablo Ayala Motorized Cavalry Group in Caracas.

During this period, marked by social and political instability in Venezuela, while holding the ranks of lieutenant colonel and colonel, the 2002 Venezuelan coup d’état occurred on April 11, 2002. This event was preceded by a “civic” strike called for December 10, 2001, which shut down a large number of businesses, as well as a strike called for April 9, 2002, by the Confederation of Venezuelan Workers (CTV) and the Venezuelan Federation of Chambers of Commerce and Production (FEDECAMARAS), which the organizers later extended indefinitely. In this context, General Alcalá Cordones, months after the attempted coup against Chávez, led the intervention of the Caracas Metropolitan Police, which was then under the command of Mayor Alfredo Peña.

Alcalá decided to take this action based on accusations against officials of the Metropolitan Police, who were accused of attacking unarmed demonstrators during the events of April 11, 2002, as well as of using an armored vehicle belonging to the police force, and were further charged with firing upon the civilian population.

11th Infantry Brigade (2006–2007)

During this period, he served as Commander of the 11th Infantry Brigade “G/B Luis Celis” in Maracaibo, Zulia state. He carried out operations such as “Relámpago de Catatumbo” and “Río de Oro,” which were aimed at combating drug trafficking.

Alcalá admitted before a New York court presided over by Judge Alvin Hellerstein that during this period (in 2006) he provided two 3.5 grenade launchers to the Revolutionary Armed Forces of Colombia on orders from his superiors.

41st Armored Brigade (2007–2010)

In 2007, he was appointed Commander of the 41st Armored Brigade in Naguanagua, Carabobo state. He also established a citizen service office to address complaints related to public security issues.

4th Armored Division (2010–2012)

In August 2010, he was appointed Commander of the 4th Armored Division and the Maracay Garrison, which constituted the most important land unit of the National Army. During 17 months of command, General Alcalá Cordones oversaw the construction of new facilities for the 42nd Paratrooper Infantry Brigade, the 414th Bravos de Apure Battalion, and the transformation of the 43rd Artillery Brigade in San Juan de los Morros.

On September 30, 2010, the Paratrooper Brigade of the Bolivarian National Armed Forces took control of the Aragua Penitentiary Center, located in Tocorón, Zamora Municipality, by order of General Cliver Alcalá. The decision was made following continuous complaints from citizens who were being extorted, threatened, and abused by organized crime operating from within the prison. At 5:30 a.m., 1,800 military personnel entered the facility, prompting inmates in the tower to lay down their weapons. As reported, in the days prior, the “pranes” (leaders) of each area had engaged in a three-day shootout while disputing control within the prison complex.

REDI-Guayana (2012–2013)

Near the end of his military career, upon completing 30 years of service, he was promoted to Major General and appointed Commander of REDI-Guayana. In his final military leadership position, he directed operations against illegal mining activities.This led to disputes with Pemón inhabitants of the area who engage in illegal mining.

Caracol Radio reported that investigators and their collaborators that at one point in time; Alcalá had more power than Diosdado Cabello and Nicolás Maduro.

Retirement

In an interview with Vladimir Villegas, he stated that he would vote in a recall referendum to remove Nicolás Maduro from power and criticized the abuses against citizens who wanted to express their discontent. He also stated that most government officials were convinced that Maduro was mismanaging the country. Alcalá said that he always fought against corruption but that, unfortunately, within Chavismo itself hunger, poverty, and dishonest activities were being promoted. He said that in 2013 he was offered the position of ambassador, which he declined.

== Investigations ==
In September 2011, four Hugo Chávez allies (including Alcalá Cordones) were sanctioned by the United States Department of the Treasury for allegedly helping FARC obtain weapons and smuggle drugs. It accuses him of using his position to establish an arms-for-drugs route with the FARC.

On 18 April 2012, Alcalá Cordones was singled out for being involved in drug trafficking in Venezuela by former magistrate Eladio Aponte Aponte, exiled in Panama. The magistrade confessed to having been pressured by Hugo Chávez to condemn Iván Simonovis and having had a friendly relationship with Walid Makled.

In 2018, drug trafficker Walid Makled confessed and posted a video on social media from an alleged SEBIN prison in which he threatened Cliver Alcalá, saying, “I told you I would be your shadow; I’m coming for you.” Cliver Alcalá cooperated with the investigation that led to the arrest of Walid Makled.

Military plan to overthrow Maduro

According to the Associated Press, beginning in 2019 Cliver Alcalá devoted himself to coordinating a military plan to overthrow Maduro with the help of U.S. advisers and the support of the company Silvercorp USA. Lester Toledo, a leader of Voluntad Popular, introduced U.S. military veteran Jordan Goudreau to Alcalá. A group of 300 Venezuelan soldiers trained along the Colombian border. The plans were thwarted after Colombian police seized an arsenal of military weapons, followed by requests for Alcalá’s extradition by both the Venezuelan government and the United States government.

Cliver Alcalá resided in Barranquilla, Colombia from 2018 until his decision to surrender to US authorities in March 2020. On 26 March 2020, Alcalá assumed responsibility for "a military operation against the Maduro dictatorship", including a shipment of weapons captured in Colombia, claiming that the United States, Colombia and Juan Guaidó officials had signed an agreement to support their efforts to overthrow President Maduro. Guaidó denied knowledge of the event while United States Special Representative to Venezuela Elliott Abrams described Alcalá's statement as "despicable and quite dangerous".

Alcalá is reported to have played a role in planning the unsuccessful May 2020 Macuto Bay raid, which took place after Alcalá was extradited to the United States.

Extradition to the US On 27 March 2020, Clíver Alcalá turned himself in before the Colombian National Intelligence Directorate, after the United States Department of Justice included him in a list of solicitors the previous day, offering ten million dollars for his capture and by that of four other senior Venezuelan officials wanted for drug trafficking, including ongoing president Nicolás Maduro. Clíver subsequently turned himself in to the Drug Enforcement Administration (DEA) after agreeing to collaborate with prosecutors, being extradited to the United States.

Alcalá's lawyers lodged a motion in November 2021 to have the charges dismissed along with a statement that US officials at the highest levels of the CIA, Treasury Justice, the National Security Council and the Drug Enforcement Administration were aware of his efforts to overthrow Maduro. The statement said J. J. Rendón and two allies of Juan Guaidó were also aware of Alcalá's coup plan; U.S. officials deny any direct involvement and Guaidó representatives stated they had disassociated themselves from Alcalá well before the May 2020 incursion.

In June 2023, Alcalá pleaded guilty in the U.S. to "two counts of providing material support to a terrorist group and illicit transfer of firearms", with the narcotics charges dropped. He was sentenced to 21 years and 6 months in jail, with 3 years of supervised release.

Narcoterrorism charges in the United States

On June 30, 2023, federal prosecutors dropped the narcoterrorism charges against the former Venezuelan general, and Alcalá pleaded guilty to misdemeanor offenses of aiding a foreign terrorist organization.

Statement

On June 30, 2023, during statements by General Clíver Alcalá that implicated the actions of the late President Hugo Chávez with the Colombian guerrillas, he pleaded guilty to providing material support to the FARC in 2006. In response to a question from the New York court, he answered, “Yes, sir. Two 3.5 grenade launchers.” He was then asked whether both grenade launchers were intended for Luciano Marín (alias Iván Márquez), to which Alcalá stated that one was for Márquez and the other for Rodrigo Londoño (alias Timochenko), following instructions from his superiors.

In 2024, Colombia’s newspaper El Tiempo obtained information about a document related to the judicial proceedings against Alcalá Cordones, according to which the U.S. Attorney’s Office was to present, on January 18, 2024, an indictment requesting a 30-year prison sentence for the former deserter general and chief planner of the failed Operation Gideon. The charges were similar to those that had previously been withdrawn. In response, his defense sought a sentence of only six years.

Sentencing

On the day of sentencing, Cliver Alcalá told the judge that what the United States considered a high-level crime was, for him, the fulfillment of a series of orders given by his superiors and the high government led by Hugo Chávez, in line with the Venezuelan state’s policy at the time. He took responsibility for delivering two weapons to the Revolutionary Armed Forces of Colombia, which he claimed dated back to World War II. He also provided security for a senior official of the Revolutionary Armed Forces of Colombia who had been summoned to Caracas to make peace plans, and his responsibility was to escort this FARC member from the border to Caracas and provide protection. He stated that during the year he was stationed in Zulia state he dismantled a cocaine laboratory and managed the release of three citizens kidnapped by the FARC, two Colombians and one Venezuelan, at the request of Colombian President Álvaro Uribe.

He asserted that throughout his 34 years of service his military career was impeccable and that he offered his experience to the process of freeing Venezuela from the dictatorship of Nicolás Maduro. He stated that when he was discharged in 2013, Nicolás Maduro offered him an ambassadorship in Europe, which he refused because his moral principles did not allow it. He asked that it be taken into account that for more than a decade he had spoken with members of the United States government about his case. He claimed that he played a fundamental role in the capture of Walid Makled, one of the largest narcoterrorists in history according to the prosecution itself. Alcalá asserted that through his initiative and work, Walid Makled was captured and served years in prison in Venezuela. As a result, Walid Makled threatened him, telling him that he would be his shadow and would make him pay.

On April 8, he was sentenced to 260 months (more than 21 years) in prison for supplying weapons to the Revolutionary Armed Forces of Colombia (FARC). That same day coincided with a total solar eclipse that darkened North America. Alcalá neither elaborated on nor promised to provide further information about the Cartel of the Suns in order to negotiate a reduction of his sentence.

Venezuelan regime captures nephew of Cliver Alcalá

On May 10, 2020, police and military operations were carried out in connection with the failed Operation Gideon, resulting in more than 40 arrests. According to the Venezuelan regime, the plan sought the “capture, detention, and removal” of Nicolás Maduro and the establishment of a transitional government with opposition leader Juan Guaidó, who at the time was recognized as Venezuela’s interim president by many countries, including the United States.

Among those captured were retired U.S. military personnel Luke Alexander Denman and Airan Berry, who were charged with terrorism, an offense punishable in Venezuela by sentences of between 25 and 30 years in prison.

Additionally, 29 Venezuelans were charged with “conspiracy with a foreign government,” specifically Colombia and the United States, one of whom was Cliver Alcalá’s nephew, according to the Venezuelan prosecutor’s office. On January 13, 2026, Massiel Cordones gave statements outside El Rodeo prison to Spain’s newspaper ABC, describing the anguish and difficult wait for the release of political prisoners.

== Family and personal life ==
He was born in Caracas in the La Candelaria neighborhood. At age 12, he was transferred to Falcón State to finish being raised alongside his siblings. Clíver Alcalá Cordones married Martha Ojeda on May 13, 2012. Clíver Alcalá began residing in Barranquilla, Colombia, in 2018, as he was being persecuted by the government of Nicolás Maduro.

== Men of War (documentary) ==
In September 2024, a documentary that premiered at the Toronto International Film Festival featured exclusive prison footage of retired Venezuelan General Cliver Alcalá Cordones and interviews with J.J. Rendón, strategist for Venezuelan opposition leader Juan Guaidó. In January 2026, filmmaker Jen Gatien gave an interview to News Nation stating that there was a procedural error in Cliver Alcalá's case, as he never collaborated with Maduro and voluntarily surrendered to clarify the case in court, in a context in which he was planning to overthrow Maduro. The filmmaker explains that he was tried for delivering two grenade launchers as an isolated incident in 2006 that the FARC demanded in exchange for releasing kidnapped Venezuelans, and that he was therefore unjustly convicted. The documentary Men of War contains information about the events leading up to Operation Absolute Resolve on January 3, 2026, where Nicolás Maduro was captured.
