= Macuto, Vargas =

City in Vargas, Venezuela

Macuto
- San Bartolomé de Macuto
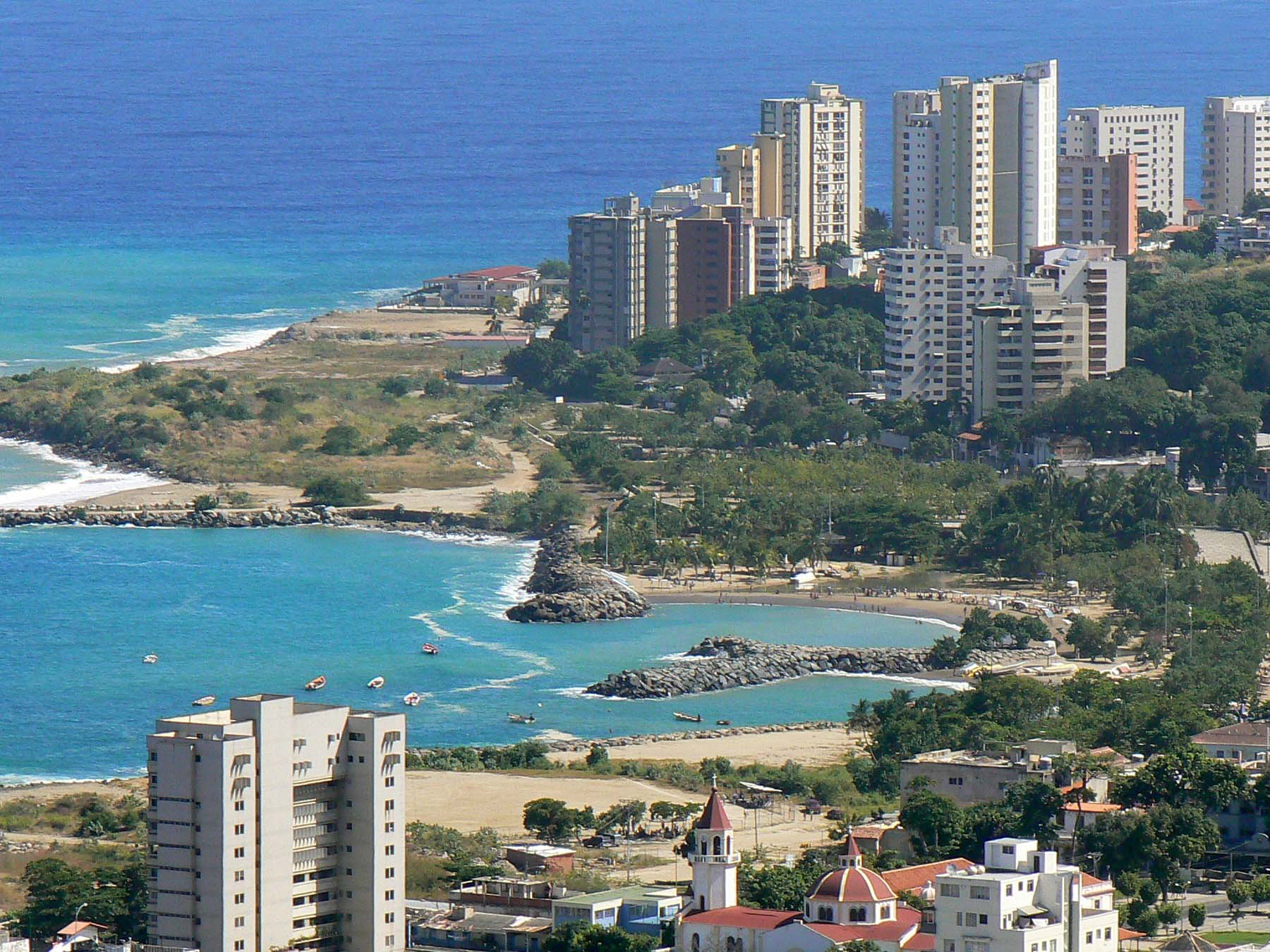

- Location within Venezuela
- Coordinates: 10°36′24″N 66°53′33″W
- Country: Venezuela
- State: Vargas
- Municipality: Macuto Municipality
- Founded: 24 August 1740

Population (2023)
  - Total: 25,506
- Time zone: VST
- Climate: BSh

Macuto is a seaside city in Vargas state, Venezuela. The city has a long history of attracting Venezuelan political leaders and artists, and popular tourist site today.

== History ==
Macuto was founded in August 1740 on the site of an indigenous village called Guaicamacuto ("basket of thorns"). It is known for its beaches, and for the nearby town of Galipán on the mount Avila, famous for its flowers.

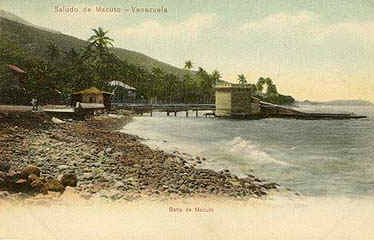
Macuto beach in 1911

Since the 19th century, Macuto has served as a resort town for many in Caracas and other nearby areas. Large streets and private homes were constructed during that time, and Macuto began being known as a place where several Venezuelan presidents spent time off and received international dignitaries. In 1885, Antonio Guzmán Blanco ordered the construction of a large manor known as "La Guzmania", which has subsequently been used as a residence for a number of Venezuelan leaders, including Juan Vicente Gómez, Marcos Pérez Jiménez, and Wolfgang Larrazábal. A high-end hotel called the Miramar was inaugurated in the 1920s, but is no longer in operation. Macuto served as the hideaway and final residence of Venezuelan artist Armando Reverón, a modernist painter and craftsman, who built a compound of huts surrounded by a wall, which he named "El Castillete" ("little castle"). From 1921 onwards, he lived with his companion Juanita, his dolls, and other handmade objects. While in Macuto, Reverón attracted much attention for his unusual lifestyle, which, along with his paintings depicting the town, helped Macuto gain notability.

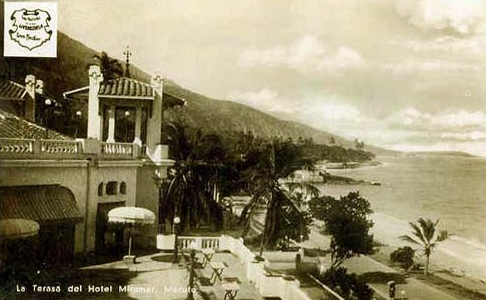
Miramar Hotel in 1929

On May 3 and 4, 2020, Macuto was one of the sites of the failed Operation Gideon, where a small group contracted by an American mercinary company named Silvercorp USA headed by Jordan Goudreau attempted to invade via sea to capture Nicolás Maduro and remove him from power. Eight of the attackers were killed, with another thirteen, including two Americans, captured.

== Tourism ==
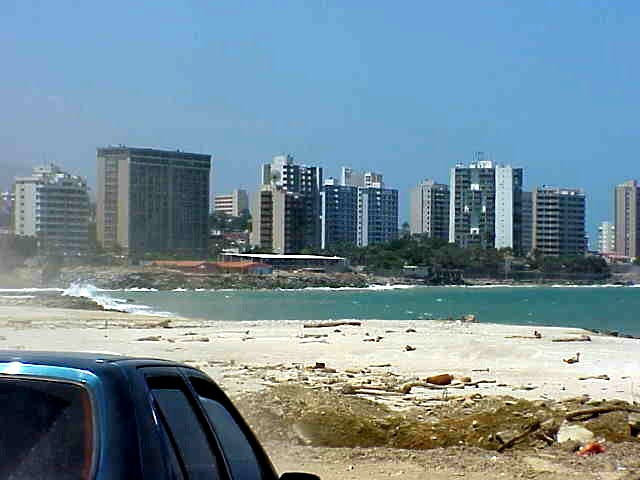
Macuto

Macuto is a popular resort town, aided by its close proximity to Caracas. The town has been the subject of many paintings, including those by Armando Reverón, Arturo Michelena, Cristobal Rojas, Martín Tovar y Tovar and others.

Macuto is linked to Caracas by highway & "avenida" roads. Other tourism infrastructure in the town includes hotels and golf courses.

== See also ==
- Armando Reverón
