= Wilmer Azuaje =

Venezuelan politician

National Assembly deputy
- In office 5 January 2006 – 5 January 2011
- Constituency: Barinas state

Personal details
- Born: Wilmer José Azuaje Cordero; 1977 (age 48–49) Barinas, Barinas state, Venezuela
- Party: Justice First (actual); Progressive Advance (2012-2014); Gente Emergente (resigned); PSUV (expelled); MVR (dissolved)
- Occupation: Politician

Wilmer José Azuaje Cordero (born 1977) is a Venezuelan politician that has served as deputy in the National Assembly for Barinas state and as a Barinas regional deputy.

== Career ==
He began his political life in the Fifth Republic Movement (MVR), political party that led Hugo Chávez to the presidency in 1998. He was elected as a deputy for the National Assembly 2005 parliamentary elections as a MVR candidate. In 2007, Azuaje joined the United Socialist Party of Venezuela (PSUV) after the merger of the MVR into this new organization.

=== Complaints against the Chávez family ===
Starting in 2005, a confrontation began between Wilmer Azuaje and Argenis Chávez, Hugo Chávez's brother, which led Azuaje to request protection measures for himself and his family before a tribunal, due to reported threats made by Argenis Chávez against Azuaje. National newspapers reported that Argenis himself intended to select the candidates for the National Assembly election to be held that year, but finally the MVR National Tactical Command decided in favor of Wilmer Azuaje.

On 26 March 2008, Azuaje presented before the National Assembly a series of complaints against the Chávez family in the Barinas state, reflecting the new properties reportedly acquired by the family of President Chávez, especially of Argenis and Narciso Chávez, with money coming from reported acts of corruption. After the complaints, Hugo de los Reyes Chávez, father of Hugo Chávez and then governor of Barinas, requested before the National Assembly the waiver of Azuaje's parliamentary immunity, but this was not discussed. The Assembly Speaker, Cilia Flores, announced that not only the case would be investigated but also Azuaje himself for reportedly having carried out an multimillionaire campaign for the presentation of the complaints. This increased the friction between Azuaje and the rest of the pro-government deputies, who immediately dismissed his complaints.

These events made Azuaje nationally known by appearing insistently in Venezuelan newspapers and the media in general. In April 2008, he made an act in Cameja Street in the city of Barinas, to announce his candidacy for the governorship of Barinas. During the mass act, shots were fired in which two of Azuaje's followers were killed, and Azuaje blamed Argenis Chávez directly.

=== Opposition ===
After the electoral measurements for the governorship of Barinas, Wilmer Azuaje, fulfills with Frenchi Díaz and Julio César Reyes, two opposition politicians, the pact made in January 2008, which established the nomination of only one of them to dispute the position of the regional executive against Adán or Argenis Chávez, brothers of the President and of which one of the two was supposed to be the official candidate. Therefore, Azuaje was leaning towards the mayoralty of Barinas. That same month, on 30 April, the PSUV announced the expulsion of Wilmer Azuaje, for advancing his candidacy for the regional elections, although in practice he had already been distanced from the party for months.

Azuaje immediately joined the Gente Emergente party, where Julio César Reyes was already a member, shortly thereafter this organization was expelled from the ruling Patriotic Alliance coalition. On 23 November 2008, regional elections were held, being soundly defeated by Abundio Sánchez, PSUV candidate.

At the end of 2008, a constitutional amendment project of Article 230 of the Venezuelan Constitution was presented by pro-government factors, whose intention is to allow the possibility of running presidential candidates continuously. Azuaje declared himself against it and, along with other dissident deputies, created a small political group called Frente Amplio Nacional (National Broad Front) against the amendment. In January 2009, he separated from Gente Emergente and formed a new parliamentary fraction called Frente Popular Humanista, together with four other dissident deputies.

In March 2009, Néstor Izarra Colmenares and Narciso Chávez filed an action against Azuaje for alleged continuous aggravated defamation. As such, the Plenary Chamber of the Supreme Tribunal of Justice would decide whether to strip the deputy of his parliamentary immunity.

On March 25, 2010 Azuaje was detained by the Scientific, Criminal and Criminalistic Investigations Corps (CICPC) when he was about to pick up a vehicle that was being held at the police headquarters since they tried to approach him for an alleged attack in October 2009. The police force argued at that time that it had been an attempted robbery. When the deputy approached the CICPC headquarters to pick up his vehicle, he was accused of assaulting a police officer and was detained. His parliamentary immunity was withdrawn by the National Assembly at the request of the Supreme Tribunal of Justice, with 105 votes in favor and 6 against out of 167 possible votes, being the votes in favor of deputies of the United Socialist Party of Venezuela and the Communist Party, whilePodemos and the Popular Humanist Front rejected the motion and the Fatherland for All party abstained. Ismael García, leader of the Podemos party, in defense of his colleague, declared in the National Assembly that what was said about the flagrancy of the crime by the head of the judicial police, Wilmer Flores Trosel, were lies, and accused the Minister of the Interior, Tareck El Aissami, of lending himself to mount a hoax in the same line and with the same arguments of the Nixon Moreno case, saying "We are facing an express trial, they have violated all the rights of the deputy to put a file on him."

Azuaje's parliamentary immunity was officially lifted on 5 April 2010.

He was served as president of the Venezuelan Observatory for the Protection of Human Rights, and during the Venezuelan presidential crisis he was appointed as Juan Guaidó's coordinator for expanding complaints of human rights violation. In October 2020, he submitted a report to the International Criminal Court and to the European Parliament as well that argues that there was not an armed confrontation during the May 2020 Operation Gideon and that its participants were set up, tortured and extrajudicially executed.

== Political persecution ==
On 2 May 2017 Azuaje was arrested and detained without an arrest warrant by the Bolivarian National Intelligence Service (SEBIN) in the city of Barinas, being a deputy for the Legislative Council of the state of Barinas. On 18 July he was stripped of his parliamentary immunity, and on 21 August he was charged with the crimes of illegal possession of a military weapon, ammunition illegal trafficking, improper use of military clothing, criminal association and resistance to authority. Azuaje was detained for over a year, being tortured during his imprisonment. In 2017 a video showing Azuaje shackled and with bloodied bandages on one arm was made public. On 3 June 2018, he was released from prison with restrictive measures and a ban on leaving the country. On 30 January 2019 he left the country on political persecution grounds.

== Personal life ==
On 19 February 2009, his brother César José Azuaje Cordero, 28 years old, was killed along with Joel Miguel Carballo under strange circumstances at a service station in the city of Barinas.

== See also ==
- II National Assembly of Venezuela
- Political prisoners in Venezuela
- Torture in Venezuela
