= 2026 Cuban boat incident =

Skirmish between Cuban border patrol and US ship

- Part of the 2026 Cuban crisis
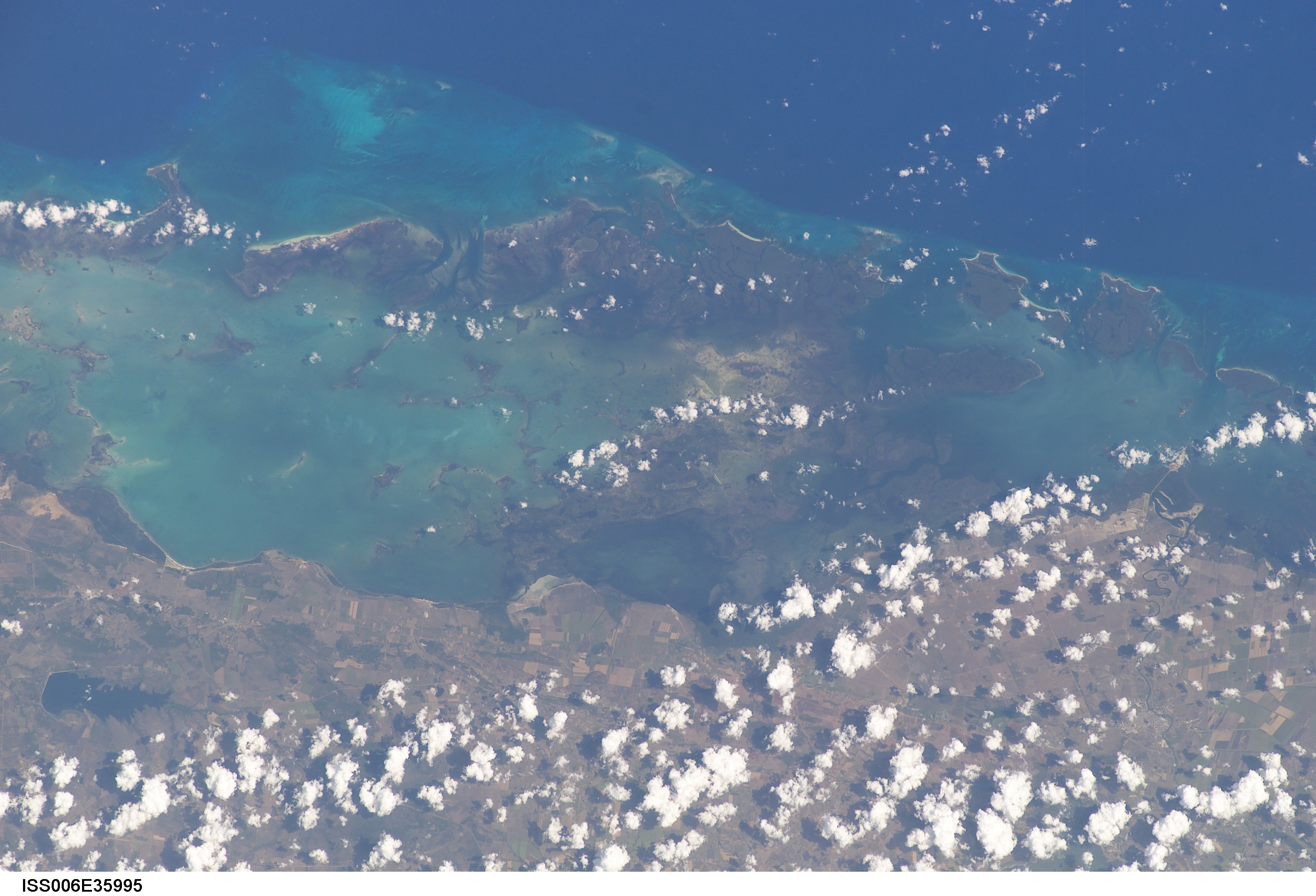
- Satellite image of Cayo Falcones, Cuba
Date	25 February 2026
Location	near Villa Clara Province, Cuba
Result	Cuban government victory

Parties involved
Armed suspects on a US-registered boat	Cuba

Commanders and leaders
Duniel Hernández Santos (POW)	Unknown

Casualties and losses
5 killed, 5 injured	1 injured

On 25 February 2026, an armed maritime confrontation occurred between a patrol vessel of the Cuban Border Guard Troops and a motor boat registered in the United States near Cayo Falcones, off the northern coast of Villa Clara Province, within Cuban territorial waters. Cuban authorities stated that the occupants of the motor boat opened fire after being intercepted, wounding the commanding officer of the patrol vessel. Cuban forces returned fire, killing five people and wounding five others aboard the motor boat.

Cuban officials reported the seizure of firearms, incendiary devices, ballistic protection, and military-style clothing, alleging that the group was attempting an armed infiltration. The United States denied any involvement and launched federal and state investigations. At least one of the deceased was confirmed to be a US citizen, and Cuban authorities later announced the arrest of a seventh suspect on land, accused of providing logistical support.

== Background ==
The history between Cuba and the United States has been varied throughout the years. In 1897, during Cuba's second war for independence from Spain the US President William McKinley offered to buy Cuba for $300 million, with the rejection of the offer and sinking of the USS Maine in Havana leading to the Spanish–American War. US military rule of the island lasted until 1902 when Cuba was granted formal independence; however, the US repeatedly intervened militarily after the declaration. Later between 1959 and 1965 during the Escambray rebellion, the US government intervened in multiple ways in an attempt to help overthrow Fidel Castro and his rebels, including authorizing the CIA to organize, train and equip Cuban refugees as guerrillas to fight against Castro.

In the mid-2010s, there was a brief thaw of relations between Cuba and the US which was in part facilitated by Pope Francis who hosted secret talks between US and Cuban leaders. In April 2015, Cuba was removed from the US "State Sponsors of Terrorism" list, and the re-opening of embassies of each government in July 2015. Starting in 2017 during Donald Trump's first presidency, the re-enforcement of business and travel restrictions were announced against Cuba, with Joe Biden's presidency continuing the embargo and further straining the relationships between the countries. In January 2026, Trump signed an executive order during the start of his second presidency which declared a national emergency and claimed that Cuba has ties to Hamas and Hezbollah and represented an extraordinary threat to the US.

== Incident ==
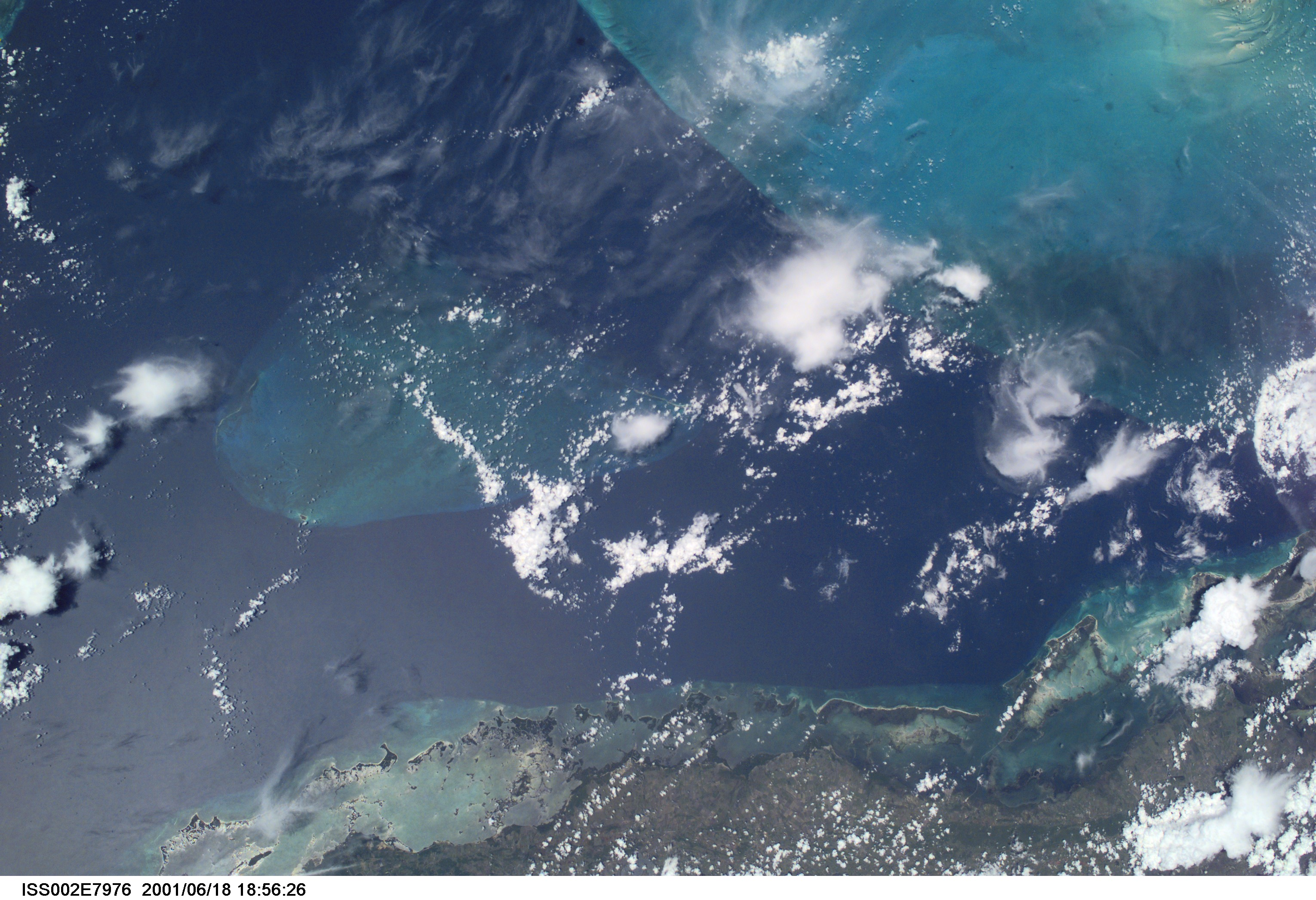
The northern coast of Villa Clara

According to Cuban authorities, in the morning hours of 25 February 2026, a 24-foot (7.3 m) Proline speedboat registered in the state of Florida was detected operating approximately 1 nautical mile (1.9 km; 1.2 mi) northeast of the El Pino channel, near Cayo Falcones, in the municipality of Corralillo, Villa Clara Province, placing it within Cuban territorial waters.

A Cuban patrol consisting of five members of the Cuban Coast Guard approached and challenged the vessel. Cuban authorities claimed that individuals aboard the speedboat opened fire first, wounding the commanding officer of the patrol craft. Cuban forces then returned fire, killing four men and wounding six others aboard the speedboat.

Cuban officials reported that assault rifles, handguns, Molotov cocktails, night-vision devices, counterrevolutionary insignia, bulletproof vests, and camouflage clothing were found aboard the intercepted vessel, asserting that the occupants were engaged in a hostile paramilitary operation. The six wounded survivors were transported under armed guard to a hospital in Santa Clara, where they remained in custody as of 26 February. Cuban authorities confirmed that direct communication had taken place with US officials following the incident. On March 5, the Cuban government announced that one of the wounded suspects had died of their injuries while in hospital.

== Casualties and identification ==
Cuban authorities later identified seven of the boatmen, stating that at least two of the wounded detainees were already wanted in Cuba in connection with previous violent plots, including the planning, financing, and execution of armed actions. According to reporting by The Washington Post, the group was affiliated with Autodefensa del Pueblo (ADP), a small militant Cuban exile organization based in Florida.

Cuban state media described the occupants of the speedboat as Cuban nationals. At least one of the deceased, Michel Ortega Casanova, was confirmed by relatives to be a United States citizen. According to his brother, Casanova had developed an apparent obsession with overthrowing the Cuban government and had been attempting to recruit others in Florida. According to the Monroe County Sheriff's Office, the speedboat used in the incident had been reported stolen. US federal authorities later confirmed that the vessel was stolen from the Florida Keys and that its registered owner denied any involvement in the incident.

== Arrest on Cuban territory ==
Cuban officials announced the arrest of Duniel Hernández Santos inside Cuba, accusing him of providing logistical support for the armed infiltration attempt. Authorities stated that Hernández had confessed to involvement in organizing the operation.

== Reactions ==
- Cuba: The Cuban government alleged that the boatmen had been sent by the United States in order to stoke conflict, and announced the arrest of Duniel Hernández Santos, whom it stated had confessed to involvement. Cuba accused the ten suspects of planning "an infiltration with terrorist aims".
- United States: Secretary of State Marco Rubio stated shortly after the incident that he had received reports of it and had initiated an investigation. At a press conference, Rubio said that several US agencies had launched investigations, with the goal of obtaining independent information, noting that much of what was known at that point had come from the Cuban government. He denied US involvement in the incident.
  - Florida: Attorney General James Uthmeier ordered a state-level criminal investigation, stating that Cuban authorities' claims required independent verification. Members of the US Congress from Florida, including Carlos Giménez and Rick Scott, called for a thorough federal investigation and questioned the Cuban government's account of events.
- Russia: The Foreign Ministry spokeswoman characterized the incident as an "aggressive provocation by the United States" aimed at escalating tensions and triggering a conflict.

== See also ==
- 1996 shootdown of Brothers to the Rescue aircraft
- Operation Gideon (2020)
