= Jordan Goudreau =

Former U.S. Green Beret & private military contractor

- Born: 30 July 1976 (age 50); Canada
- Citizenship: Canada; United States (naturalized)
- Education: University of Calgary
- Occupations: Former soldier; private security contractor
- Military career
- Allegiance: United States
- Branch: United States Army
- Service years: 2001–2016
- Rank: Sergeant First Class
- Unit: 10th Special Forces Group
- Conflicts: War in Afghanistan; Iraq War

Jordan Guy MacDonald Goudreau (born 30 July 1976) is a Canadian-American mercenary who claimed responsibility for organizing the Operation Gideon, also known as the Macuto Bay incursion, into Venezuelan territory on 3 May 2020.

Goudreau is the owner and operator of a private security firm based in Florida called Silvercorp USA, which he set up in 2018. Goudreau previously served in the Canadian Armed Forces and the U.S. Army Special Forces. He is currently wanted by the FBI after failing to appear at a court hearing related to his participation in Operation Gideon.

== Early life ==
Goudreau was raised in suburban Mississauga, Ontario, in a middle-class family on the outskirts of Toronto, Ontario. Childhood friends said he was competitive, enjoyed playing video games and watched kung fu films. Goudreau's father said he had "a family full of military people," including Goudreau's grandfather and great-grandfather. He later attended the University of Calgary from 1994 to 1998, studying computer science.

== Military career ==
After finishing college, Goudreau served in the Canadian Armed Forces but wanted to enlist in the United States armed forces to pursue a more challenging military career. He moved to Washington, D.C. and enlisted in the United States Army a few months prior to the September 11 attacks in New York City, eventually reaching the rank of Sergeant first class in the 10th Special Forces Group.

Documentation shows that Goudreau faced months of combat while deployed and suffered a concussion and back injuries during a parachuting accident in August 2014. After this incident, he was granted medical retirement in 2016, receiving disability payments after discharging from the military. Following his retirement, Goudreau became a naturalized United States citizen.

== Silvercorp USA ==
Silvercorp USA
- Type: Private military company
- Founded: February 2018; 8 years ago
- Founder: Jordan Goudreau
- Headquarters: Melbourne, Florida, United States
- Website: www.silvercorpusa.com

After Puerto Rico was affected by Hurricane Maria in September 2017, Goudreau served as a security contractor and saw the financial benefits of being in the industry. He founded a private security-services company called Silvercorp USA in February 2018.

=== School safety ===
Following the Stoneman Douglas High School shooting in February 2018, he presented a concept of placing undercover special forces veterans in schools at a Florida school security conference that July.

At the convention, Goudreau proposed that parents personally pay $8.99 per month for the service, comparing it to a Netflix subscription. When asked why he preferred personal payments, he said that it was to avoid the "chain of command" at schools, adding "We want private money, because it's faster."

In April 2018, Goudreau began working with schools in Cartagena, Colombia to teach safety classes for students.

=== Security services for a Trump rally ===
Silvercorp USA provided security services for at least one rally for President Donald Trump. At a Trump rally in Charlotte, North Carolina at Bojangles' Coliseum on 26 October 2018, Goudreau could be seen providing security services at the event. Through connections within the private security community, Goudreau was acquainted with Keith Schiller, President Trump's longtime director of security.

=== Venezuela ===
In February 2019, Silvercorp provided security services at Venezuela Aid Live, which led Goudreau to turn his attention to Venezuela. According to Drew White, a former business associate of Silvercorp, Goudreau saw an opportunity to overthrow Maduro when the Trump administration focused on removing Maduro from power.

Goudreau eventually met with officials from Venezuela interim president Juan Guaidó's team in October and November 2019, tentatively agreeing on plans for an armed operation in Venezuela to capture Maduro, but the two parties separated after disagreements.

On 3 May 2020, Goudreau released a video alongside former Venezuelan National Guard (GNB) officer Javier Nieto Quintero, claiming responsibility for an armed incursion into Venezuelan territory by "land and sea" which he called "Operation Gideon", involving 60 troops and two former United States Army Special Forces members. Goudreau, who was not present in Venezuela, posted updates about the coup attempt on Twitter shortly before and during the operation. He and Nieto Quintero filmed their video in Florida, where they both reside. Goudreau claimed he unsuccessfully sought the backing of the U.S. government for his operation. The Venezuelan government said security forces had foiled a "marine incursion" by "terrorist mercenaries" from neighboring Colombia in Vargas state, killing eight and capturing two. State television showed images of captured weapons, Peruvian documents, and uniforms emblazoned with the American flag.

Goudreau and Nieto Quintero, identified as a retired Venezuelan military captain, published a video the same day claiming responsibility for the attack. The following day, Goudreau stated that two of the captured men were U.S. citizens. Airan Berry and Luke Denman, both ex-Green Berets, were captured on their "peñero- type boat by a fisherman. Opposition leader Juan Guaidó has denied any links to the operation.

The Venezuelan government claimed the United States and its Drug Enforcement Administration (DEA) were responsible for the operation and had support from Colombia. Goudreau claimed that Guaidó and two political advisers had signed a contract with him for $213 million in October 2019.

US federal authorities opened an investigation on Goudreau for arms trafficking. On 8 May 2020, Venezuelan Attorney General Tarek William Saab requested the extradition of Goudreau from the United States, in addition to Venezuelan opposition politicians Juan José Rendon and Sergio Vergara, for the "design, financing, and execution" of the plan to overthrow Maduro. He was arrested, released on bond, and disappeared. He is wanted by the FBI for Failure to Appear (Conspiracy to Violate the Arms Export Control Act; Smuggling; Arms Export Control Act Violation; Export Control Reform Act Violation; Violation of the National Firearms Act; Unlawful Possession of a Machine Gun).

== Awards and decorations ==
Sergeant First Class Goudreau's decorations, medals and badges include:

Badge	Combat Infantryman Badge
Badge	Parachutist Badge
1st row	Bronze Star Medal, third award with two oak leaf clusters (Army)
Tabs	Special Forces Tab and Ranger tab
