= Sergio Vergara (politician) =

Venezuelan politician

Sergio de Jesús Vergara González (born 4 September 1973) is a Venezuelan lawyer and politician who serves as a deputy to the National Assembly for Circuit 5 of Táchira state for the Democratic Unity Roundtable (MUD), elected in the 2015 parliamentary elections. He has been the elected regional coordinator of the Popular Will party in Táchira.

== Education ==
Vergara was born in Cabimas, Zulia state, and moved to San Cristóbal, Táchira, in 1990, where he studied law at Universidad Católica del Táchira. Subsequently, he developed as an entrepreneur, and enrolled in a master's degree in public management at the Institute of Advanced Studies in Administration (IESA).

== Career ==
Since the 2007 shutdown of television channel RCTV, he became involved in politics, hand in hand with Daniel Ceballos and Leopoldo López, and in 2009 he participated in the creation of the Popular Will political party, of which he was elected by vote in 2011 as regional coordinator of the party in Táchira.

He later worked as general director of the mayor's office of San Cristóbal alongside mayor Daniel Ceballos, who due to his arrest on March 18, 2014, was acting mayor until his sentencing.

=== National Assembly ===
Vergara has lived most of his life in Táchira, where his family and professional interests are. He participated in the opposition primaries on 17 May 2015 as alternate candidate to the National Assembly for the San Cristobal Circuit, and subsequently assumed the main candidacy held by Daniel Ceballos, after the Supreme Tribunal of Justice disqualified him politically.

On 6 December 2015 he is elected with 75.82% (118,538 votes) being one of the deputies with the highest number of votes in the election according to official data from the National Electoral Council.He took office between 2016 and 2021.
