= J. J. Rendón =

Venezuelan political consultant and activist

Juan José Rendón
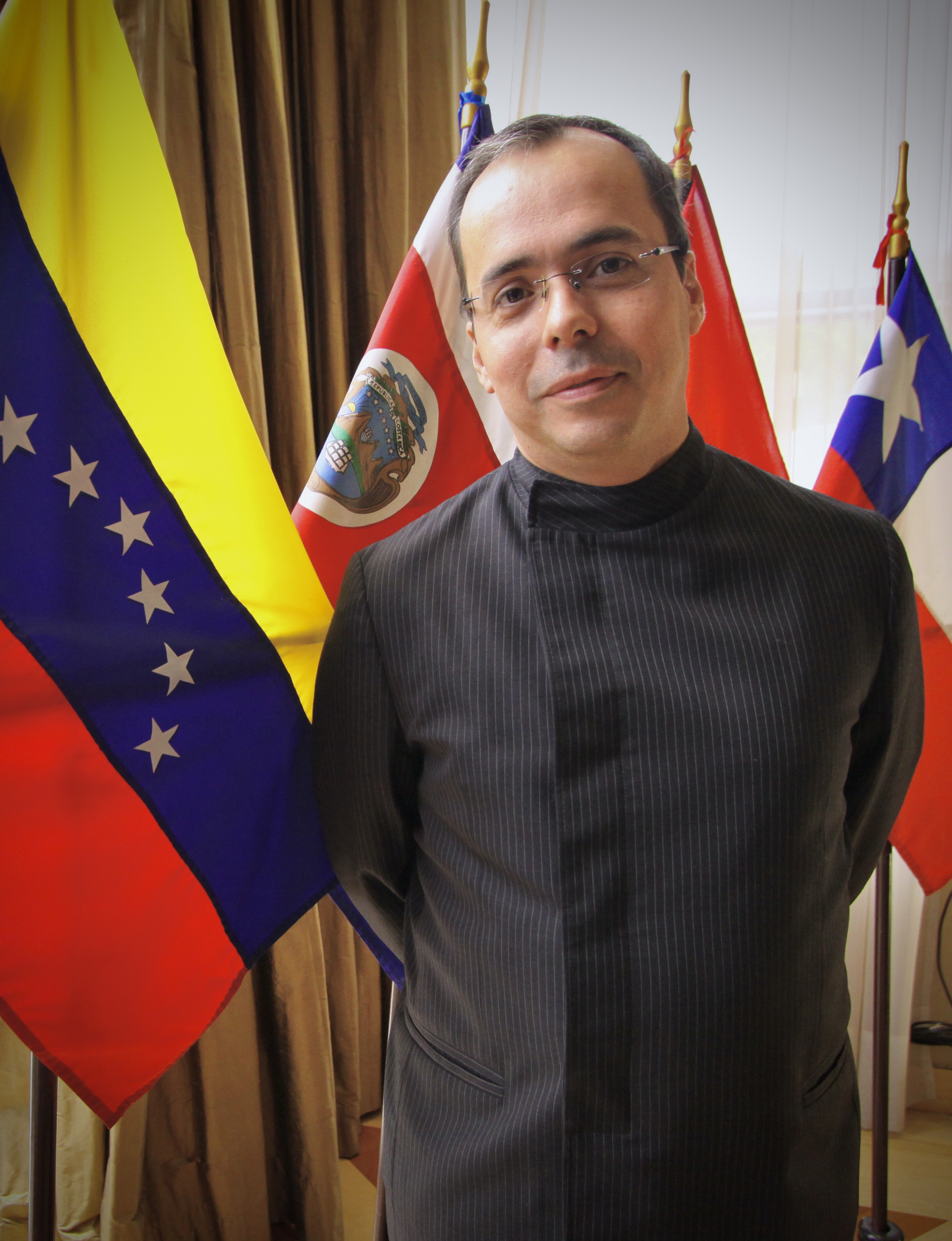
- Rendón in 2011
- Born: 27 January 1964 (age 62); Caracas, Venezuela
- Other name: J.J. Rendón
- Education: Central University of Venezuela and Andrés Bello Catholic University
- Occupation: Political strategist
- Years active: 1987-present
- Employer: JJ Rendon y Asociados Creatividad Estrategica
- Organization: La Causa es Venezuela
- Known for: Political consulting, electoral campaigns and activism
- Movement: The Power of One (El Poder de Uno)
- Website: jjrendon.com

Juan José Rendón Delgado (born 27 January 1964), known professionally as J. J. Rendón, is a Venezuelan political consultant, psychologist, and political activist.

Rendón has been credited for the successful presidential campaigns of Juan Manuel Santos (first elected in 2010 and reelected in 2014), Porfirio Lobo Sosa (2010), and Enrique Peña Nieto (2012).

Rendón was appointed in 2019 by contested Venezuelan acting president Juan Guaidó to lead the Strategy Committee to search new options to overthrow Nicolás Maduro, until his resignation on 11 May 2020.

He specializes in crisis resolution and is a human rights activist. He is a political asylee in the United States.

== Early life and education ==
J. J. Rendón was born in 1964 in Caracas, Venezuela, in the Military hospital of San Juan parish. His father, Juan José Rendón González is a retired military officer. His mother, Zoraida Delgado, was one of the first militants of her parish registered in the Acción Democrática party, which promoted and helped end the dictatorship of Marcos Pérez Jiménez in 1958. She was also executive secretary of the founder of OPEC, the Venezuelan Juan Pablo Pérez Alfonso. He has a sister, Jehanny Rendón Delgado.

Before starting his career in an advertising agency in his early 20s, Rendón studied psychology at Andrés Bello Catholic University and Central University of Venezuela.

== Political activism ==
=== 1990s ===
At the age of 24, Rendón volunteered for Carlos Andrés Pérez's second presidential run, where he met and assisted the American political consultant Joseph Napolitan. He became the creator of a campaign to stimulate the youth vote through a movement known as "La Venezuela 2000", which was transcendental for the presidential triumph.

Rendón founded an advertising company, Chiripa Publicidad, in Caracas, Venezuela. One of his first clients was the former Venezuelan president Rafael Caldera (1916–2009), who was re-elected for a second term in 1993. That year, he was hired as creative vice-president of the agency "Chiripa publicidad" which managed the presidential campaign of the then candidate Rafael Caldera, known as the "chiripero" campaign, in allusion to the new party formed by Caldera, Convergencia. The party was nourished by independents and dissidents (chiripas) of the two big traditional political parties, Acción Democrática and Copei.

=== 2000s ===
==== PRI ====
In the early 2000s, Rendón worked with various political organisations, such as the Mexican Institutional Revolutionary Party (PRI) and Social Party of National Unity. In 2000, his career became international. In August of the same year, one month after the defeat of the Institutional Revolutionary Party (PRI), which for 71 years had won all the presidential elections, he traveled to Mexico and became the party's strategist, taking charge of most of its campaigns throughout the country. For more than a decade he was in charge of the campaigns of governors, mayors, congressmen, and presidential candidates. In 2001 he ran a campaign that overcame negative indicators in the gubernatorial election held in Tabasco, and in the campaigns of Sinaloa and Veracruz, also with wins.

==== 2004 Hipólito Mejía re-election campaign ====
Rendón served as an advisor for Hipólito Mejía's 2004 Dominican Republic presidential re-election campaign. Mejía, who had served as president from 2000 to 2004, was decisively defeated by former president Leonel Fernández. The election took place on May 16, 2004, with Fernández winning decisively and returning to the presidency.

==== 2005 Álvaro Uribe re-election campaign ====
In 2005, he advised the founding process of the New Alliance Party. That same year, 2005, he was in charge of developing the launching campaign of the National Unity Party, the Partido de la U, which emerged as a movement to support the reelection of Álvaro Uribe in 2006. The campaign challenged the traditional way of doing propaganda and advertising in Colombia. Uribe won reelection with a new party that broke 156 years of bipartisanship.

When Juan Manuel Santos was appointed Minister of Defense in Colombia during the presidency of Álvaro Uribe Vélez in 2006, J.J. Rendón became the ministry's chief strategist. During this time, there were notable military operations to rescue FARC hostages, including Operation Jaque on July 2, 2008, which resulted in the rescue of presidential candidate Ingrid Betancourt, two U.S. contractors, and several police and army officers held by the guerrillas for more than six years.

=== 2010s ===
In March 2016, Andrés Sepúlveda, who was serving 10 years in prison for charges such as use of malicious software, conspiracy to commit crime, violation of personal data, and espionage, claimed that most of his work in the past eight years had been on the payroll of Rendón. Sepúlveda provided Bloomberg Businessweek with what he said were e-mails showing conversations between him, Rendón, and Rendón's consulting firm concerning hacking and the progress of campaign-related cyber attacks. Rendón denied using Sepúlveda for anything illegal, and disputed Sepúlveda's account of their relationship. Rendón filed a lawsuit against Bloomberg Businessweek and the journalists who signed the report, both in the United States and in Colombia, because of the story they ran.

==== 2010 Juan Manuel Santos presidential campaign ====
Rendón, the lead strategist of the presidential campaign of Juan Manuel Santos in Colombia, helped turn a close presidential race in Colombia into a landslide victory for Juan Manuel Santos against the Green Party candidate Antanas Mockus. Santos was elected in a campaign that in just 35 days reversed the negative trend he had been running.

==== 2010 Porfirio Lobo Sosa presidential campaign ====
Honduran politician and agricultural landowner Porfirio Lobo Sosa, known as Pepe Lobo, was elected president of Honduras in 2010, with Rendón as his political advisor. Rendón was also consultant to Honduran politician Juan Orlando Hernández during his successful presidential campaign in 2012.

==== 2012 Enrique Peña Nieto presidential campaign ====
In 2012, Enrique Peña Nieto was elected 57th President of Mexico. Rendón was his political advisor.

==== 2014 Juan Manuel Santos re-election campaign ====
Rendón joined Juan Manuel Santos for his re-election campaign in Colombia. In May 2014, Javier Antonio Calle Sernaby, leader of the Colombian drug cartel Los Rastrojos, alleged that he paid Rendón $12 million to help him negotiate favourable terms of surrender and avoid extradition to the US. Rendón denied receiving the money, but stepped down as campaign chief in the election's final stretch. Santos beat his opponent by six percent in a run-off election in June 2014, securing his second four-year term as Colombia's president.

The Prosecutor's Office ruled that the allegations against Rendón were not in accordance with the evidence presented and that no such money had existed, and the case closed.

==== 2013 Henrique Capriles Radonski presidential campaign ====
Rendón was the main strategist for the Venezuelan presidential candidate Henrique Capriles. Official results gave Nicolas Maduro—who had assumed the role of acting president since Chávez's death—a narrow victory over Capriles. Capriles claimed that electoral fraud had taken place on April 14, 2013, in the special election where Maduro was elected president. Capriles provided evidence of the alleged fraud and refused "to accept the vote-tally unless the electoral authority agrees to open all the ballot boxes and count the paper ballots". The authorities refused this methodology claiming it was not foreseen in the law.

== Political career ==
In August 2019, Juan Guaidó tasked Rendón with a "Strategic Committee" to investigate scenarios for achieving the removal of Maduro from office.

=== Macuto Bay raid ===
Members of the Strategic Committee argued that the Venezuelan Constitution, the United Nations Convention against Transnational Organized Crime, and other treaties justified action against Maduro.

On May 4, 2020, Rendón and Congressman Sergio Vergara, another member of the presidential committee to address the Venezuelan crisis, were accused by the regime of Nicolás Maduro of being linked to a maritime incursion known as "El macutazo" in which Venezuelan military and civilian dissidents, together with a contractor and former U.S. military member of the Silvercorp company, attempted to overthrow the Venezuelan dictatorship. Rendón denied the accusations, resigned from the strategy committee, and gave a series of interviews to media and portals around the world to inform that although there was a service agreement with Silvercorp, it had been canceled months before the incursion, something that the contractor himself confirmed in a public interview.

On 8 May 2020, Venezuelan Attorney General Tarek William Saab requested the extradition of Rendón from the United States, along with Silvercorp USA founder Jordan Goudreau and exiled Venezuelan lawmaker Sergio Vergara, for the "design, financing, and execution" of the plan to overthrow Maduro.

== Public perception ==
Rendón gained international attention for his activism against what he regards as neo-totalitarian regimes. He is a self-declared enemy of socialism of the 21st century and supports presidential and governor candidates running in opposition to its policies.

Since 2004, Rendón has claimed that the Venezuelan government has committed fraud in the presidential elections. On December 6, 2015, having won 19 elections in 15 years, the Venezuelan government recognised that the Venezuelan opposition had won 112 seats in the National Assembly. However, president Nicolás Maduro and lead strategist of the Venezuelan government Jorge Rodríguez, claimed on national television that the Democratic Unity coalition (Venezuelan opposition party, MUD) had won it because of the "economic and psychological war" allegedly led by Rendón and other opponents.

Rendón was faced with strong opposition from various Chávez-funded media outlets, centered on his work ethic and strategy tactics.

JJ Rendón was accused on various social media platforms of being behind the "historical fantasy" of the rescue by the Colombian government (former president Álvaro Uribe Vélez) of Emmanuel (a child that was captured and held hostage) and that the child was living in Bogotá, which ended up being true. Soon after, it was proven via DNA testing that the child was Emmanuel. Venezuelan Foreign Minister Nicolás Maduro questioned the results of the DNA testing, stating that Colombia did not allow Venezuelan specialists to conduct their own tests and had created a "cloak of doubt". However, in January 2008, FARC rebels released a communiqué in which they admitted that Emmanuel "is the same three-year-old who was living in foster care in Bogotá, Colombia, who was due to be part of hostage deal." The child was the son of Clara Rojas, Ingrid Betancourt's presidential running mate, both kidnapped by FARC rebels. The child was born in captivity during the kidnapping. In this case, then-Venezuelan President Hugo Chávez Frías and Senator Piedad Córdova were intermediaries with the FARC. They insisted that they would free the child Emmanuel and the rest of the hostages. But the rescue was finally made with the help of the military forces.

His position with regards to these governments, especially the Venezuelan government, has drawn strong reactions from socialism of the 21st century, Hugo Chávez, and supporters of communism and socialism in general. On many occasions, Rendón has faced strong opposition from Venezuelan senior officials, including president Nicolás Maduro, who declared in July 2012 that Rendón was "the number one public enemy of the Venezuelan state".

In 2012, he was named one of the most prominent Latin American consultants by the U.S.-based publication Campaigns & Elections.

In 2013, then-Venezuelan president Nicolás Maduro declared that Rendón was a "stateless" person after accusing him of being linked to an audio recording "widely circulated on social media purporting to be the late Venezuelan leader saying that he's still alive". The Venezuelan government denied him the right to a nationality, Despite being born in Venezuela, Rendón cannot obtain a Venezuelan passport as of 2016. He has claimed to be subjected to several other human rights violations and political persecution.

Rendón started The Power of One seminar series in 2013, offering practical strategies for political activists who are working to oppose regimes that Rendón describes as "neo-totalitarian". He outlined the framework in a 2014 TEDxMidAtlantic talk titled "The New Face of Dictatorship, and How We Can Stop It." Rendón opposes what he terms "socialism of the 21st century" and has publicly criticized the governments of Cuba, Venezuela, and Nicaragua.

In 2014, President Mauricio Funes of El Salvador accused Rendón of conducting dirty war campaigns throughout Latin America. Rendón sued Funes for defamation in Florida, but the court ruled that Funes could not be sued for his official acts.

The lead strategist of the Maduro government, Jorge Rodríguez, has repeatedly insinuated that J.J. Rendón is the main strategist of the Venezuelan opposition, calling him a "psychopath" on government-funded media outlets, including the public channel VTV (Venezuelan Television Corporation) and TeleSUR, a Caracas-based television network funded by the governments of Venezuela, Cuba, and Nicaragua.

Rendon was inducted into the Hall of Fame of Political Consulting by Reed Latino. In 2016, ABC Internacional, a newspaper of record based in Madrid, named him one of "The 10 Most Important Political Consultants in the World" along with James Carville, Karl Rove, and Mary Matalin.

In an interview with Jaime Bayly in January 2016, Rendón claimed that he had been a victim of political persecution and the victim of more than 140 attacks by the Venezuelan government.

== Arrest warrant ==
Allegations were brought forward in November 2013 by Venezuelan prosecutor Luisa Ortega Díaz who requested Interpol detain Rendón and extradite him to Venezuela under charges of assault. Rendón denied these claims and asserted that Venezuela could not legally ask for his arrest without a warrant being present. Despite the allegations, no such warrant was placed on Interpol's wanted persons list, and the claims were dismissed.

== Personal life ==
In May 2016, Rendón received political asylum from the United States government. Rendón was a lecturer for the Higher Program in Strategy and Political Communication at the Institute of Political Communication in Miami during 2014.

Rendón is the founder of the consulting firm J.J Rendón y Asociados Creatividad y Estrategia, Inc., and Get Real Films, the latter of which produced the documentary Here comes the Wolf. He is also a partner of V-me, the first Spanish broadcast television network in association with public television stations.

== Achievements ==
In 2014, Rendón was nominated as Political Consultant of the Year by Victory Awards.

Year	University	Recognition
2016	Cambridge Graduate University	Honorary PhD in Political Science

Year	Nominee / work	Award	Result
2015	Democracy and Human Rights (United Nations)	The Humanitarian Innovation Forum	Won
2015	Truth and Freedom Medal	VI Cumbre Mundial de Comunicación Política	Won
2012	Hall of Fame of Political Consulting	Victory Awards	Won
2003	Special Annual Prize for New Techniques in Political Communication	ALACOP	Won
