= Cartel of the Suns =

Term used to describe state-embedded drug trafficking in Venezuela

- Cartel de los Soles
- The group's name comes from the "sun" insignia of Venezuelan generals.
- Years active: 1993−present
- Territory: Venezuela
- Leaders: Nicolás Maduro (captured, allegedly); Delcy Rodríguez (co-ringleader, allegedly); Jorge Rodríguez (co-ringleader, allegedly); Diosdado Cabello (head of operations, allegedly); Hugo Carvajal (convicted); Tareck El Aissami (convicted)
- Activities: Drug trafficking, narcoterrorism, smuggling, illegal mining and money laundering
- Allies: Venezuela (allegedly); Cuba (allegedly); Nicaragua (allegedly); Tren de Aragua (allegedly); Mexican drug cartels (allegedly); FARC (allegedly, until 2016); FARC dissidents (allegedly); Hezbollah (allegedly); ELN (allegedly)

Cartel of the Suns (Spanish: Cartel de los Soles, Spanish pronunciation: [kaɾˈtel de los ˈsoles]) is an umbrella term used to describe an alleged loose drug trafficking network or networks of cells also participating in other related criminal activity including illegal mining and smuggling of sanctioned resources and laundering of illicit profits involving members of the Bolivarian Venezuelan Government, the Armed Forces and Intelligence Service, including high-ranking officers and political officials. Experts studying the drug trade do not use the term to refer to a single hierarchical organization or a literal drug cartel, but as journalistic shorthand for an informal system of corruption by which military and political officials profit by working with drug traffickers.

The term Cartel of the Suns was first used in 1993 as a journalistic label following a political scandal involving Venezuelan military officials who were implicated in a CIA plot to smuggle cocaine into the United States in order to infiltrate Colombian cartels. The term was inspired by the "soles" (sun emblems) on Venezuelan generals' uniforms. Apart from drug trafficking, members of the Venezuelan Armed Forces have also been linked to illegal mining, money laundering, and smuggling raw materials such as oil, or gold.

While multiple incidents of Venezuelan Armed Forces members or Bolivarian Republic officials participating in drug trafficking have been documented, the US allegation that the Cartel of the Suns constitutes a formal organization or organized network led by Venezuelan president Nicolás Maduro has generally been rejected by independent experts as unsubstantiated. The subsequent designation of Cartel of the Suns as a Foreign Terrorist Organization was criticized as providing a potential legal rationale for regime change in Venezuela, coinciding with a significant US military buildup in the region.

After Maduro's capture by the United States in January 2026 (Operation Absolute Resolve), the US Department of Justice issued a revised indictment against him that abandoned the characterization of the Cartel de los Soles as a formal organization and instead described his oversight of a "patronage system" and "culture of corruption" funded by drug trafficking. US secretary of state Marco Rubio continued to refer to the Cartel of the Suns as a drug cartel.

== History ==
In 1993, the term Cartel de los Soles or "Cartel of the Suns" was first used when two National Guard generals of the Anti-Drug National Command, Ramón Guillén Dávila and Orlando Hernández Villegas, were investigated for alleged drug trafficking crimes. It was discovered that Guillén approved a cocaine shipment from Venezuela to the United States, following demands from undercover CIA agents, which sought to infiltrate Colombian gangs trafficking cocaine into the United States. Thor Halvorssen, the anti-drug commissioner in Venezuela, defended Guillén's innocence regarding the cocaine shipment.

Reports that members of the Venezuelan military were involved in drug trafficking emerged in 1998, though they were limited to the taking of payments and ignoring drug traffickers. It was alleged that officers of Hugo Chávez's Revolutionary Bolivarian Movement-200 who planned the 1992 Venezuelan coup d'état attempts had created a group that participated in drug trafficking known as the Cartel Bolivariano or Bolivarian Cartel. Following the 1992 coup attempts, the Los Angeles Times noted that Venezuelan officers may have sought to take over the government, since there was "money to be made from corruption, particularly in drugs". According to Héctor Landaeta, a journalist and author of Chavismo, Narco-trafficking and the Military, the phenomenon began when Colombian drugs began to enter into Venezuela from corrupt border units and the "rot moved its way up the ranks".

=== Bolivarian government ===
The "Cartel of the Suns" name returned in 2004, when it was used by reporter and city council member Mauro Marcano to describe corruption in the Venezuelan government. Shortly before he was murdered, Marcano alleged that Alexis Maneiro, head of the National Guard and the National Directorate of Intelligence and Prevention Services, was involved in drug trafficking.

According to Vice News, the Venezuelan government under Chávez expanded corruption to "unprecedented levels" in an already corrupt military. Chávez gave military officials millions of dollars for social programs that allegedly disappeared, while also giving legal immunity to drug trafficking officials to maintain power and loyalty. In 2005, Chávez expelled the US Drug Enforcement Administration from Venezuela, accusing it of espionage. Chávez claimed that his administration's efforts against drug trafficking became more effective without US involvement as drug seizures increased by 80% that year. However, they declined in later years. According to Colombian intelligence, an arrested drug vigilante stated that "senior figures in President Hugo Chávez's security forces arranged drug shipments through Venezuela". It has been alleged that the National Guard also worked with the Revolutionary Armed Forces of Colombia (FARC) to facilitate the drug trade. British officials alleged that planes from Colombia involved in trafficking drugs would be sheltered by Venezuelan Air Force bases.

In September 2013, an incident allegedly linked to the Cartel of the Suns and involving men from the Venezuelan National Guard occurred, when 31 suitcases containing 1.3 tons of cocaine were discovered on an Air France flight. The incident "astonished" Charles de Gaulle Airport authorities, as it was the largest seizure of cocaine recorded in mainland France. On 15 February 2014, a commander of the Venezuelan National Guard was arrested while driving to Valencia with his family with 554 kilos of cocaine in his possession.

On 11 November 2015, DEA agents in Haiti arrested two relatives (an adopted son and nephew) of Cilia Flores, the first lady of Venezuela, as they attempted to move 800 kilos of cocaine from Venezuela to the United States. A source from the DEA unofficially stated that the shipment was allowed to pass through Venezuela due to government corruption. According to Robert E. Looney, the shipment might have been made possible by the help of corrupt members of the Venezuelan Presidential Honor Guard.

=== Designation as a terrorist organization ===
In March 2020, the US Department of Justice indicted Maduro and 14 other Venezuelan officials on charges of narco-terrorism, conspiracy to import cocaine, and drug trafficking. The indictment alleged that, since at least 1999, they acted as leaders and managers of the Cartel of the Suns. The indictment also alleged that Maduro coordinated with the FARC, negotiating multi-ton cocaine shipments and providing weapons to the Colombian guerrilla group. Two of the indicted officials have since pleaded guilty in US federal courts. In June 2023, retired General Clíver Alcalá Cordones pleaded guilty to providing material support and firearms to the FARC; he was sentenced to 21 years and 6 months in prison in April 2024. In June 2025, former military intelligence director Hugo Carvajal (who had been extradited from Spain in 2023) pleaded guilty to all four charges including narco-terrorism and conspiracy to import cocaine.

In July 2025, the US Treasury Department designated the Cartel of the Suns as a Specially Designated Global Terrorist. On 16 November 2025, the US Department of State designated them as a Foreign Terrorist Organization, alleging they were "responsible for terrorist violence throughout our hemisphere as well as for trafficking drugs into the United States and Europe", calling them "narco-terrorists", and stating that the Maduro regime is "illegitimate" and that "neither Maduro nor his cronies represent Venezuela's legitimate government". The designation took effect on 24 November 2025.

Following the US SDGT designation, several Latin American governments issued similar declarations. As of November 2025, Argentina, the Dominican Republic, Ecuador, Paraguay and Peru have also designated the Cartel of the Suns as a terrorist organization. Other regional leaders have disputed the US allegations. Mexican president Claudia Sheinbaum, when asked about the US allegations at a press conference, answered that it was the first time she had heard of such accusations and requested the US produce supporting evidence. Colombian president Gustavo Petro denounced US actions, dismissing the Department of Justice's allegations as a fabricated pretext to force regime change. He maintained that " "It is the fictional excuse of the far right to bring down governments that do not obey them." The Colombian Senate subsequently defied Petro, voting 33 to 20 to declare the Cartel of the Suns a transnational criminal and terrorist organization.

The main source of drugs in the US is the synthetic opioid fentanyl from Mexico and cocaine from Colombia; Venezuela does not produce or ship fentanyl. While it is a transit country for Colombian cocaine, it is estimated that 400 tones of cocaine transit through it yearly, most of it destined for Europe, while about 2660 tones of cocaine are produced on annual basis in Colombia. However, according to former US officials, Venezuela is unique because of "the degree of state control and involvement in the drugs trade."

In August 2025, the United States deployed 4,500 troops and several Navy warships to the southern Caribbean as part of a major counter-narcotics operation aimed at disrupting drug trafficking networks, including groups such as Cartel of the Suns. Effective November 24 2025, the Department of State of the Trump Administration escalated its targeting of the Cartel of the Suns by designating it as a Foreign Terrorist Organization (FTO) headed by Nicolás Maduro. The move received criticism from experts who do not consider it an actual drug organization led by Maduro and was described as providing a legal rationale for possible military action and regime change in Venezuela.

After the United States launched strikes to capture Maduro in January 2026 and bring him to the United States to face charges related to alleged drug trafficking, the new indictment did not refer to the Cartel of the Suns as a group, instead referring to Maduro's position atop a drug-trafficking backed "patronage system" and "culture of corruption".

== Organization ==
The Cartel of the Suns allegedly operates through multiple branches of the Armed Forces of Venezuela, including the Venezuelan Army, Venezuelan Navy, Venezuelan Air Force, and Venezuelan National Guard, encompassing the lowest to the highest levels of personnel. InSight Crime describes it not as a hierarchical organization, but as "loose network of cells" within the Armed Forces of Venezuela which "operate essentially as drug trafficking organizations." In the Routledge Handbook of Caribbean Economies, Robert E. Looney describes the Cartel of the Suns as a "loose assembly of high-ranking retired military men", and argues that it "is not responsible for producing drugs, setting prices, or restricting competition; instead, it is responsible for the transport of shipments though Venezuela to key hubs in Honduras, the Dominican Republic, Suriname and Europe via Africa".

=== Low-level personnel ===
Allegedly, lower ranking National Guardsmen compete for positions at border checkpoints so they can be paid bribes for "illicit trade", though a large portion of bribes go to their superiors. According to these allegations, corrupt officials then traffic drugs from Colombia to Venezuela where they are shipped internationally.

=== High-level officials ===
The "Corrupt Venezuelan Regime" according to the United States Department of Justice (2020)

==== Nicolás Maduro ====
President of Venezuela Nicolás Maduro has personally promoted individuals accused of drug trafficking to high positions in the Venezuelan government. In May 2018, he was alleged to have received drug trafficking profits from Diosdado Cabello by the US Office of Foreign Assets Control. After Maduro was inaugurated for a third term on 10 January 2025, the US State Department under the Biden administration increased their bounty on Maduro from $15 million to $25 million. The bounty was doubled to $50 million on 7 August 2025, under the Trump Administration.

On 3 January 2026, Maduro was captured during the 2026 United States strikes in Venezuela by US forces and flown to the United States, where he faced charges in the Southern District of New York. He is accused of being the leader of the Cartel of the Suns and "using cocaine to deliberately flood America with drugs" as part of its activity. The New York prosecutors accused Maduro of having personally worked and participated in drug trafficking activities with the Mexican Sinaloa, Zeta, and Tren de Aragua cartels. The new indictment did not refer to the Cartel of the Suns as a formal group, instead referring to Maduro's position atop a corrupt, drug-trafficking backed patronage system.

==== Delcy Rodríguez and Jorge Rodríguez ====
In December 2025, former Venezuelan General Clíver Alcalá Cordones claimed that Venezuelan Vice President Delcy Rodríguez and her brother, Jorge Rodríguez, were the true heads of the Cartel of the Suns, and not Nicolás Maduro, with the Venezuelan President himself allegedly being just a figurehead. This claim reportedly echoed U.S. intelligence assessments that power shifted away from Maduro toward a disciplined, family-run network that operate largely out of sight.

==== Diosdado Cabello ====
In January 2015, Leamsy Salazar, the former security chief of both Chávez and Diosdado Cabello, accused Cabello of being the head of the Cartel of the Suns. Salazar was placed in witness protection, fleeing to the United States with assistance of the Drug Enforcement Administration's Special Operations Division after cooperating with the administration and providing details on Cabello's possible involvement with international drug trade. Specifically, Salazar stated that he witnessed Cabello giving orders to transport tons of cocaine out of Venezuela. These shipments of drugs were reportedly sent via the FARC in Colombia to the United States and Europe, with the possible assistance of Cuba. The alleged international drug operation was said to involve other senior members of Venezuela's government as well, including Tarek El Aissami and José David Cabello, Diosdado's brother.

On 18 May 2018, the Office of Foreign Assets Control (OFAC) of the US Department of the Treasury placed sanctions against Cabello, his wife, his brother, and his testaferro (frontman) Rafael Sarria. OFAC stated that Cabello and others used their power within the Bolivarian government "to personally profit from extortion, money laundering, and embezzlement", with Cabello allegedly coordinating drug trafficking activities with the Vice President of Venezuela, Tareck El Aissami, and dividing profits with President Nicolás Maduro. OFAC also alleged that Cabello would use public information to track wealthy individuals who were involved in trafficking, then steal their drugs and property in order to eliminate competition.

==== Henry Rangel Silva ====
In 2008, OFAC sanctioned the general Henry Rangel Silva and other two current or former Venezuelan government officials, saying there was evidence they had materially helped the FARC in the illegal drug trade. The order "freezes any assets the designated entities and individuals may have under US jurisdiction and prohibits US persons from conducting financial or commercial transactions involving those assets". Other officials sanctioned were General Hugo Carvajal, former director of Venezuela's military intelligence (DGIM), and Captain of Navy Ramón Rodríguez Chacín, the former Minister of the Interior. In November 2010, Rangel Silva declared that the military forces are "married to the political, socialist project" led by Chávez in Venezuela. In the 2012 Venezuelan regional elections, Rangel Silva was elected governor of Trujillo state by 82.30% of the vote. He was re-elected in the 2017 Venezuelan regional elections by 59.75% of the vote.

==== Tareck El Aissami ====
Tareck El Aissami was sanctioned by the US Treasury Department on 13 February 2017 under the Foreign Narcotics Kingpin Designation Act, after being accused of facilitating drug shipments from Venezuela to Mexico and the United States. The order froze tens of millions of dollars of assets purportedly under his control.

==== Néstor Reverol ====
Néstor Reverol, head of the Bolivarian National Guard, was indicted by the United States government in August 2016 for assisting drug trafficking in Venezuela. Reverol allegedly tipped off traffickers, cancelled investigations and released those involved in drug shipments.

==== Hugo Carvajal ====
Hugo Carvajal is another alleged leader of the Cartel of the Suns. On 22 July 2014, Carvajal, the former head of Venezuelan military-intelligence, was detained in Aruba, despite having been admitted on a diplomatic passport and being named consul general to Aruba in January. The arrest was carried out following a formal request by the US government, which accuses Carvajal of ties to drug trafficking and the FARC guerrilla group. On 27 July 2014, Carvajal was released after authorities decided he had diplomatic immunity but was subsequently considered persona non grata. In July 2023, Carvajal was arrested in Spain and extradited to the US, where in June 2025 he pleaded guilty to four charges, including narco-terrorism and conspiracy to import cocaine.

==== Yazenky Lamas ====
Yazenky Lamas, former pilot to First Lady Cilia Flores, was extradited to the United States from Colombia, having allegedly provided air traffic codes, which would allow planes carrying cocaine to impersonate commercial flights. President Maduro reportedly asked Colombian Defense Minister Luis Carlos Villegas Echeverri to reject the request for his extradition. Lamas was linked to hundreds of drug flights operated in Venezuela.

==== Others ====
Other officials have also been implicated in or accused of involvement with drug trafficking, according to InSight Crime's 2018 report "Venezuela: A Mafia State?":

- Clíver Alcalá Cordones
- Freddy Bernal
- José David Cabello
- Amílcar Figueroa
- Bladimir Flores
- Carlos Malpica Flores
- Walter Gavidia Flores
- Darry Fortoul Ochoa
- Eliecer García Torrealba
- Carlos Justiniano Núñez
- Jesús Itriago
- Ramón Madriz
- Rodolfo McTurk
- Pedro Martín Olivares
- Edylberto Molina
- Frank Morgado
- Benny Palmeri-Bacchi
- Rafael Ramírez
- Ramon Rodriguez Chacin

== Allies ==
=== FARC ===
In 2005, all branches of the National Bolivarian Armed Forces of Venezuela were assigned to combat drug trafficking in Venezuela, granting data once held only by the Bolivarian National Guard to the army, navy and air force. Mildred Camero, a former anti-drug official of the Chávez government, said this data created competition within the ranks of the military, who fought to make deals with the FARC to actively partake in drug trafficking.

Authorities in Colombia stated that laptops seized on a raid against Raul Reyes in 2007 contained documents showing Hugo Chávez offered payments of as much as $300 million to the FARC "among other financial and political ties that date back years". The documents also purportedly show that FARC rebels sought Venezuelan assistance in acquiring surface-to-air missiles and that Chávez met personally with FARC rebel leaders. According to Interpol, the files found by Colombian forces were considered to be authentic. In 2008, the United States Department of Treasury accused two senior Venezuelan government officials and one former official of providing material assistance to drug-trafficking operations carried out by the FARC guerrilla group in Colombia.

Independent analyses by some US academics and journalists have challenged the Colombian interpretation of the documents, accusing the Colombian government of exaggerating their contents. In 2008, the Secretary General of the Organization of American States, Jose Miguel Insulza, testified before the US Congress that "there are no evidences" that Venezuela is supporting "terrorist groups", including the FARC. Three years later, in 2011, the International Institute for Strategic Studies (IISS) concluded that Chávez's government funded FARC's Caracas office and granted it access to intelligence services. Venezuelan diplomats denounced the IISS findings, saying that they had "basic inaccuracies". As of 2018, FARC dissidents who left FARC when it disbanded in 2017 still operate within Venezuela with virtual impunity. These dissident forces, with armed personnel numbering up to 2,500 individuals, allegedly still cooperate with the Cartel of the Suns.

=== ELN ===
The Colombian Marxist guerilla National Liberation Army has been accused of working with the Cartel of the Suns. According to InSight Crime, ever since the dissolution of FARC, the ELN has taken over the role as a shipments supplier and operation overseer inside Venezuela, and consolidated control along the Colombian-Venezuela border, becoming a strategic partner for the Venezuelan government. The US government accused Maduro's administration of providing a "permissive environment" for the ELN and its operations. According to CTC Sentinel, the Venezuelan government protects the ELN from Colombian security forces and allows it to conduct financial and recruitment operations within its borders. In exchange, the ELN declared that it will defend Venezuela from foreign intervention.

The organization is present in up to 13 Venezuelan states, employing about 15,000 Venezuelans along the border with Colombia; it has also reportedly taken over illegal mining operations from criminal groups in Venezuela, including the Orinoco Mining Arc. The organization actively recruits impoverished Venezuelans, and has established five radio stations in Venezuela to promote its ideology and attract recruits. It is also alleged to have assumed state functions in some parts of Venezuela, taxing local businesses and residents in the areas it controls, and providing local communities with food supplies, weapons, military training and ideological education. It has been found that ELN distributes food supplies from the Venezuelan Local Committees for Supply and Production in 39 municipalities. It enforces its own rules in Venezuelan territories under its control, reportedly conducting executions for petty crime as well as drug or alcohol consumption.

=== Cuba ===
Cuba has been accused of being a strategic partner of the Cartel of the Suns. Political scientists Juan Antonio Blanco and Emilio Morales argue that Cuba provides financial, logistical and intelligence support to the Cartel of the Suns, granting it international protection and allowing to bypass international sanctions imposed on Venezuela. Cuba reportedly also provides a sanctuary and training to officials and guerillas involved in the Cartel of the Suns. Blanco and Morales also claim that Cuba convinced Chávez that he would be able to remain in power if he subjected Venezuelan armed forces to inspection and monitoring by the Cuban intelligence apparatus. Because of this, Blanco and Morales contend that the Cartel of the Suns represents a "two-headed mafia state". Cuba has been accused to be the "key actor in the construction of the so-called Cartel de los Soles". Cuban government denied the accusations, stating that Cuba is "not a producer of drugs or a drug transit country."

Hugo Carvajal, the former head of the Venezuelan military-intelligence who defected from the Venezuelan government in 2017, contends that top leaders of Maduro's administration operate the Cartel of the Suns "to weaponize drugs against the United States". He claimed that Cuba is the mastermind behind the Cartel of the Suns, reportedly suggesting weaponized drug trafficking to Chávez in the mid-2000s and helping Venezuela organize the Cartel of the Suns. According to the American diplomat Roger Noriega, Cuban military officials such as Luis Alberto Rodríguez López-Calleja, the son-in-law of Raul Castro, are involved in the drug trafficking operations of the Cartel of the Suns. Center for a Free Cuba claimed that "the Cuban regime played a key role in establishing drug trafficking operations in Venezuela", stating that the alliance of Venezuela with FARC and ELN was forged "under Cuba's direction" and that "the Cuban government protects and facilitates certain drug trafficking routes from Venezuelan territory to the United States." The organization alleged that Cuban intelligence as well as diplomats such as the former Cuban ambassador to Venezuela, Germán Sánchez Otero, participate in drug trafficking activities of the Cartel of the Suns.

=== Nicaragua ===
Nicaraguan leaders Daniel Ortega and Rosario Murillo are alleged to have links to the Cartel of the Suns. Nicaragua was alleged to be the part of the "criminal ecosystem" of the Cartel of the Suns by political scientists Juan Antonio Blanco and Emilio Morales. The Security Minister of Costa Rica, Mario Zamora Cordero, stated that the Cartel of the Suns might be present in the Crucitas area in Cutris, a border area where Nicaraguan miners illegally operate. The area has been a place of armed clashes between Nicaraguan miners and the Costa Rican security forces. Donald Trump has claimed that the President of Nicaragua, Daniel Ortega, is a "narco-terrorist". Ortega expressed his solidarity with Venezuela and Maduro, and condemned the military operations of United States against the Venezuelan government.

The Nicaraguan Sandinista leadership has been accused of being involved in the drug trafficking operations of the Cartel of the Suns, making Nicaragua a transit country where cocaine is stored before it can be smuggled north to Mexico and the United States. Roberto Samcam, a former Sandinista official who later became a critic of President Ortega, claimed that the Nicaraguan government has its own drug trafficking network known as the "El Carmen Cartel". Samcam contends that "there is a very close relationship between the Cartel of the Suns and what is known as the El Carmen Cartel", and that "it would be very naive to think that much of the money in Nicaragua doesn't come from the Cartel of the Suns". In 2025, Samcam was assassinated while in exile in Costa Rica. El País attributted the assassination to "Sandinista cells" in Costa Rica, arguing that it is not the first time a Nicaraguan opposition figure was assassinated in Costa Rica - in June 2022, Rodolfo Rojas was assassinated, and in October 2024, Jaime Luis Ortega Chavarría, both critics of the Ortega regime.

=== Hamas and Hezbollah ===
Members of Hamas and Hezbollah are alleged to be involved in Cartel of the Suns. Timothy Shea, former acting Administrator of the Drug Enforcement Administration, and Geoffrey Berman, who served as the United States Attorney for the Southern District of New York, accused Hamas and Hezbollah of participating in weapons-for-cocaine agreements, supplying FARC members and Venezuelan officials with anti-tank rocket launchers, and alleged that the Cartel of the Suns recruited members of both Hamas and Hezbollah "for the purpose of helping to plan and organize attacks against United States interests." Shea and Berman argued that Adel el Zabayar, a PSUV member who presides over the Federation of Arab Associations and Entities of Venezuela (Spanish: Federación de Asociaciones y Entidades Árabes de Venezuela), served as the middleman between the Cartel of the Suns and Middle Eastern militias.

=== Others ===
On 13 January 2026, the federal court in New York sentenced Carlos Orense Azocar, nicknamed "El Gordo", to life imprisonment plus 30 additional years for drug trafficking and weapons-related crimes. The US investigators stated that Azocar as "as one of the oldest operators linked to the so-called Cartel de los Soles", while Miami Herald described the case as "one of the most sweeping narcotics prosecutions ever brought against a figure tied to Venezuela’s shadowy drug networks and alleged corruption at the highest levels of the Caracas regime and its military."

Azocar's drug trafficiking operations were to begin about 2003 and gradually expanded; according to the federal court, using a complex network of air and sea routes, Azocar was to organize transport of cocaine to the United States, with a single shipment ranging from hundreds to thousands of kilograms of cocaine. Azocar was to "operate with near impunity inside Venezuela" thanks to bribing senior officials of the Venezuelan military and intelligence. He was arrested in Italy in 2021 and extradited to the United States in 2022. According to Infobae, apart from Venezuelan officials, Azocar was also cooperating with corrupt Colombian military officials as well as high-ranking executives in the state-owned oil industry in the United States, including a former Citgo Petroleum Corporation executive.

== Nature and dispute over structure ==
Although widespread political corruption in Venezuela and the involvement of high-ranking members of the Venezuelan Armed Forces and Bolivarian regime members in drug trafficking are well documented, whether this involvement constitutes a unified cartel remains a subject of dispute and is viewed by most independent experts as lacking evidence. Use of the label "Cartel of the Suns" has been criticized, with some experts arguing that there is no evidence which would substantiate direct and unified government involvement in drug trafficking.

InSight Crime argued that the US sanctions during the Venezuelan crisis against the "so-called 'Cartel of the Suns' incorrectly portray it as a hierarchical, ideologically driven drug trafficking organisation rather than a profit-based system of generalised corruption involving high-ranking military figures," a view shared by Philip Johnson, who argued that "the charge of central coordination by Maduro is indicative of US efforts to delegitimize the Venezuelan government." According to InSight Crime's 2022 investigative news report, the nature of the Cartel of the Suns changed after 2017, owing to the severe economic and financial crisis in Venezuela, which prevented the state from ensuring due pay to members of the military and law enforcement. Their report further argues that in the mid-2010s, the Cartel of the Suns evolved from a loose network of drug-trafficking groups within the Armed Forces structure into an elaborate system of patronage whose main goal is to distribute and keep the wealth of the drug trade in the hands of strategically placed military and law enforcement officers (both military and civilian), in order to keep them loyal to both the regime and to Maduro personally. According to the same report, the regime's political leaders such as President Nicolás Maduro and ministers Diosdado Cabello, Tareck el Aissami, and Nestor Reverol appear to keep a "safe distance" from the drug operations themselves, while the "opaque" nature of the Bolivarian Venezuela's business and housing registries make it difficult to verify the allegations that such government members use indirect ways to profit from the drug revenues proper. Nevertheless, as the main goal of the system appears to be keeping the Maduro's regime afloat, government members appear to act more as "power brokers" overseeing a complex system of criminal patronage networks rather than directly administering drug-trafficking groups themselves.

Despite claims by the US government in July 2025 of the Cartel of the Suns supporting narco-trafficking groups like Sinaloa Cartel or Tren de Aragua, no mention of the Cartel of the Suns was made by the state department in its March 2025 report on global anti-drug operations. Experts such as Phil Gunson at the International Crisis Group think tank also cast doubt on the label "Cartel of the Suns", arguing that while there is "abundant evidence of links between several Armed Forces commanders and drug trafficking", clear evidence which would demonstrate the central coordination of said drug trafficking by the Venezuelan government has never been presented. Similarly, a 2016 report by the Christian Michelsen Institute stated that while "allegations about involvement in drug trafficking have been widespread," few if any details are known about the structure and scope of control exerted by military officials, noting that the Venezuelan government dismisses claims of official involvement as a "US-orchestrated smear campaign." Their analysis further notes a rise in reports of "corruption involving military officers" which "has grown in scope since Chávez’s death." Writing in 2020 and 2025, Philip Johnson from Flinders University stated that the Cartel of the Suns is not a centrally coordinated cartel within the Venezuelan government but rather a loose and fragmented network of competing drug-trafficking networks within state institutions.

John Polga-Hecimovich of the United States Naval Academy disputed the US accusation that the Cartel of the Suns and Maduro engaged in "narcoterrorism". Polga-Hecimovich argues that although the US Justice Department charged Venezuelan officials of narcoterrorism and related crimes "since at least 1999", it is "not reflected in most prior public US declarations". The United States Southern Command documents referenced "narcoterrorism" 7 times, always in reference to Peru and Colombia. He concludes that "if Maduro were facilitating a “narco-terrorist” government, it seems likely that more posture statements in the past would have mentioned this pressing concern, à la Colombia or Peru."

After the capture of Maduro by the United States in January 2026, the "revised indictment" against him "abandoned the claim that Cartel de los Soles was an actual organization", and instead referred to his position atop a drug-trafficking backed "patronage system" and "culture of corruption". According to The New York Times, the new indictment "appeared to tacitly concede the point" of the experts that Cartel of the Suns does not exist as an organisation but instead serves as an umbrella term for drug-corrupted Venezuelan officials. Nevertheless, Trump administration's officials such as Marco Rubio continued to refer to the Cartel of the Suns as a drug cartel. Elizabeth Dickinson of the International Crisis Group stated that "the new indictment gets it right, but the designations are still far from reality", while Jeremy McDermott of InSight Crime disputed the charge of Maduro's involvement with the Tren de Aragua cartel, arguing that it lacks evidence.

== See also ==
- 2026 United States strikes in Venezuela
- Crime in Venezuela
- Deep state
- Narcosobrinos affair
- Operation Southern Spear
- Susurluk scandal
