= Wilter Neptalí Blanco Ruíz =

Honduran drug trafficker

Wilter Neptalí Blanco Ruíz (alternatively Wilter Blanco-Ruiz) is the former head of the Atlantic Cartel, a Honduras-based drug trafficking organization.

== Head of Atlantic Cartel ==
As the head of the Atlantic Cartel, Blanco is alleged to have corrupted members of the military, police and judiciary of Honduras. In 2009, Blanco reportedly ordered police to assassinate Julián Arístides González Irías, Honduras' top anti-drug czar.

Under his leadership, the Cartel reportedly developed connections to the Cartel of the Suns in Venezuela.

The Atlantic Cartel is reportedly based primarily in the Copán and Ocotepeque departments, in the western parts of Honduras.

== Arrest ==
Blanco was arrested outside of San José, Costa Rica, several weeks after fleeing Honduras following the unsealing of an indictment against him. He was extradited to the United States directly from Costa Rica.

== Prosecution ==
Blanco was indicted by the United States in August 2016, on allegations of importing cocaine to the United States since at least 1999. He pled guilty in July 2017.
