= Casa de los Sueños =

Prison and torture centre in Caracas, Venezuela

The Casa de los Sueños (English: "House of Dreams") is a notorious prison in Caracas, Venezuela. It is located in the headquarters of the General Directorate of Military Counterintelligence (DGCIM).

Those held there include political prisoners and people that DGCIM has designated as suspected foreign agents. It is reported that prisoners there are routinely subjected to torture.

The cells measure 2.5 by 1.9 meters. Each has a concrete sleeping slab, a lavatory, and a small sink. No bedding is provided, so prisoners have to sleep on the slab. Prisoners are denied access to books or writing materials, and are not allowed to communicate with the outside world. Up to four people can be placed in a cell that only has sleeping provision for one person.
