= Hugo Carvajal =

Venezuelan politician and military officer (born 1960)

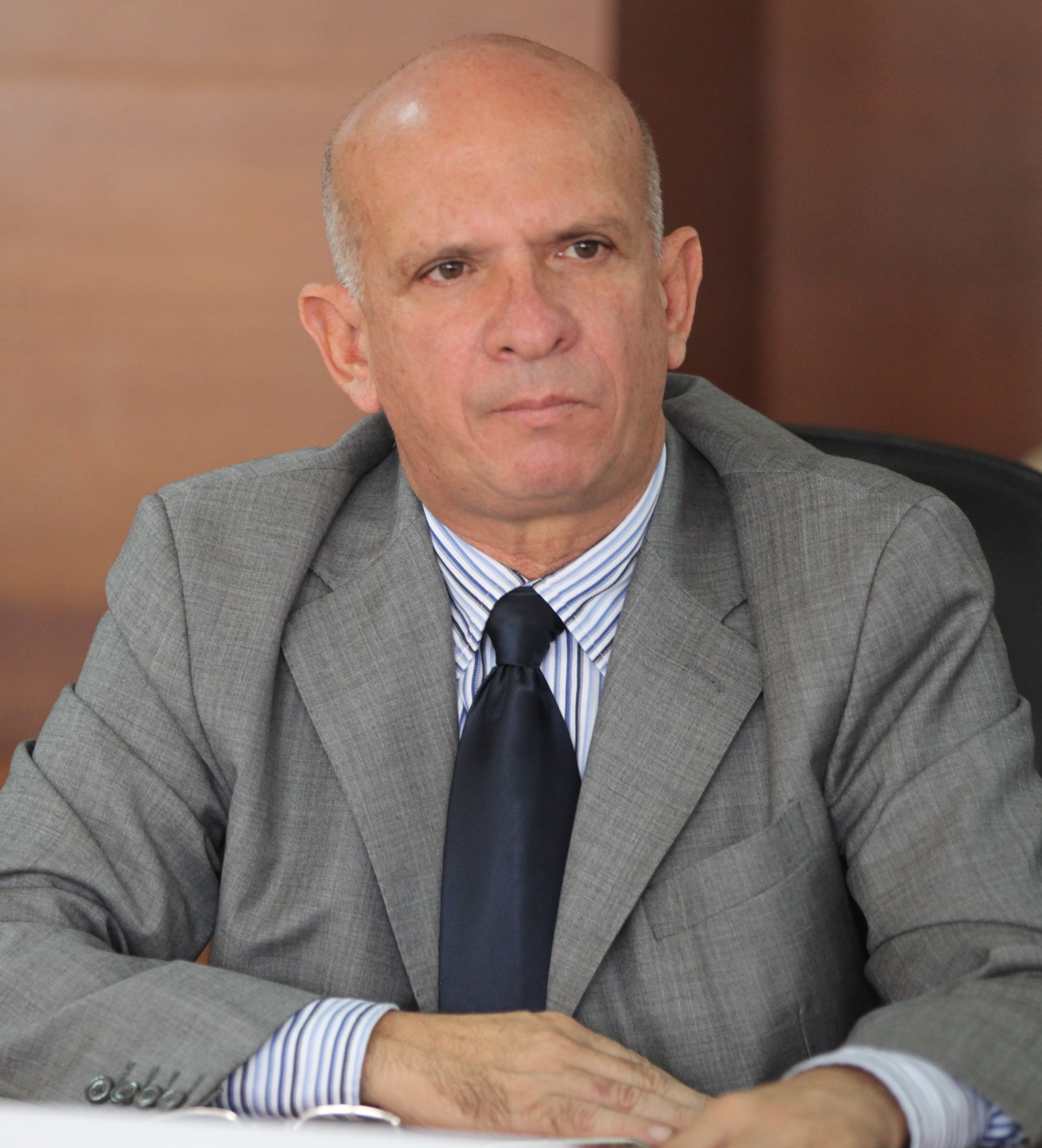
- Carvajal in 2016.

Deputy of the National Assembly for Monagas
- In office 5 January 2016 – March 2019

Consul General of Venezuela in Aruba
- In office January 2014 – April 2014
- President: Nicolás Maduro

Director of the Directorate General of Military Counterintelligence
- In office April 2013 – January 2014
- Preceded by: Wilfredo Figueroa Chacín
- Succeeded by: Iván Hernández Dala
- In office July 2004 – December 2011
- Succeeded by: Wilfredo Figueroa Chacín

Deputy Director of the Directorate General of Military Counterintelligence
- In office 2003–2004

Personal details
- Born: Hugo Armando Carvajal Barrios; 1 April 1960 (age 66) Puerto la Cruz, Anzoátegui, Venezuela
- Party: United Socialist Party of Venezuela (former)
- Children
- Criminal information
- Convictions: Drug Trafficking, Narcoterrorism

Details
- Date apprehended: September 2021
- Imprisoned at: New York Federal Prison
- Nickname: El Pollo ("The Chicken")

Military service
- Rank: General

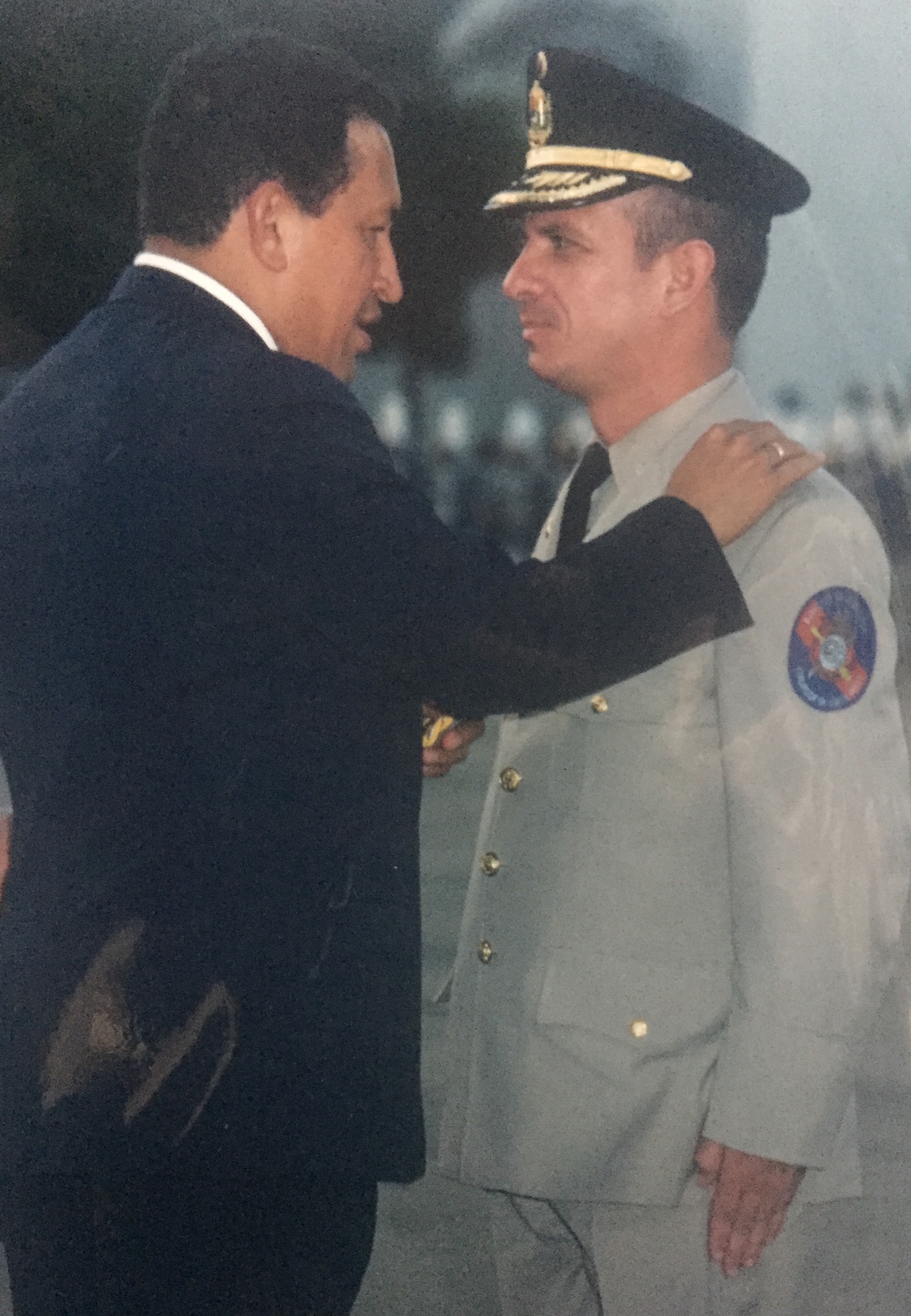
Carvajal as Major General with Hugo Chávez

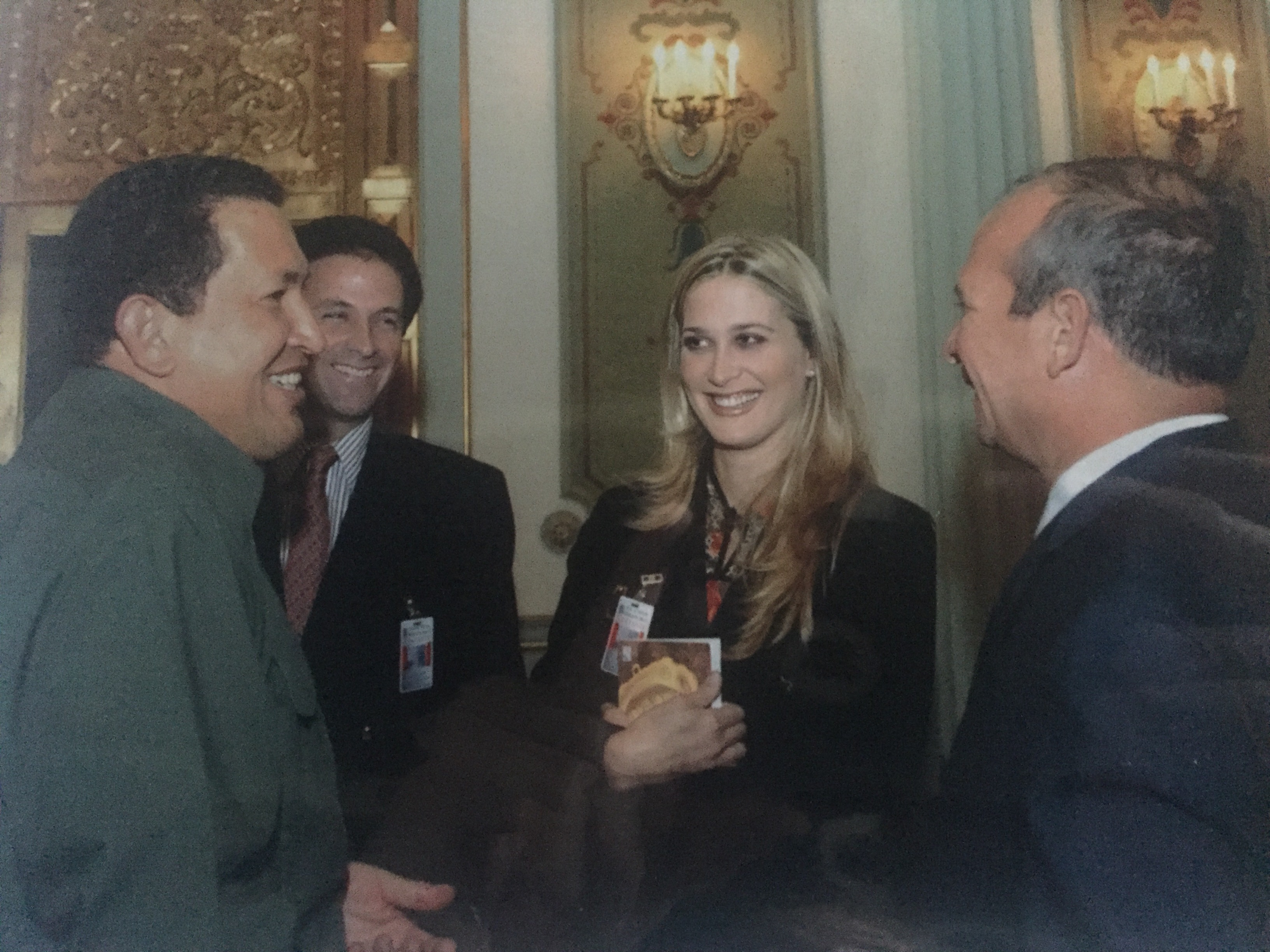
From left to right: Hugo Chávez, businessman Richard Boulton, his wife Marena Bencomo, and Carvajal. Carvajal worked actively in the resolution of the kidnapping of Boulton in Colombia

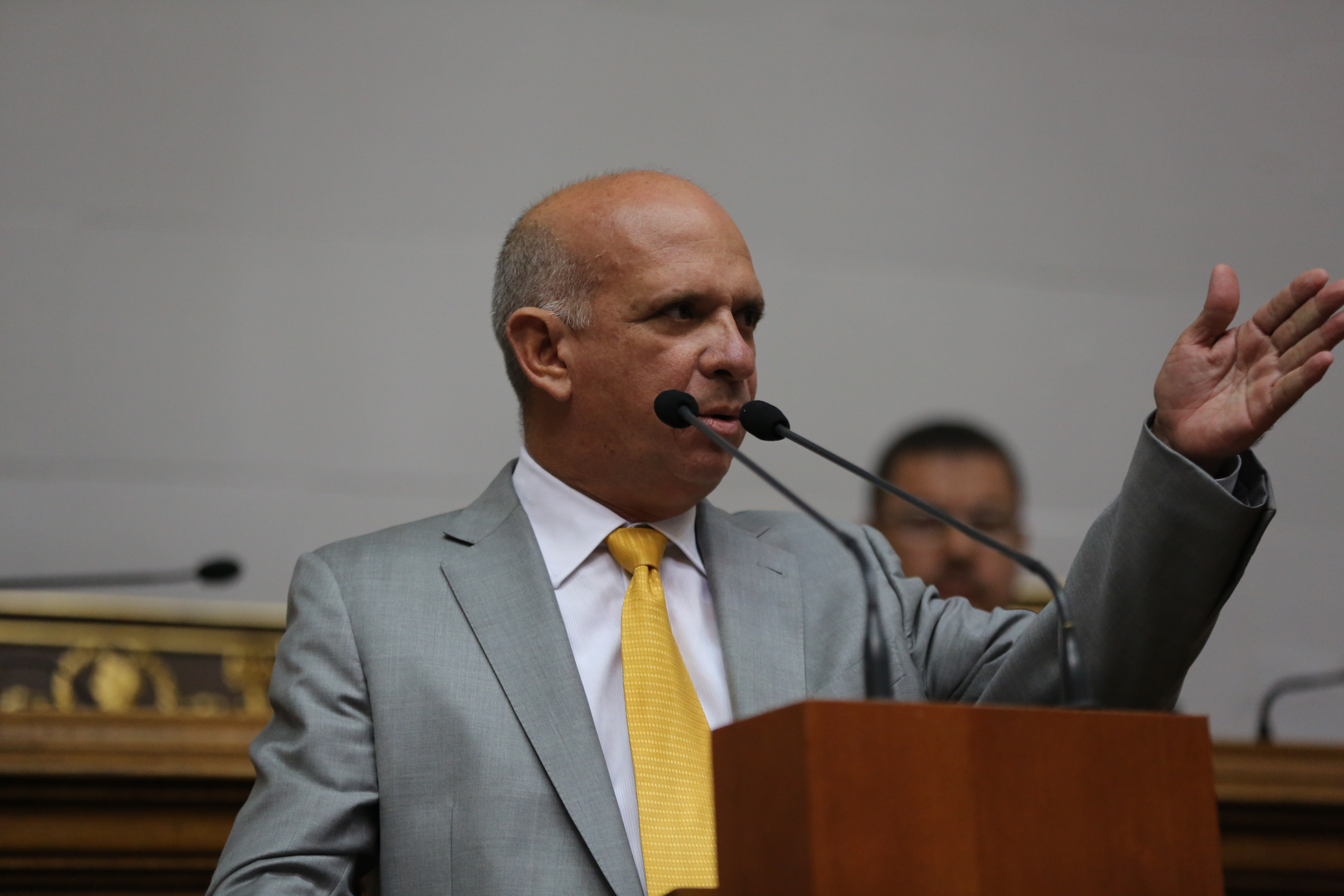
Carvajal as Deputy of the National Assembly

Hugo Armando Carvajal Barrios, nicknamed El Pollo ("The Chicken")(born April 1, 1960), is a Venezuelan diplomat, retired general and narcoterrorist. He was the head of the military intelligence in Venezuela during Hugo Chávez's government, from July 2004 to December 2011. Carvajal was arrested in Spain on 12 April 2019 based on an arrest warrant from the United States for 2011 drug trafficking charges. After the Spanish courts approved his extradition to the United States Carvajal went into hiding. On 26 March 2020, the U.S. Department of State offered $10 million for information to bring him to justice in relation to drug trafficking and narco-terrorism. In 2021 he was arrested in Madrid and was extradited two years later to the United States. In 2025, he pled guilty to all criminal charges.

== Biography ==
=== Early life ===
Hugo Armando Carvajal Barrios was born on 1 April 1960, in Puerto La Cruz, Anzoátegui state. He finished his studies at the military academy in 1981.

His sister, Wilma Carvajal, was the Mayor of the Cedeño Municipality.

=== Career ===
Carvajal met Hugo Chávez in 1980 at the Military Academy of Venezuela, where Chávez was his instructor. Carvajal took part in the February 1992 Venezuelan coup attempt organised by Chávez against the government of Carlos Andrés Pérez. Participants of that coup were granted a general amnesty from president Rafael Caldera in 1994.

In September 2008, the United States Department of the Treasury's Office of Foreign Assets Control (OFAC) accused Carvajal of helping Colombian guerrilla FARC in its drug trafficking activities by protecting them from drugs seizures, supplying weapons and providing with Venezuelan official documents. He was placed on the list together with Henry Rangel Silva, Director of Venezuela's Directorate of Intelligence and Prevention Services, who later became Minister of Defense and Governor of Trujillo and with Ramón Rodríguez Chacín, former Minister of the Interior & Security.

Carvajal was appointed head of the National Official against Organized Crime and Financing of Terrorism in October 2012. In April 2013 he was appointed as the replacement for Wilfredo Figueroa Chacín as head of the Military Counterintelligence.

=== Arrest ===
Venezuela appointed Carvajal as its consul in Aruba in January 2014, however he had not been officially accepted by the Dutch government. He was arrested in Aruba on 22 July 2014 on a U.S. arrest warrant. Venezuelan President Nicolás Maduro protested saying Carvajal had diplomatic immunity. As a protest Venezuela closed its airspace to planes coming from Aruba and Curaçao for several hours, leaving hundreds of passengers stranded. Maduro also threatened to slow down business at the Isla oil refinery on Curaçao. On 28 July, he was released and flown back to Venezuela by private plane. Aruba officials declared that Dutch foreign minister Frans Timmermans had decided to recognize Carvajal's immunity. The Netherlands declared Carvajal persona non grata. In a public appearance Maduro stated: "We had a plan to escalate tension in Latin America".

One day after his release information was released that Venezuela had sent four military ships close to the shores of Aruba while Carvajal was detained. The United States Department of State said that it had evidence for severe threats by Venezuela against both Aruba and the Netherlands. The Dutch Ministry of Foreign Affairs said it had contact with Venezuela about the military ships, with Venezuela stating that they were returning from an exercise. The Dutch Ministry of Foreign Affair also stated that Carvajal was released after strictly judicial considerations based on international law.

Carvajal is also wanted by Colombia for the torture and murder of two agents.

=== Support for Guaidó ===
On 21 February 2019, during the Venezuelan presidential crisis, Carvajal made a video in support of Juan Guaidó as interim president of Venezuela and criticized Nicolás Maduro's presidency. Carvajal called for Venezuelan military forces to break ranks and to allow the shipping of humanitarian aid to Venezuela.

Maduro expelled Carvajal from the Armed Forces on 4 April, degraded his Major General status, and accused him of treason.

=== Cocaine trafficking conspiracy charges ===
Carvajal was arrested in Spain by local authorities in 2019 at the behest of the U.S. government. His extradition to the United States to stand trial for drug trafficking was not carried out after a Spanish court rejected the American request. The denial was appealed and then overturned in 2019 but Carvajal had disappeared by that point. In September 2021, he was arrested again by Spanish authorities after hiding out in Madrid for two years. His asylum claim was denied in October 2021 and his extradition was approved to go forward. The extradition was put on hold again after Carvajal appealed to the European Court of Human Rights.

Carvajal faced charges of trafficking cocaine to the U.S. in a "narcoterrorism" conspiracy while using weapons. On 13 July 2023, the European Court of Human Rights denied his request to avoid extradition, and five days later, Spain's High Court allowed for him to be immediately extradited to the United States. On 19 July 2023, he was extradited from Spain, arriving in New York. Charges against Carvajal filed by the U.S. Attorney's Office for the Southern District of New York include cocaine importation and firearms-related charges. When he was arraigned in the Manhattan federal court on 20 July 2023, he pled not guilty.

One week before trial, Carvajal pled guilty in June 2025 to all charges, with the possibility of sentencing of up to 50 years to life in prison. The delayed change in his plea, according to the BBC, "led to speculation he may have reached a deal for a lower sentence in exchange for providing incriminating information about the Maduro's government"; Joshua Goodman of the Associated Press reported that Carvajal's attorneys said the prosecutor announced that no plea deal was offered. Journalist Antonio Maria Delgado wrote in the Miami Herald that Carvajal claims to have evidence about Venezuela's involvement with Iran and Colombia's FARC, election tampering, espionage within the U.S., and Maduro's involvement with the gang Tren de Aragua as a "paramilitary arm of the state". Goodman wrote that Carvajal might have information about the voting machine company Smartmatic. According to Delgado, Carvajal's "cooperation could dramatically expand the U.S. government's understanding of Venezuela's deep state", but his claims would need to be independently verified as "Carvajal has a history of shifting loyalties and politically motivated statements".
