= Iván Hernández Dala =

Venezuelan military personnel

Head of the DGCIM
- In office 20 January 2014 – 14 October 2024
- Preceded by: MG Hugo Carvajal
- Succeeded by: MG Javier Marcano Tábata

Head of the Presidential Honor Guard
- In office September 2015 – 14 October 2024

Personal details
- Born: 18 May 1966 (age 60) Caracas, Venezuela
- Party: PSUV

Military service
- Allegiance: Venezuela
- Branch/service: Venezuelan Army
- Rank: Brigadier general

Iván Hernández Dala (born 18 May 1966) was the head of Directorate General of Military Counterintelligence (DGCIM) and head of the Venezuelan Presidential Honor Guard between 2014 and 2024.

== 2019 Venezuelan uprising ==
During the 2019 Venezuelan uprising, Hernández was named as a potential high-ranking official who allegedly met with those plotting to overthrow Nicolás Maduro.

== International sanctions ==
As being head of DGCIM, an institution accused of torturing and imprisoning opponents of Nicolas Maduro, Hernández Dala was sanctioned by the European Union in June 2018, Switzerland on 10 July 2018, the United States in February 2019 and Canada on 15 April 2019.

== See also ==
- International sanctions during the Venezuelan crisis
