= Bolivarian National Guard of Venezuela =

Branch of the National Armed Forces of Venezuela

- Guardia Nacional Bolivariana de Venezuela
- National Guard emblem
- Founded: 1937; 89 years ago
- Country: Venezuela
- Branch: National Bolivarian Armed Forces of Venezuela
- Type: Military police
- Role: Gendarmerie, forestry protection, civil defense, public order and safety, border control, highway security, coastal security
- Size: 23,000
- Part of: Ministry of Defense, Ministry of Interior and Justice
- Nicknames: Spanish: Centinelas Permanentes de la Patria; The Fatherland's Permanent Sentries
- Patron: Our Lady of the Rosary of Chiquinquirá
- Mottos: Spanish: El honor es su divisa Honor is its emblem
- Colors: Maroon
- Anniversaries: August 4, National Guard Day

Commanders
- Minister of Defense: Major General Gustavo González López

Insignia
- Flag

The Bolivarian National Guard of Venezuela (Spanish: Guardia Nacional Bolivariana de Venezuela - GNB), is a gendarmerie component of the National Armed Forces of Venezuela. The national guard can serve as gendarmerie, perform civil defense roles, or serve as a reserve light infantry force. The national guard was founded on 4 August 1937 by the then President of the Republic, General-in-Chief Eleazar López Contreras. The motto of the GNB is "El Honor es su divisa" ("Honor is its emblem"), slightly different from the motto of the Spanish Civil Guard "El Honor es mi divisa" ("Honor is my emblem").

The branch is recognized for its human rights violations under the Bolivarian government and its alleged involvement in international drug trafficking through the Cartel of the Suns.

== History ==
The National Guard traces its roots to the gendarmerie and rural police formations organized in 1811 by the National Government and in the subsequent National Police Guard raised in 1841 by President José Antonio Páez, both later disbanded.

=== Founding ===
In 1934, the Defense Minister General in Chief Eleazar López Contreras, busy with the preparations for his own presidency and in his duty of creating and expanding the national army and navy, realized the long need of public security in a time of civil unrest under President Juan Vicente Gómez, in their meetings during that year. In the middle of the year, he had conversations with Venezuelan diplomat Rufino Blanco Fombona, who suggested forming a national gendarmerie modeled on the successes of the Spanish Civil Guard and on the Peruvian Civil Guard, as well as the various other police forces in South America.

Thus the idea of forming the National Guard was born.

On August 31, 1934, the Ministry of War and Navy Resolution no. 188 created the Technical Services School, located in Fort Paez, Maracay. The school trained technical service personnel in military technologies and public security. Its Special Classes course arrived the next year.

Upon the death of General Gomez on December 17, 1935, Lopez Contreas became president. The next year, as Commander in Chief of the armed forces, he ordered the raising of a National Frontier Police to protect the national borders and raised mounted security units to protect the peace in the Venezuelan plains. In that same year, a Spanish military mission arrived to help form and train a fully national police force, led by Captain Cecillo Suarez of the Civil Guard. The Technical Services School's Special Classes, by that year, moved to Caracas, became independent and on September 16, 1935, was disbanded.

The next day a Presidential decree ordered the formation of the Public Security Agents Formation School. It opened in Villa Zolia, Caracas on October 28 the same year, with Captain Suarez as its principal guest. His speech implied the basic principles of the future national police force: As "sentinels of the people", a part of the armed forces as a public order and security service, maintaining the law and order, defending social lives and to become the "armed shoulder of the Executive Power" and as an intervening force in times of disorder.

On August 4, 1937, the National Guard was raised via a Presidential Decree of President Eleazar López Contreras, published in the Official Gazette. The presidential decree divided the National Guard into the National Guard of the Interior (subdivided into the Highway, Rural, Health, and Urban Services) and the Frontier National Guard, and set its joint command structure under the Ministries of War and Navy and of the Interior and Justice, absorbing into the new service the personnel of the National Frontier Police. As a national police force, it was mandated to have its own investigations service. As a result, the PSAFS became first the National Police Academy and later the National Public Security Academy.

On its first graduation on October 12, 1937, Sgt. Martin Torres gave an emotional address to his fellow graduates and to the honorary guests, thanking the Government and the Spanish military mission for forming the new service. The Mission organized the new service until 1941 and thus completed the Charter of the National Guard (based on the Charter of the Civil Guard), with its motto, "Honor is Its Emblem" (based on the Spanish Civil Guard motto). The first National Guard station opened in Tachira on December 6 the same year.

In 1938, Congress passed the National Security Service Law. On November 8, Major Francisco de Paula Angarita Arvelo, Venezuelan Army, was appointed the first Commanding General of the National Guard, thus the National Guard became an independent arm of the Army. In 1940 the first officer training course was commenced. The service was hit hard by a 1941 reduction but debuted, with the help of the Federal Bureau of Investigation of the United States, the Military and Police Intelligence Training courses, in 1944. In the same year, via General Orders 16 on April 13 that same year, its joint command structure and duties were amended and the service was formed into a brigade-sized formation.

=== Fourth Republic of Venezuela ===
In 1945, the service defended the government of President Isaias Medina Angarita against a coup. In the aftermath, now Lieutenant Torres assumed the leadership of the National Guard becoming the first National Guard officer to become the commanding general, and the service adopted the green uniforms of the Venezuelan Army, abandoning its earlier blue uniforms. Several of the officers of the service had earlier served in the Army before, and in the earlier days, the officer corps was made up of Army officers seconded into the service.

In 1946, it became the Armed Forces of Cooperation. The National Guard Academy and the National Guardsmen Formation School were both created that year. The National Guard held its first officers' graduation in 1947 at its Villa Zolia campus.

A Chilean military mission led by the Carabineros de Chile helped reorganize the National Guard in the same year. Partly as a result it later expanded its responsibilities in the 1950s to include penitentiary protection and security, maritime security, forestry protection, and highway patrol duties as well as security in the tourism sector and even in dog handling. Its present formation of 12 regional commands dates from 1950 when the 1st Regional Command was raised. In the late 1970s, the Guard established its own air arm.

=== Bolivarian Republic of Venezuela ===
Following the Bolivarian Revolution, the Venezuelan National Guard was renamed the Bolivarian National Guard of Venezuela (GNB).

Since then, the GNB have cooperated with paramilitaries known as colectivos within the country.

== Organization ==
The National Guard is structured as follows.

- Commanding General of the National Guard (as of 2023):
- General Staff of the National Guard: Chief of Staff of the National Guard:
- Inspector General's Command: Inspector General of the National Guard:
- Personnel Command: Commanding General, Personnel Command:
- Logistics Command: Director General, Logistics Command:
  - National Guard HQ Support Regiment
  - 1st Support Detachment
  - 2nd Support Detactment
  - 3rd Support Detacthment
- Operations Command: Operations Director of the National Guard:

Controls eight or more Mobile Detachments of battalion or regiment size available for deployment to any area of the country in response to threats to internal security or border security.

The command has under its control all nine "regional commands" which control local battalion or regiment-sized National Guard detachments which provide the static defense of certain public buildings, oil installations, and penal institutions (the latter duties now shared with the Policia Nacional Bolivariana) and for the maintenance of public security. They patrol the nation's highway system, functioning as a federal highway police force.

They serve as the nation's coast guard and maritime search and rescue service, co-sharing with the Bolivarian Navy of Venezuela's Coast Guard Command in this duty in the coastal states. These are now subdivided into state-level zone commands serving all the states of Venezuela. Most of the RCs and SZCs also control the 16 local rural service commando battalions for keeping order in rural communities, but only the Caracas Capital District ZS has none, instead of having 7 area detachments as of present with 3 regiment sized.

  - Regional Command 1 San Antonio de Tachira, Tachira State
    - Tachira National Guard Zone Command
    - Mérida National Guard Zone Command
  - Regional Command 2 Valencia, Carabobo State
    - Cojedes National Guard Zone Command
    - Carabobo National Guard Zone Command
    - Aragua National Guard Zone Command
  - Regional Command 3 Maracaibo, Zulia State
    - Zulia National Guard Zone Command
  - Regional Command 4 Barquisimeto, Lara State
    - Lara National Guard Zone Command
    - Falcon National Guard Zone Command
    - Yaracuy National Guard Zone Command
  - Regional Command 5 Caracas, Capital District
    - Venezuelan Capital District National Guard Zone Command
    - Vargas and Federal Dependencies National Guard Zone Command
    - Orinoco Oil Fields Special Zone Command
    - Miranda and Insular Territory National Guard Zone Command
  - Regional Command 6 San Fernando de Apure, Apure State
    - Apure National Guard Zone Command
    - Barinas National Guard Zone Command
    - Portuguesa National Guard Zone Command
  - Regional Command 7 Barcelona, Anzoategui State
    - Guarico National Guard Zone Command
    - Anzoátegui National Guard Zone Command
    - Nueva Esparta National Guard Zone Command
    - Sucre National Guard Zone Command
  - Regional Command 8 Puerto Ordaz, Bolivar State
    - Bolivar National Guard Zone Command
    - Delta Amaruco National Guard Zone Command
  - Regional Command 9 Puerto Ayacucho, Amazonas State
    - Amazonas National Guard Zone Command
  - Air Operations Command (Air National Guard)
  - Coastal Vigilance Command - Commanding General, CVC:
  - National Guard Customs Security Service
  - National Guard Frontier Detachments
  - National Guard Public Order and Security Units
  - National Guard Corps of Engineers
  - National Guard Criminal Investigations Service
- Education Command: Commander, Education Command:
  - National Guard Military Academy

Superintendent of the National Guard Academy:
Deputy Superintendent of the National Guard Academy:
Commandant of the Regiment of Cadets:

  - National Guard Formation Schools
  - National Guard Military High School
- Special Operations Command
  - Commando Action Group of the National Guard
  - National Guard Rural Commando Detachments
- People's Guards National Command - Commanding General, People's Guards National Command:

Created by Hugo Chávez in 2011 for Guardsmen mandated for police protection alongside the Bolivarian National Police and aimed at keeping peace and order as well as fighting against drug-related and alcohol-related crimes and the illegal arms and drug trade in the country. They also help in public works repairs and ensuring security during major holidays.

The service today is composed of 17 state-level People's Guards Regiments in several of the States of Venezuela and the Venezuelan Capital District, with more to be raised soon, together with 29 independent People's Guards Battalions and 21 Public Safety Battalions in major cities nationwide. The regiments are each divided into 2 to 4 battalion-sized detachments and a headquarters unit.

- Anti-Drug National Command - Commanding General:

This command is in charge of combating the use and spread of illegal drugs in Venezuela and works with other South American police forces in fighting the illegal drug trade in the continent.

- National Development Department
- National Guard Environmental Security Service Directorate

Mandated for the protection of Venezuela's natural resources, especially the ancestral lands of its indigenous peoples, and the enforcement of environmental laws.

- Social Action Division of the National Guard (in the planning stages)
- Anti-Extortion and Kidnapping National Command

The newest command of the National Guard mandated to counter financial crimes and serious criminal activities formed up of the National Guard Anti-Extortion and Kidnapping Groups (GAES - Grupo Anti-Extorsión y Secuestro) in every Venezuelan state, created in April 2013. All the states plus the Capital District have one AESG detachment each to fight serious crimes. The command is led by Brigadier General Alexis Escalona Marrero.

=== Organization of State Commands ===
The State Commands of the National Guard are organized into:

- HQ and HQ Company
- People's Guards Regiment/Brigade
- Air National Guard Detachment/Squadron
- City National Guard detachments
- Urban Security Regiment/Battalion
- Rural NG detachments
- Border Detachment (in border states)
- Anti-Drugs and Narcotics Unit
- Anti-Kidnapping Task Force
- Coastal Vigilance Detachment (coastal states)

== Recruitment ==
The GNB is an all-volunteer force with over 38,000 men and women. Recruits undergo a two-year basic training course at the Ramo Verde National Guard Formation School at Los Teques, as well as at various formation schools nationwide. Officer candidates are required to study for an additional four years at the National Guard Military Academy in Fort Tiuna, Caracas, and at the Military Technical Academy in Maracay for the technical service officers. Postgraduate studies for officers are available at the Advanced Officers School at Caricuao, near Caracas.

== Uniforms and equipment ==
=== Uniforms and insignia ===
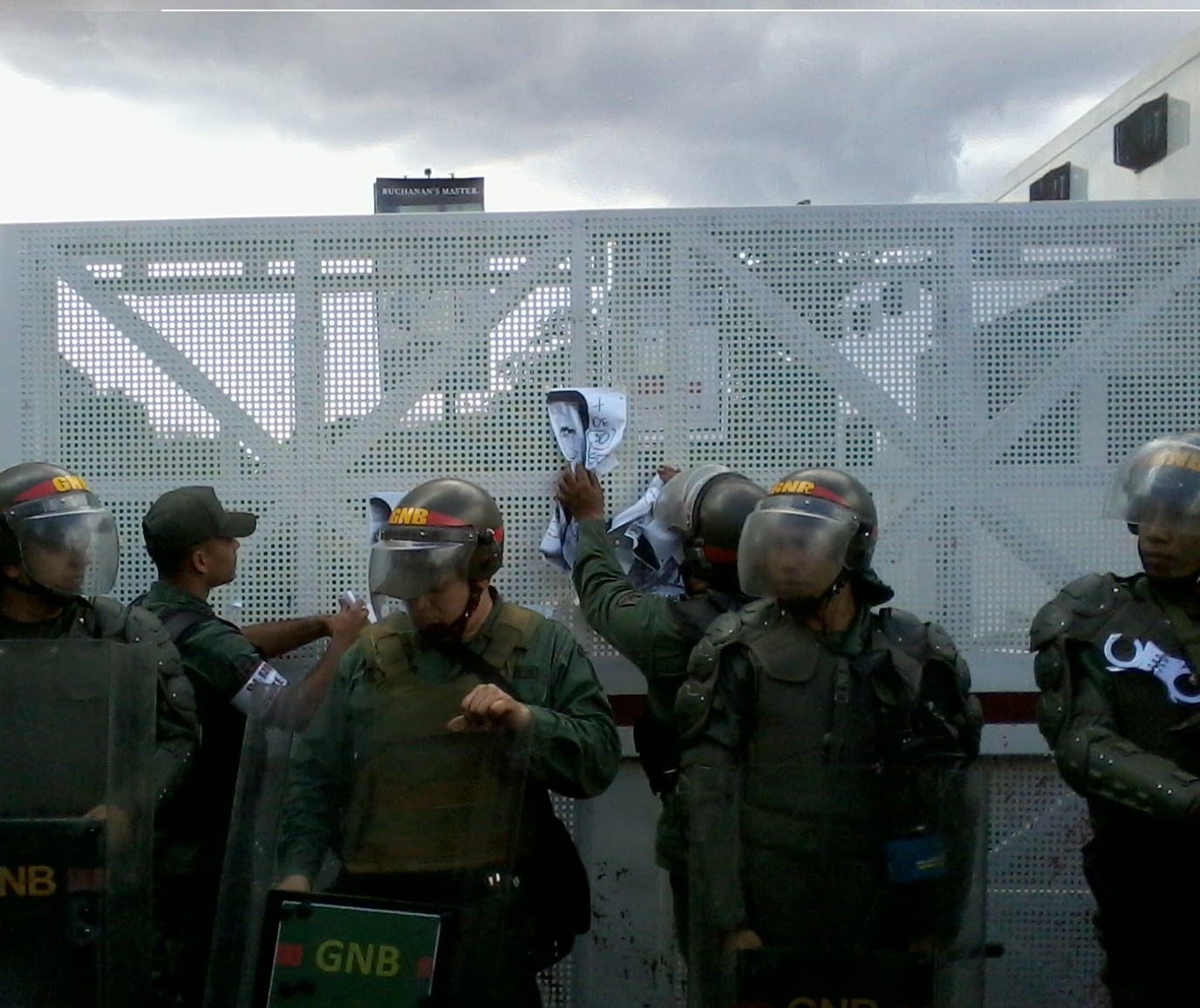
During 2014 protests

The GNB have the same rank insignia and uniforms as the Venezuelan Army. However, the GNB normally wears a maroon beret instead of the Army's black berets.

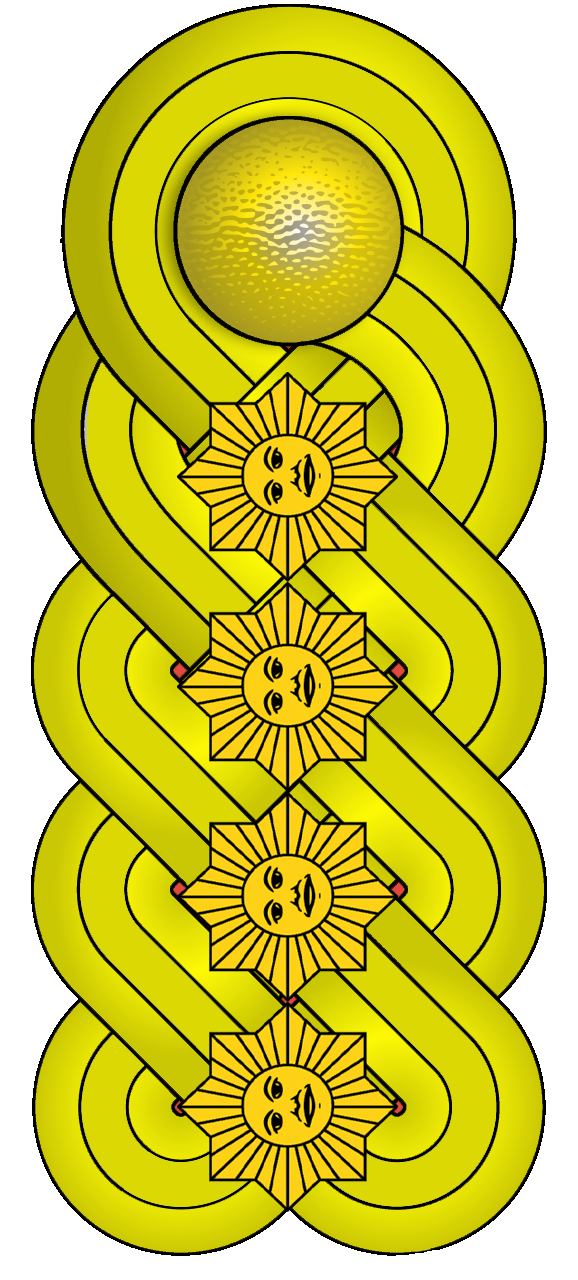
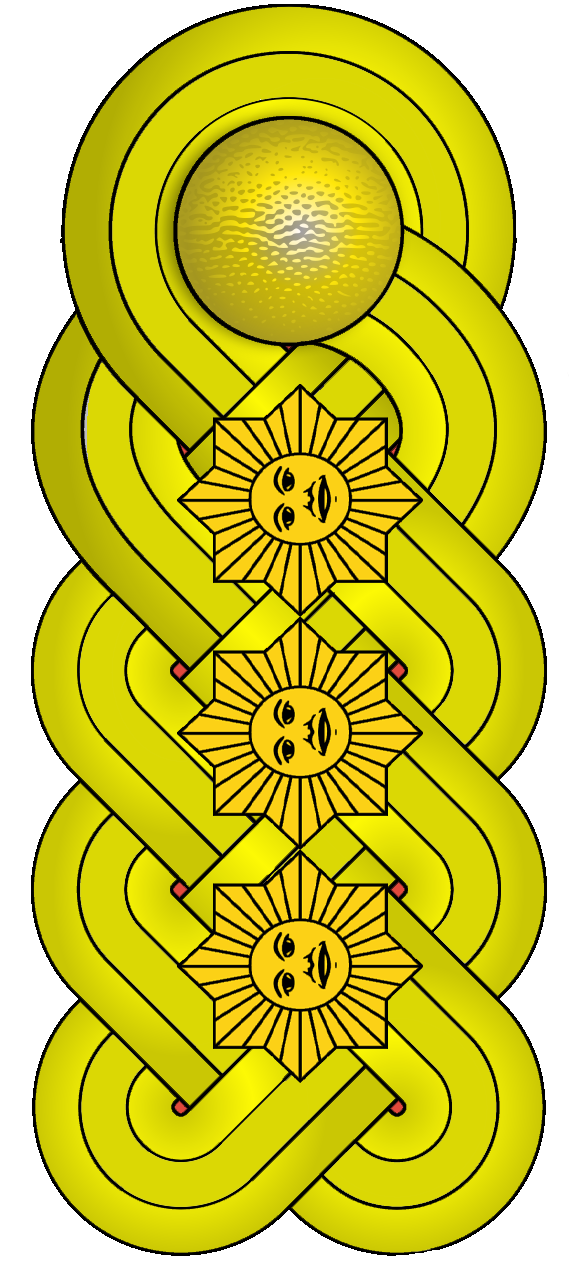
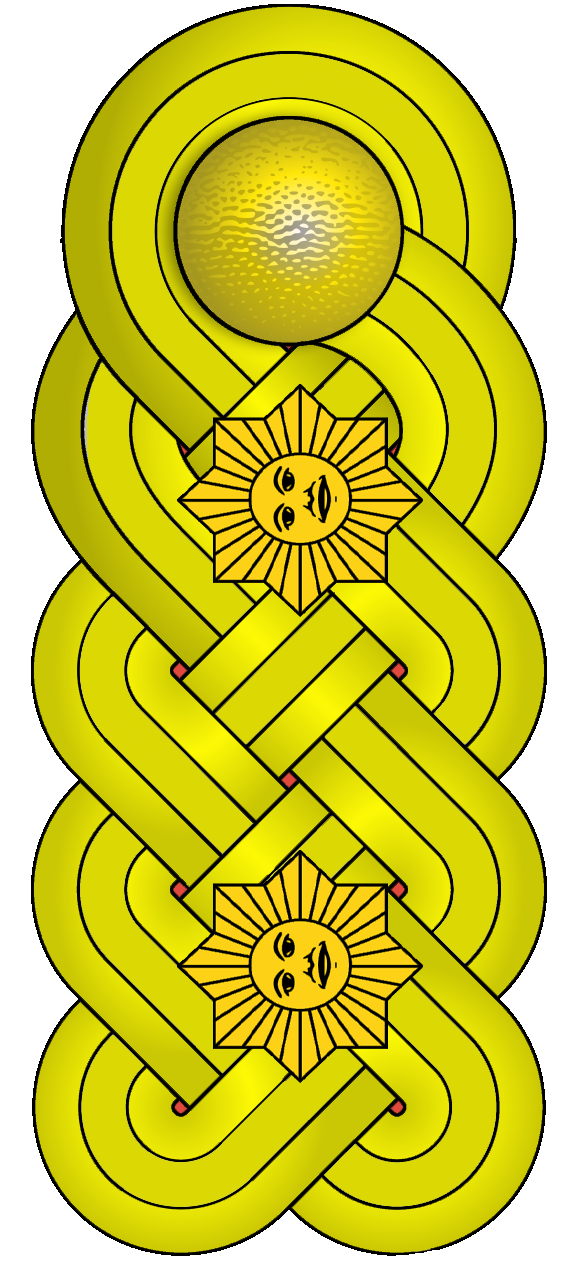
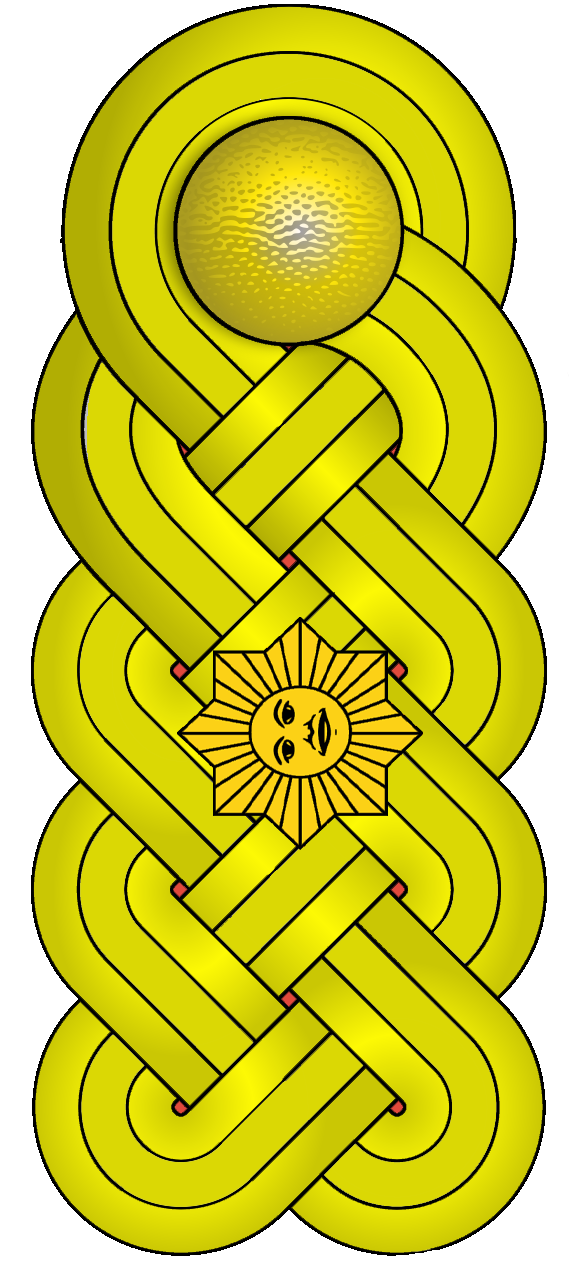
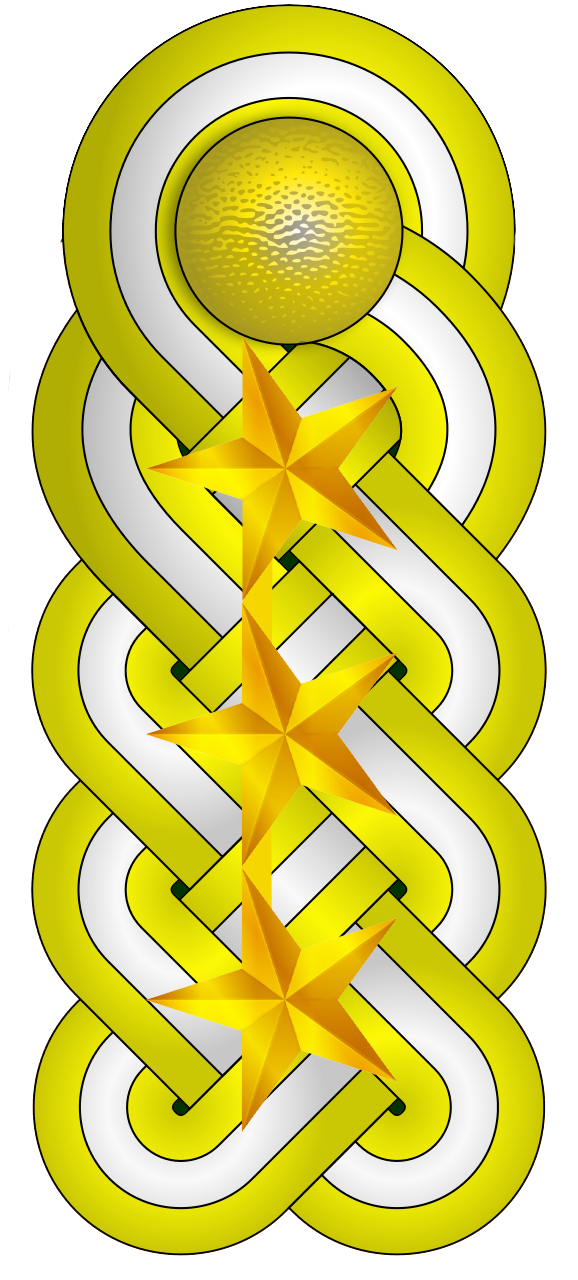
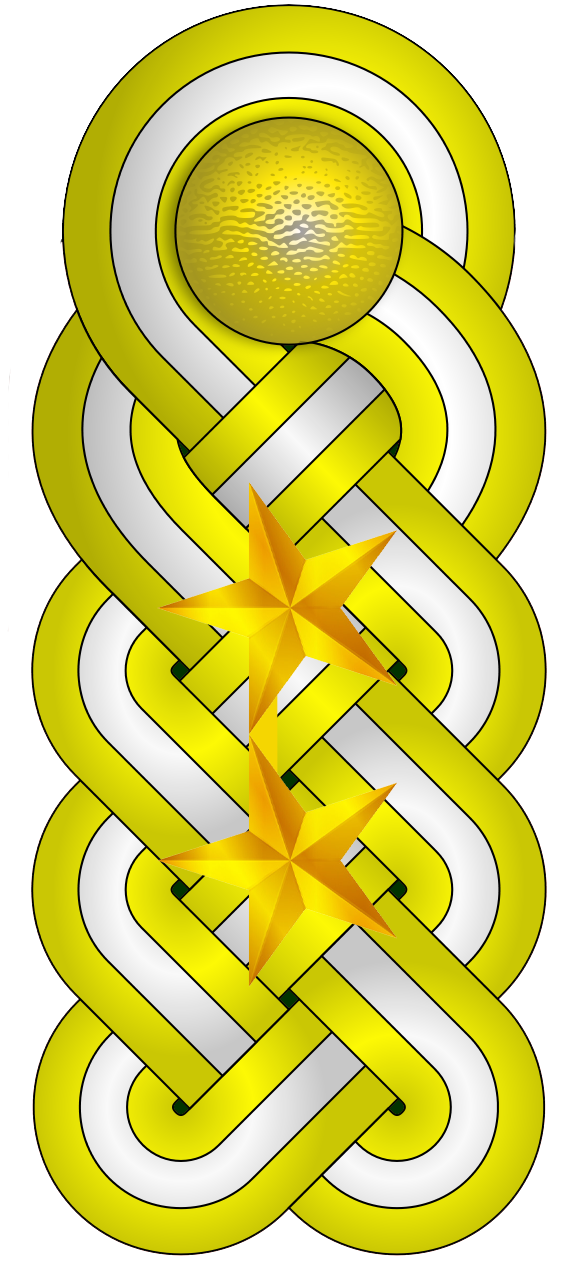
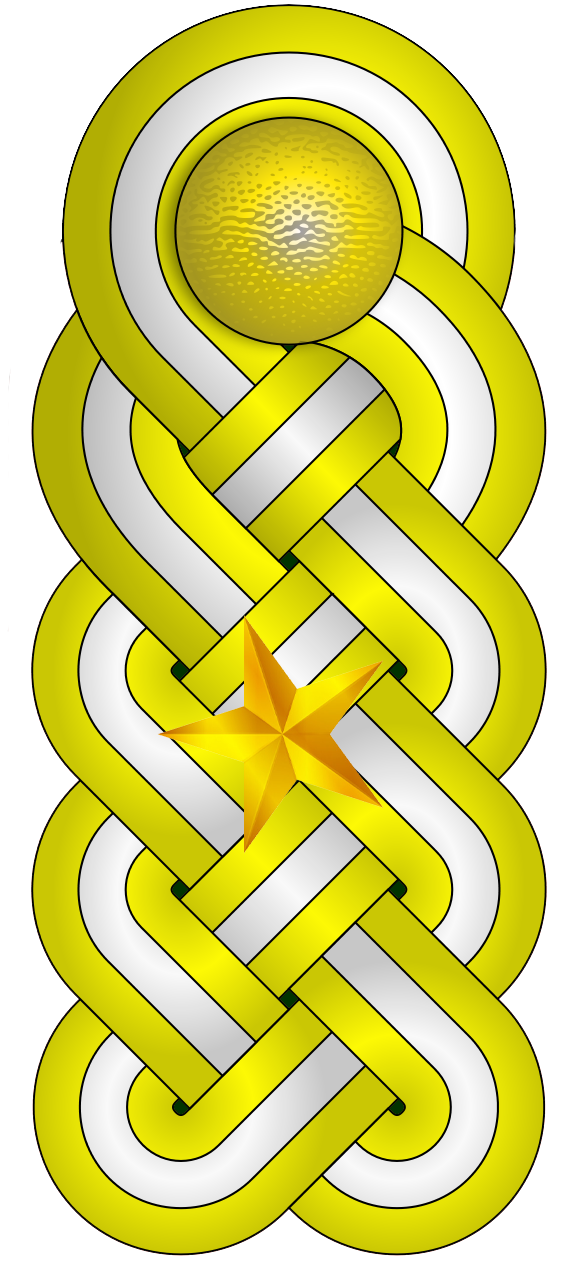
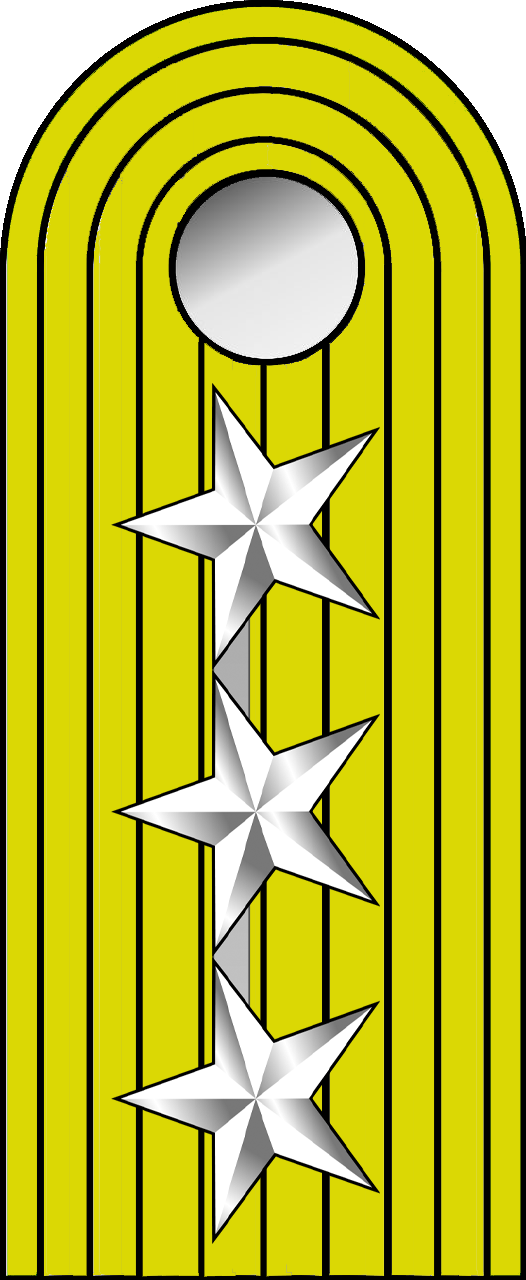
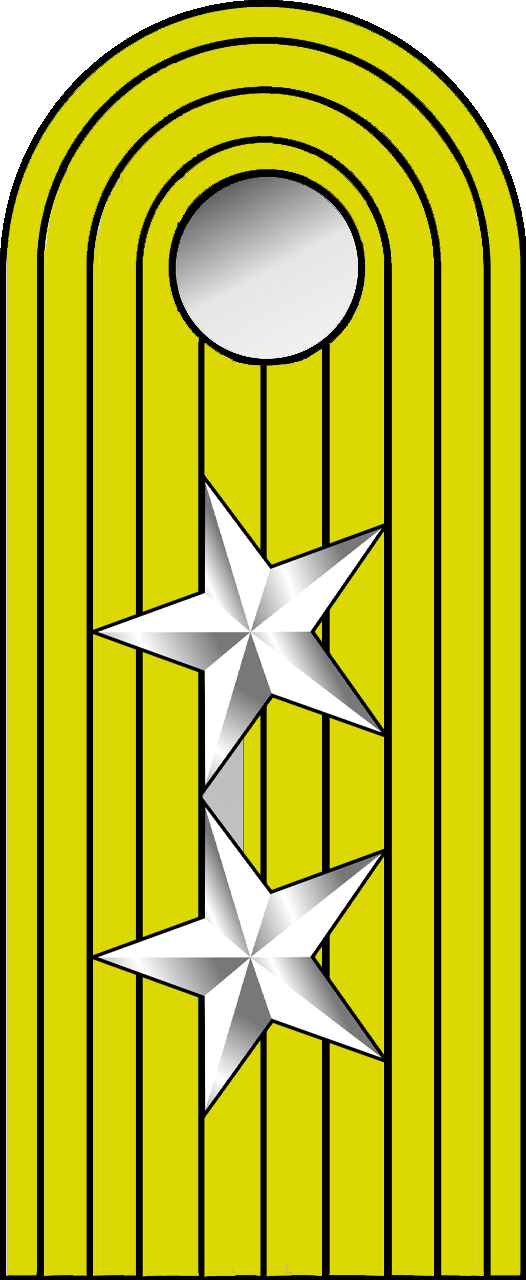
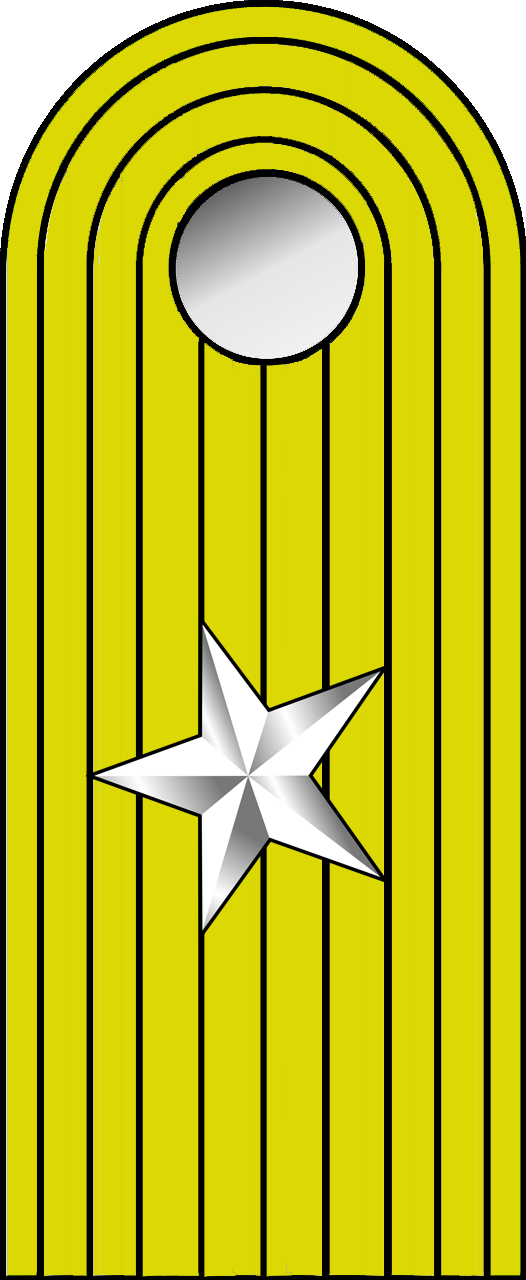
Rank group	General / flag officers				Senior officers			Junior officers
Venezuelan Army
Venezuelan Army	General en jefe	Mayor general	General de division	General de brigada	Coronel	Teniente coronel	Mayor	Capitán	Primer teniente	Teniente

Rank group	Senior NCOs							Junior NCOs		Enlisted
Venezuelan National Guard											No insignia
Venezuelan National Guard	Sargento supervisor	Sargento ayudante	Sargento mayor de primera	Sargento mayor de segunda	Sargento mayor de tercera	Sargento primero	Sargento segundo	Cabo primero	Cabo segundo	Distinguido	Guardia Nacional raso

=== Equipment ===
The GNB is equipped as a light infantry force, with the standard-issued weapon being the FN FAL battle rifle (being replaced with the AK-103). It is also equipped with Light Machine-Guns, and mortars up to 81mm.

It possesses over forty Unimog UR-416 wheeled armored personnel carriers and Walther G22 on airports. It acquired 141 Chinese Norinco VN-4 4x4 wheeled armored vehicles in 2012, and 50 in 2013. In 2014, during the 2014 Venezuelan protests, the Venezuelan government order 300 more VN-4 vehicles. During the 2014-17 Venezuelan protests and 2019 Venezuelan uprising, the VN-4 was used by the Bolivarian National Guard against protesters who opposed the government of President Nicolas Maduro. In July 2013, it ordered Chinese Type 63A light tanks. Austrian and Japanese vehicles are also used.

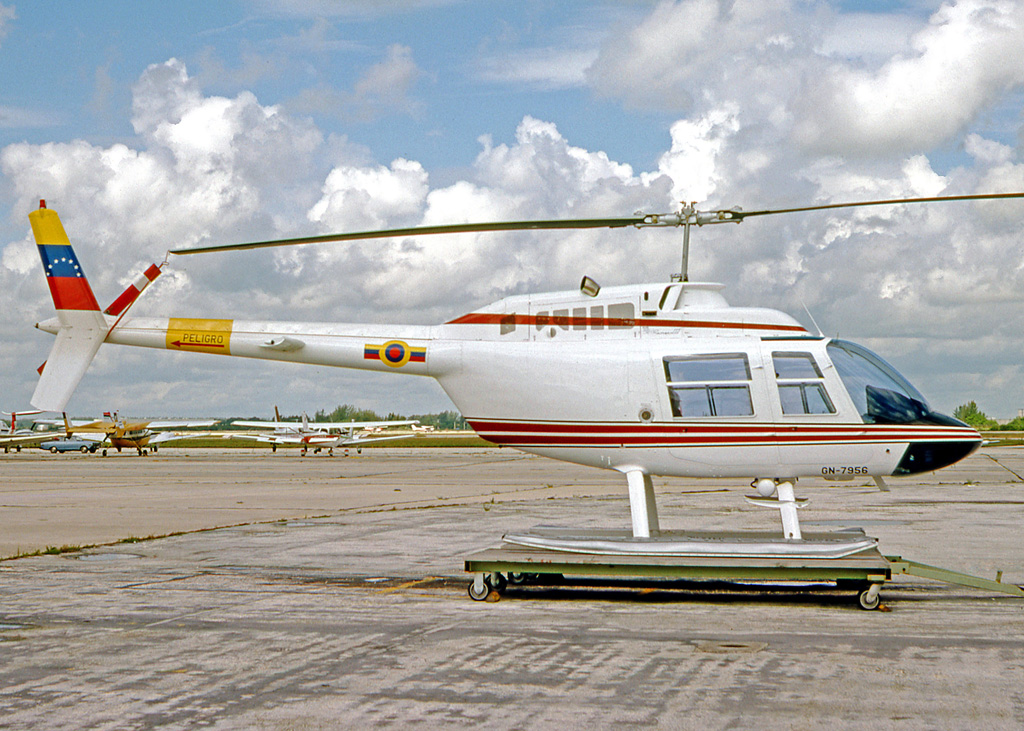
Bell Jet Ranger of the GNB in 1979.

The GNB also employs eighty small craft for coastal and river patrol duties as part of its Naval Coastal Vigilance Command. The Air National Guard Command operates over 50 fixed-wing light aircraft and helicopters.

== Controversies ==
=== Drug trade ===
In 1993, the term Cartel de los Soles or Cartel of the Suns was first used when allegations of two National Guard generals, who wore emblems that looked like suns on their uniforms, were investigated for drug trafficking crimes. The term currently describes high-ranking members of the Venezuelan armed forces, including the National Guard, who are involved in drug trade.

Even lower ranking National Guardsmen compete for positions at border checkpoints so they can be paid bribes for "illicit trade", with a large portion of the bribes going to their superiors. The corrupt officials of The Sun Cartel traffic drugs from Colombia to Venezuela where they are shipped internationally. It has been alleged that the National Guard had worked with the FARC with drug trade.

In September 2013, an incident allegedly linked to Cartel of the Suns and involving men from the Venezuelan National Guard who placed 31 suitcases containing 1.3 tons of cocaine on a Paris flight astonished French authorities as it was the largest seizure of cocaine recorded in mainland France. On 15 February 2014, a commander for the Venezuelan National Guard was stopped while driving to Valencia with his family and was arrested for having 554 kilos of cocaine in his possession.

=== Actions during Venezuelan protests ===
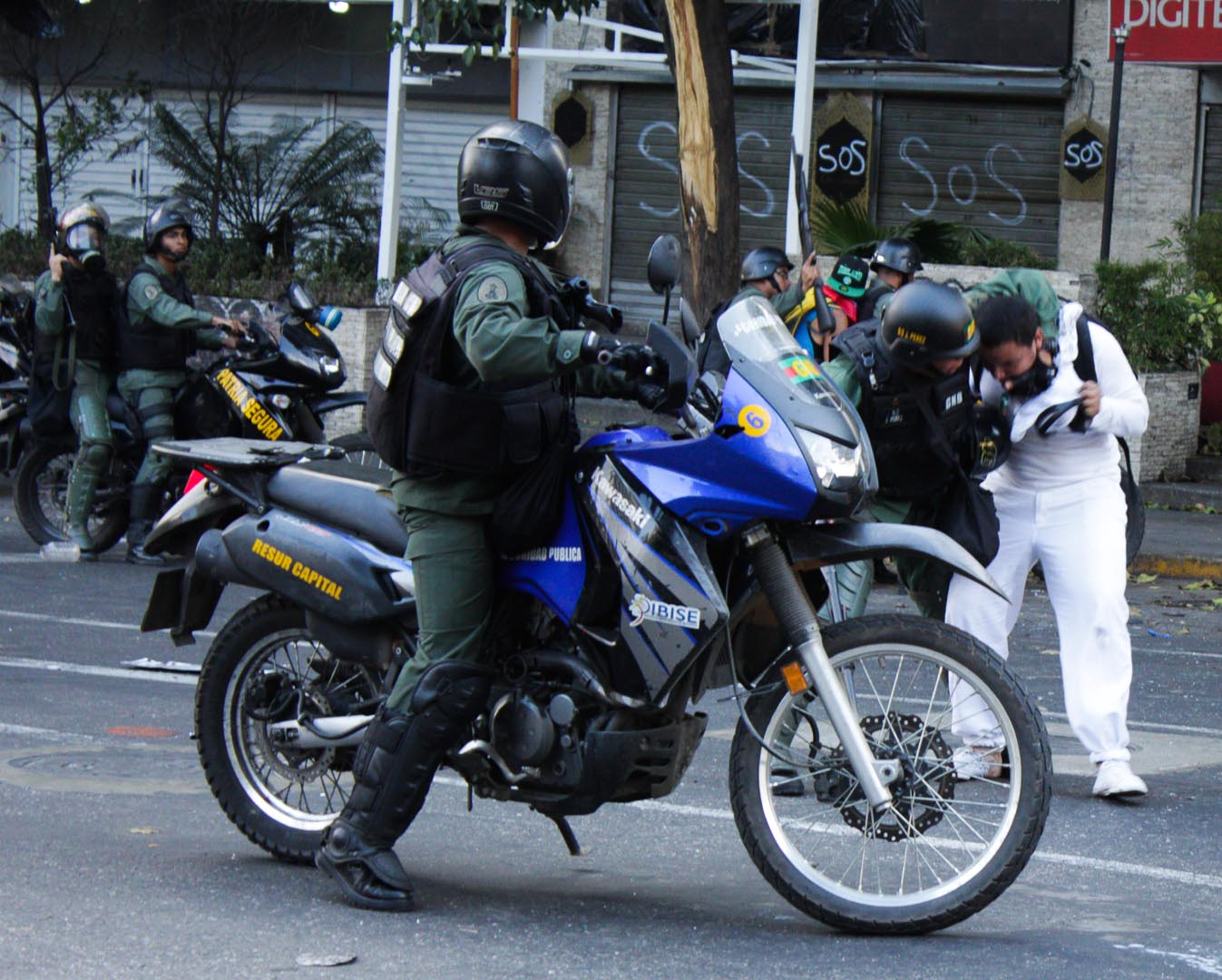
Venezuelan National Guardsman holding a protester in a headlock.

The National Guard used tear gas and rubber bullets on anti-government demonstrators during the 2010s protests in the crisis in Venezuela, during which 9 members of the National Guard were killed. There are reports alleging that the Venezuelan National Guard has worked with pro-Maduro groups, called "colectivos" while dispersing protesters. The National Guard allegedly protected the Tupamaro colectivo that were "armed with guns, motorcycles and shooting protesters".

In 2014, Human Rights Watch reported that "many victims and family members we spoke with said they believed they might face reprisals if they reported abused by police, guardsmen, or armed pro-government gangs." It also reported that a man attempting to leave a protest was shot with rubber bullets, beaten and then shot again in the groin by guardsmen. Another man was detained, shot repeatedly with rubber bullets, beaten with rifles and helmets by three National Guardsman, and was asked "Who's your president?".

In 2014, NTN24 reported from a lawyer that National Guardsmen and individuals with "Cuban accents" in Mérida forced three arrested adolescents to confess to crimes they did not commit and then the adolescents "kneeled and were forced to raise their arms then shot with buckshot throughout their body" during an alleged "target practice". In Valencia, protesters were dispersed by the National Guard in El Trigál, where four students (three men and one woman) were attacked inside of a car while trying to leave the perimeter; the three men were imprisoned and one of them was allegedly sodomized by one of the officers with a rifle.

==== United States sanctions ====
Following alleged human rights violations by the Venezuelan National Guard during the protests, President Barack Obama used powers granted from the Venezuela Defense of Human Rights and Civil Society Act of 2014 and ordered the United States Department of the Treasury to freeze assets and property of former leader of the National Guard, Antonio José Benavides Torres, and former General Commander Justo José Noguera Pietri.

Additional sanctions were added on 29 August 2017 by President Donald J. Trump against the Venezuelan Government and Petroleos de Venezuela, S.A. (PDVSA), which is currently being run by Major Manuel Quevedo. These additional sanctions were due to the continuous allegations of public corruption, the persecution of violence against political opponents, as well as the establishment of what the United States considers the illegitimate Constituent Assembly. This executive order prohibits transactions made by a citizen of the United States or within the United States from the following; dealing new debt from PDVSA older than 90 days; dealing new debt or new equity older than 30 days from the Government of Venezuela (PDVSA not included); and the remittance of payments or distribution of profits to any individual, subgroup, corporation, or persons owned or controlled by the Government of Venezuela.

In order for the United States to continue addressing Venezuela's ongoing national emergency listed in Executive Order 13692, President Donald Trump signed Executive Order 13827 on 19 March 2018. This sanction is to prohibit all transactions issued by a United States Citizen or within the United States via digital currency, digital coin, or digital token to, or on behalf of the Government of Venezuela on or after 9 January 2018. This comes after President Nicolas Maduro announced the creation of a new digital currency, known as "Petro".

Due to the continuous oppression against their own Venezuelan citizens, the worsening economic crisis, and corruption, the United States President signed Executive Order 13835 on 21 May 2018. This sanction prohibits the purchase of debt owed to the Government of Venezuela and/or Petroleos de Venezuela (PDVSA), which includes money pledged as collateral made after the effective date of this Executive Order.

In conjunction with Executive Orders 13692 and 13835, the United States President signed Executive Order 13692 sanctioning the gold sector, essentially targeting corruption as well as those who have contributed to the crumbling infrastructure and exploitation of natural resources (PDVSA). This means that the United States citizens are prohibited from dealing with anyone having to do with the corruption and false transactions in the Venezuelan gold.

=== Management of food and basic goods ===
In 2004 the late President Hugo Chávez turned over the food industry to the Venezuelan Military and created what is now the Food Ministry. The Food Ministry was designed to create domestic farming, food factories and distributions centers, but after many years of neglect and the price of oil collapse of 2014, the domestic production dried up and the government could no longer afford to import what the country needed.

In order for imported goods to be accepted into Venezuela, the GNB requires bribes. This will ensure that the shipment is accepted and that the container is unloaded from the ship. Another payoff is needed to cover the cost to load the truck which will then transport the goods. If there are no incentives offered, any food or goods will sit to rot. The GNB has been accused of not only letting food rot, then burying the evidence, but also reselling food and merchandise kept at the port of entry for their own profit. They will sell to citizens and business owners who can afford it.

=== Trafficking between borders ===
More than drug trafficking, the GNB has been accused of helping gangs and cartels smuggle things such as fuel, food, and medicine between Colombia and Venezuela. Motorcycles known as “moscas” help guide state-owned PDVSA trucks and other similar vehicles through deserted trails to illegally sell gasoline and other basic goods across the border. A border which is secured by the GNB on the Venezuelan side, and by the Colombian guerrillas of the National Liberation Army on the Colombian side. Those gangs and cartels involved in the smuggling of these materials into Venezuela are said to pay a high incentive to the military or Guajiros (Venezuelan and Colombian Indian tribes) to get through private and isolated trails along the border successfully.

=== Military and mining ===
In 2016, Maduro paved way for what was originally the idea of the late President Hugo Chávez, by opening up the Orinoco Mining Arc (Arco Minero del Orinoco), over 170,000 square kilometers of Venezuelan Amazon to mine. The Orinoco Mining Arc started by giving mining access to countries like China, Russia, Canada, South Africa, the Republic of Congo and Australia. He then created CAMIMPEG, which is Venezuela's military-run oil and mining company.

Once Maduro felt that the business mining legitimacy was established, those countries that once had access were pushed out to make way for the military. Maduro then created the “Economic Military Zone” to help protect the mining area, leaving room for the Military to participate in not only the mining but to exploit the grounds. Some miners state that the GNB brought a sense of tranquility to the region, others claim that the GNB's power and control over both illegal and legal mining have become extremely dangerous to the country and to those seeking a better life.

Since opening up the Orinoco Mining Arc, it has not only affected the deforestation of the Amazon but has also unleashed diseases such as malaria and deaths from military and gang violence. One of the most recent massacres happened on 10 February 2018, in which 18 miners lost their lives. One of those killed was a legal mine operator, Angelis Rodriguez Cuevas. Cuevas had been negotiating to hand over her territory with the Venezuelan government when the GNB raided her mine, killing her and 17 others a few days later.

This is not the first time that the GNB has clashed with miners over the control of gold mines. Since the creation of the Orinoco Mining Arc by Nicolas Maduro, there have been at least four massacres in towns like Tumeremo and El Callao, located in the state of Bolivar. The military responded by stating that the miners were suspected criminals, to which they recovered several different types of guns, rifles and grenades. The Government of Venezuela opened up an investigation against the military, but nothing has come about.

While the Venezuelan Government receives a cut from the mining business, most of that gold is said to be smuggled out of the country by the GNB through Colombia and the Caribbean island for an even bigger profit. It is said that about 90 percent of Venezuelan gold is produced illegally, however, the Venezuelan Government denies these claims.

== See also ==
- National Guard (disambiguation)
