= Anti-Drug National Command =

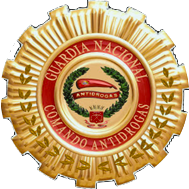
- Allegiance: Venezuela
- Branch: Venezuelan National Guard

Commanders
- Current commander: Arturo Olivar Moreno

The Anti-Drug National Command is an operating unit of the Venezuelan National Guard that is tasked with preventing illegal drug trade within Venezuela. The unit is headed by General Arturo Olivar.

== History ==
Univision has described the unit as a "low-profile" component of the National Guard. General Ramón Guillén Dávila, a commanding general of the Anti-Drug National Command was accused of drug trafficking in the 1990s. Ramón Guillén Dávila and his successor Orlando Hernández Villegas allegedly cooperated with the Central Intelligence Agency in "controlled deliveries of cocaine" in a program titled "Operation North". The CIA installed an operations center with the Anti-Drug National Command's offices in Colinas de Las Acacias urbanization of Caracas, establishing a direct network to the El Paso Intelligence Center. According to the United States Drug Enforcement Administration, over 200 kilograms destined for the United States reached USA but got lost in 1991. However, Operation North was performed with authorization and knowledge of the DEA and Venezuelan authorities. Both generals were later pardoned by President Carlos Andrés Pérez in 1993 and the CIA pulled out of Venezuela. The Operation North incident led to the origin of the term "Cartel of the Suns", the suspected involvement of Venezuelan generals in drug trafficking.

== Controversy ==
=== Drug trafficking ===
Officials linked to the Anti-Drug National Command have been sanctioned for their alleged participation with corruption in Venezuela. Néstor Reverol, who served under Guillén Dávila, was later accused of drug trafficking as well and was sanctioned by the United States in 2016. Eustiquio José Lugo Gómez, the former Operations Director was sanctioned by the United States on 27 June 2019.

Low-ranking members have also been involved in drug trafficking incidents. On 11 September 2013, French officials seized 1.3 tons of cocaine arriving from an Air France flight from Venezuela; the largest cocaine seizure in France's history. Three members of the Anti-Drug National Command were later linked to the event and brought to court in Venezuela.
