= General Counterintelligence Office =

Military counterintelligence agency in Venezuela (defunct)

The General Counterintelligence Office was the military counterintelligence agency of Venezuela.

According to the New York Times, the agency was replaced by the Dirección de Inteligencia Militar in 2008.
