= Presidential Honor Guard (Venezuela) =

- Guardia de Honor Presidencial de Venezuela
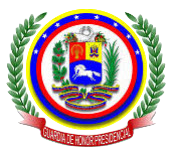
- Active: 12 February 1812
- Allegiance: Venezuela
- Branch: Bolivarian National Armed Forces of Venezuela
- Type: Honor guard
- Size: 2,000
- Garrison/HQ: Casa Militar

Commanders
- President of Venezuela: Delcy Rodríguez
- Minister of the People's Power for Defense: Gustavo González López
- Brigade Commander: Henry Navas Rumbo

The Presidential Honor Guard (PHG) is the military brigade of the Bolivarian National Armed Forces of Venezuela responsible for the immediate security of the president of Venezuela. The current head of the Presidential Honor Guard is Gustavo González López.

== History ==
The Presidential Honor Guard was first created in Santa Cruz de Mompox by Simón Bolivar. The structure was followed years later due to the need of rulers to maintain the presidency of Venezuela, as well as to safeguard the institutions of Venezuela. The beginning of the institution dates back to 10 March 1810, when the Caracas Supreme Board recommends creating an armed body for the safekeeping and custody of Congress, configuring it on 9 March 1811, when a company called National Guard was created. In July 1811, a Rural Service is also attributed to protect landowners and prevent theft and crime.

On 12 February 1812, the Presidential Honor Guard was formally created by Bolivar himself as a guard unit that would serve as his personal escort to the battlefield. Its uniforms mirror the ones used today by the current guard.

The current Presidential Honor Guard Brigade's lineage dates to 1958, during the presidency of Rómulo Betancourt, when what was then the Presidential Honor Guard Regiment was raised as part of the National Armed Forces, but reporting directly to the Presidential office in his capacity as Commander in Chief of the armed services.

It was restructured in 2015 due to increasing crime and violence alongside the Special Brigade for Presidential Protection and Security and the Special Security and Protection Unit for State Personalities.

Due to the PHG's failure in protecting Nicolás Maduro from being captured by Delta Force during the 2026 United States strikes in Venezuela, General Javier Marcano Tábata was removed from his post as commander.

== Organization ==
Currently, the Presidential Honor Guard is a brigade-sized unit and has 2,000 members. The brigade is made up of military personnel from the five branches of the National Bolivarian Armed Forces of Venezuela and specialized members of the Bolivarian National Intelligence Service (SEBIN), in addition to the Corps of Scientific, Criminal and Criminal Investigations (CICPC), Bolivarian National Police (CNB), and personnel from different state police departments of Venezuela, according to the specialties required to ensure the operational effectiveness of the Presidential Honor Guard. This unit is commanded by a general or flag officer, according to the provisions of the President of Venezuela, who, as Commander-in-Chief of the Armed Forces, appoints and relieves its commander.

== Commanders ==
- Carlos Alcalá Laces (-2006)
- Iván Hernández Dala (September 2015 - October 2024)
- Javier Marcano Tábata (October 2024 - January 2026)
- Gustavo González López (January 2026 - March 2026)

== Operations ==
=== Security ===
The Presidential Honor Guard conducts operations required for the maintenance of the internal order of the country, cooperate in the development of the military operations required to ensure the defense of the national command will exercise the activities of administrative police and criminal investigation attributed by law, as well as actively participate in national development, in the territory and other geographical areas of the Bolivarian Republic of Venezuela.

=== Ceremonial ===
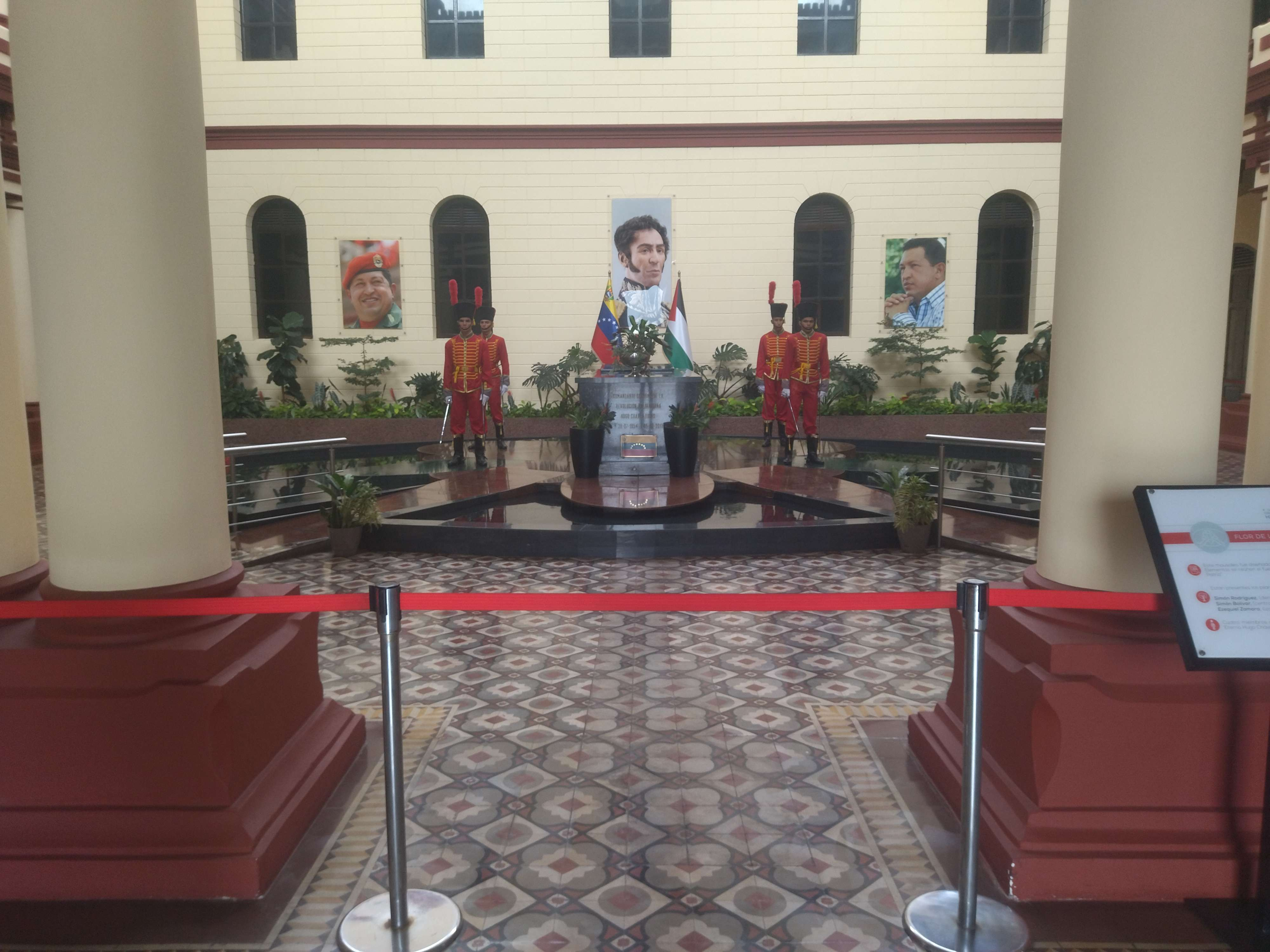
Presidential Honor Guard at the tomb of Hugo Chávez

The brigade provides the honor guard to the president of Venezuela in State Arrival Ceremonies at the Miraflores Palace and to the president in every activity held in the grounds and at the Tomb of the Unknown Soldier in Carabobo Field, Valencia Municipality, Carabobo, in honor of the organization's participation in one of the final two battles of the Venezuelan War of Independence, the Battle of Carabobo on 24 June 1821, fought at the very grounds where the tomb is located, where a Guard Mounting ceremony is held daily in the midday hours. From 2013 onward the Presidential Honor Guard is also charged with mounting the guard at the tomb of the late President Hugo Chávez at Fort Montana in Caracas plus in Bolivar's renovated mausoleum in the National Pantheon of Venezuela, with guard mounting duties done daily, with all of them open to the public.
