= General Directorate of Military Counterintelligence =

Counterintelligence agency of Venezuela

Directorate General of Military Counterintelligence
- Dirección General de Contrainteligencia Militar
- Seal of DGCIM

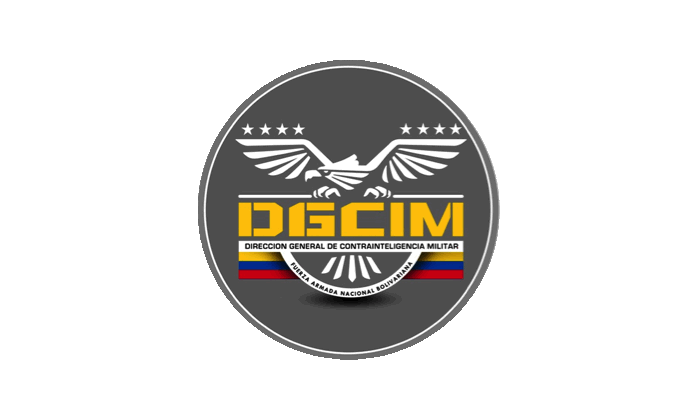
- Flag of DGCIM

Agency overview
- Formed: August 30, 1957
- Headquarters: Boleíta, Sucre, Miranda
- Agency executive: Germán Gómez Lárez
- Parent agency: Ministry of People's Power for Defense
- Website: www.dgim.mil.ve

The General Directorate of Military Counterintelligence (Spanish: Dirección General de Contrainteligencia Militar, DGCIM) is the military counterintelligence agency of Venezuela, whose function is to prevent intelligence or espionage internally and externally by military and civilians.

Following the Abduction of Nicolás Maduro, on 7 January 2026, acting President Delcy Rodríguez appointed Gustavo Enrique González López as the new Commander of the Presidential Honor Guard and Director General of the GDCIM, replacing Major General Javier Marcano Tábata.

== History ==
The agency originates from the Armed Forces Intelligence Services (SIFA), which was signed into service on 30 August 1957.

In 1974, the agency changed its name to the Directorate of Military Intelligence (DIM). On 16 May 1977, the military organization changed its name to the Directorate General of Military Intelligence Sector (DGSIM) and then later changed the name of Directorate General of Military Intelligence (DGIM). Under these names, their operations functioned as military intelligence for the Venezuelan military.

On 21 July 2011, the organization changed its name to the Directorate General of Military Counterintelligence (DGCIM), whose function is no longer military intelligence but counterintelligence.

Surgeon José Alberto Marulanda was arrested on 20 May 2018 by DGCIM officers, the day on which presidential elections were held in Venezuela. During his detention, Marulando was tortured by officials and beaten to the point of becoming deaf in his right ear and losing sensation in his hands. By November 2018, six months after his arrest, his hearing had been postponed six times.

The DGCIM has been targeted by US sanctions in 2019 after Venezuelan Navy Captain Rafael Acosta Arévalo died in DGCIM custody, accused of being involved in a coup plot.

The unit was led by Iván Hernández Dala between January 2014 and October 2024, until he was replaced by Major General Javier Marcano Tábata.

== Training ==
Since 2019, it was reported that Cuba provided assistance in training DGCIM agents.

== Torture centres ==
The DGCIM is known to run a torture centre within its headquarters in Caracas, known as the Casa de los Sueños (English: "House of Dreams").

== See also ==
- Dirección de los Servicios de Inteligencia y Prevención (Directorate of Intelligence and Prevention Services, DISIP)
- General Counterintelligence Office
- Torture in Venezuela
