= Prosecution of Nicolás Maduro and Cilia Flores =

U.S. prosecution of former Venezuelan president

United States v. Maduro et al.
- Court: United States District Court for the Southern District of New York
- Full case name: United States v. Nicolás Maduro Moros, Diosdado Cabello Rondón, Ramón Rodríguez Chacín, Cilia Adela Flores de Maduro, Nicolás Ernesto Maduro Guerra and Hector Rusthenford Guerrero Flores
- Decided: Ongoing
- Docket nos.: 1:11-cr-00205

Case history
- Prior actions: Indictment filed: March 8, 2011; Indictment unsealed: March 26, 2020
- Subsequent actions: Guilty pleas by Clíver Alcalá (2023) and Hugo Carvajal (2025)

Court membership
- Judges sitting: Alvin Hellerstein (until 28 October 2026); Analisa Torres (since 29 October 2026)

United States v. Nicolás Maduro Moros et al., (Note: fully: United States v. Nicolás Maduro Moros, Diosdado Cabello Rondón, Ramón Rodríguez Chacín, Cilia Adela Flores de Maduro, Nicolás Ernesto Maduro Guerra and Hector Rusthenford Guerrero Flores) originally filed under United States v. Carvajal-Barrios, is a federal criminal case filed against former president of Venezuela Nicolás Maduro, and various senior Venezuelan officials by the United States Department of Justice (DOJ) in the United States District Court for the Southern District of New York in 2011 and unsealed on March 26, 2020. The indictment alleged that Maduro and his associates conspired with Colombian guerrilla groups to traffic cocaine into the United States as part of what U.S. authorities termed a narcoterrorism conspiracy.

The indictment initially included Hugo Carvajal, who was arrested in Spain in 2021 and extradited to the United States on a warrant for drug trafficking in 2014. Carvajal pleaded guilty in June 2025. Clíver Alcalá Cordones, who was also indicted, surrendered to U.S. agents in Colombia and, in 2023, pleaded guilty to providing aid to the Colombian Revolutionary Armed Forces of Colombia (FARC).

On January 3, 2026, a superseding indictment was unsealed after Maduro and his wife, Cilia Flores, were captured during a U.S. military operation in Caracas supported by the DOJ and Central Intelligence Agency (CIA). Maduro and Flores were transported to the United States and taken into federal custody in New York City, and are currently detained at the Metropolitan Detention Center in Brooklyn. They have pleaded not guilty.

Maduro and Flores were set to return to court on June 30, 2026, but a judge delayed their return to court until July 22, 2026.

On July 22, 2026, Judge Alvin Hellerstein set the trial date for June 1, 2027, at the request of lawyers on both sides.

== Background ==
Venezuela was identified by the United Nations Office on Drugs and Crime in 2011 as a major cocaine transit country from Colombia to North America and Europe.

On November 18, 2016, Franqui Francisco Flores de Freitas and Efrain Antonio Campo Flores, both nephews of Cilia Flores, were found guilty after their arrest in Haiti for cocaine smuggling. They were sentenced on December 14, 2017, to 18 years in a U.S. federal prison.

== Indictment ==
On March 26, 2020, US Attorney General William Barr announced charges against Nicolas Maduro and several others in the Venezuelan leadership, which he called a "cesspit of corruption". Barr alleged Maduro was working with the Revolutionary Armed Forces of Colombia (FARC) to smuggle cocaine to the United States. The charges were filed primarily in the United States District Court for the Southern District of New York (SDNY), with related cases in the District of Columbia and the Southern District of Florida.

The only other sitting heads of state to be criminally charged by U.S. prosecutors were Panama's Manuel Noriega and Libya's Muammar Gaddafi.

In a virtual press conference, United States Attorney General William Barr described Venezuela under Maduro's rule as a country "plagued by criminality and corruption". He accused Maduro and his allies of conspiring with the FARC to ship tons of cocaine into the United States to "wage a health war on American citizens".

According to prosecutors, Venezuelan leaders and the FARC faction organized an "air bridge" from Venezuelan military airbases to Central America and a parallel maritime route through the Caribbean. These operations allegedly moved hundreds of tons of cocaine annually and generated billions of dollars in illicit revenue for both the guerrilla groups and Venezuela's ruling elite.

The indictment included charges of narco-terrorism, conspiracy to commit narco-terrorism, drug trafficking, money laundering, and corruption. Prosecutors alleged that Maduro and his associates directed Venezuelan military and intelligence resources to protect cocaine shipments, provide armed escorts for flights, and allow clandestine airstrips to be used for trafficking operations. Some defendants were also accused of arranging weapons transfers to FARC in exchange for drugs, thereby tying the conspiracy to both narcotics and armed conflict.

Hours after the announcement, the United States Department of State offered a reward of $15 million for information leading to Maduro's arrest and up to $10 million for several of his top associates. The indictment was unsealed the same day it was filed, and the DOJ released wanted posters for Maduro and other defendants. The decision to go public immediately, despite knowing the defendants were beyond U.S. jurisdiction, was interpreted as both a legal maneuver to strengthen U.S. extradition efforts abroad and a political signal of Washington's intent to escalate pressure on the Venezuelan leadership.

A superseding indictment of January 3, 2026, included the names of Maduro, his wife Cilia Flores, his son Nicolas Maduro Guerra, Venezuelan Interior Minister Diosdado Cabello, former interior minister Ramon Rodriguez Chacin, and the alleged leader of Tren de Aragua, Niño Guerrero.

=== Defendants ===
Court	Defendant(s)	Position/Role	Charges/Allegations	Reward (USD)	Status (as of 2026)
Southern District of New York (SDNY) – Main narco-terrorism indictment
SDNY	Nicolás Maduro Moros	Former President of Venezuela	Accused of leading conspiracy with FARC; authorizing cocaine trafficking routes	50,000,000	Deposed and captured, sent to U.S. (2026); pleaded not guilty (2026); ongoing trial
SDNY	Cilia Adela Flores de Maduro	Former First Lady of Venezuela	Accused of accepting bribes to facilitate drug trafficking; manipulating the anti-drug office of Venezuela	–	Captured, sent to U.S. (2026); pleaded not guilty (2026); ongoing trial
SDNY	Diosdado Cabello Rondón	President of the National Constituent Assembly	Described as ringleader of the Cartel of the Suns	25,000,000	At large in Venezuela
SDNY	Hugo Carvajal Barrios ("El Pollo")	Former head of military intelligence	Coordinated logistics and protection for shipments with FARC	10,000,000	Arrested in Spain (2021); extradited to U.S. (2023); pleaded guilty (2025)
SDNY	Clíver Alcalá Cordones	Retired Venezuelan general	Oversaw military support for drug flights and arms transfers	10,000,000	Surrendered in Colombia (2020); extradited to U.S.; pleaded guilty (2023)
SDNY	Vladimir Padrino López	Minister of Defense	Accused of shielding cartel operations	15,000,000	At large in Venezuela
SDNY	Maikel Moreno	President of the Supreme Tribunal of Justice	Alleged to have provided judicial protection for trafficking networks	5,000,000	At large in Venezuela
Eastern District of New York (EDNY) – Indictments related to cocaine-trafficking conspiracies
EDNY	Néstor Luis Reverol Torres	Former ONA director; ex-National Guard commander	Charged with international cocaine distribution conspiracy (indictment unsealed 2016)	–	At large / not in U.S. custody
EDNY	Vassyly Kotosky Villarroel Ramírez	Captain, Venezuelan National Guard	Alleged use of official vehicles to move multi-ton cocaine loads to ports/airports for U.S. importation	–	At large / status not confirmed
EDNY	Rafael Antonio Villasana Fernández	Officer – Venezuelan National Guard (ret.)	Co-charged with Kotosky; alleged to arrange/escort large cocaine shipments using state vehicles	–	At large / status not confirmed
EDNY	Adriana Zunilde Suppa Peñate	Customs broker ("La Gorda")	Alleged to arrange concealment/shipping of cocaine via Puerto Cabello container traffic	–	At large / status not public
Southern District of Florida (Miami) – Money laundering & corruption cases
S.D. Fl.	Luis Alfredo Motta Domínguez	Former Minister of Electric Power; ex-head of CORPOELEC	Conspiracy to commit money laundering and money laundering tied to bribe-tainted CORPOELEC contracts (2019 indictment)	5,000,000	Fugitive / not apprehended
S.D. Fl.	Various Venezuelan officials and businesspeople	Linked to PDVSA	Alleged laundering of hundreds of millions of dollars through U.S. banks and shell companies; corruption in state oil industry	–	Several prosecuted in Florida courts; others remain at large
Southern District of Texas (Houston) – PDVSA bribery / FCPA cases
S.D. Tex.	Luis Carlos de León Pérez	Former finance director, Electricidad de Caracas (PDVSA affiliate)	Conspiracy to violate the FCPA; conspiracy to commit money laundering (PDVSA vendor kickback scheme)	–	Pleaded guilty (2018); sentenced August 7, 2023
District of Columbia – Corruption and drug-related charges
D.C.	Tareck El Aissami	Vice President for the Economy	Charged with drug trafficking, corruption, and links to FARC	10,000,000	Arrested by Venezuelan prosecutor's office on charges of treason, money laundering and criminal association (2023)
District of Arizona – Arms export / export-control case
D. Ariz.	Guiseppe Luciano Menegazzo Carrasquel	Venezuelan Air Force colonel (dual VE/IT citizen)	Arms-export conspiracy (OV-10 Bronco engines); export-control violations (2010 indictment)	–	Convicted; sentenced to 19 months (Jan. 2025)

== Developments ==
=== Surrender of Clíver Alcalá Cordones in Colombia ===
One day after the indictment was announced, retired Venezuelan general Clíver Alcalá Cordones surrendered to Colombian authorities in Barranquilla and was transferred to the United States. In 2023, Alcalá pleaded guilty to providing material support to a terrorist organization and to illicit arms transfers, while prosecutors dropped broader narcotics charges. His guilty plea marked the first conviction among those indicted in the case and demonstrated the U.S. willingness to pursue prosecutions even when the top defendants remained outside its jurisdiction.

=== Operation Gideon ===
In early May 2020, a failed armed incursion into Venezuela known as Operation Gideon was launched by a group of Venezuelan dissidents and U.S. private security contractors. The mission aimed to capture Maduro and other senior officials and transport them to the United States.

Media investigations and testimonies from those involved indicated that the operation was at least partly motivated by the rewards announced by the U.S. government in March 2020, which offered up to $15 million for information leading to Maduro's arrest and lesser sums for several of his associates.

According to subsequent reports, some participants believed that delivering Maduro to U.S. authorities would secure the bounty and provide international legitimacy for their actions. The Venezuelan government quickly defeated the incursion, killing several participants and arresting dozens more, including two former U.S. special forces soldiers. Maduro cited the incident as proof that the United States was seeking his removal through both legal and covert military means.

=== 2021 arrest of Hugo Carvajal ===
Former intelligence chief Hugo Carvajal initially evaded arrest after fleeing Venezuela in 2019, after breaking ties with Maduro. He was apprehended in Madrid in September 2021 by the National Police Corps following years in hiding. After a lengthy extradition battle in Spanish courts, Carvajal was extradited to the United States in July 2023 and arraigned before the Southern District of New York. He initially pleaded not guilty but, in June 2025, pleaded guilty to narco-terrorism and drug trafficking charges. His plea was considered a major breakthrough for U.S. prosecutors, who had long sought his testimony regarding ties between Venezuelan officials and Colombian guerrilla groups.

=== 2024 presidential election and aftermath ===
The July 2024 presidential election significantly intensified international pressure on Nicolás Maduro's government. Opposition candidate Edmundo González claimed victory based on precinct-level tallies and independent monitoring, while the government-controlled National Electoral Council (CNE) declared Maduro the winner. The disputed outcome triggered nationwide protests, which were met with repression by Venezuelan security forces.

The United States, the European Union, and several Latin American governments, including Brazil, Colombia, and Chile, denounced the election as fraudulent and refused to recognize the CNE's declaration of Maduro's victory. They cited reports of voting irregularities, the disqualification of opposition candidates, intimidation of voters, and concerns raised by international observers. Human rights organizations further documented arbitrary arrests and violent repression of protesters in the aftermath. Despite widespread condemnation, Maduro was inaugurated on January 10, 2025, for a third term. His swearing-in deepened Venezuela's political crisis, worsened relations with democratic governments across the region, and led to the imposition of additional international sanctions. The disputed election also galvanized the opposition, which continued to call for a transitional government and renewed international mediation efforts.

That same day, the U.S. State Department announced that the reward against Maduro was increased from $15 million to $25 million. National Security Council spokesperson John Kirby said the decision was part of "a concerted message of solidarity with the Venezuelan people," intended "to further elevate international efforts to maintain pressure on Maduro and his representatives." Secretary of State Antony Blinken reiterated that the United States "does not recognize Nicolás Maduro as the president of Venezuela." At the same time, U.S. Treasury Under Secretary Bradley Smith added that Washington stood with its "likeminded partners" in "solidarity with the people's vote for new leadership and rejects Maduro's fraudulent claim of victory."

In addition to the bounty on Maduro, the U.S. government also increased the reward offers for several other senior Venezuelan officials. The reward for Diosdado Cabello, widely regarded as the second-most-powerful figure in the ruling party, was raised from $10 million to $25 million. Similarly, a $15 million reward was announced for Defense Minister Vladimir Padrino López, reflecting Washington's accusations that he played a central role in enabling drug trafficking and maintaining the regime's grip on power.

=== Asset seizures ===
As part of its enforcement efforts, the United States targeted assets allegedly linked to Maduro. In September 2024, U.S. authorities seized a Dassault Falcon 900EX jet that prosecutors said had been purchased through shell companies to evade sanctions. The aircraft, intercepted in the Dominican Republic and later flown to Fort Lauderdale, Florida, was presented as evidence of how Venezuela's leadership used front companies to conceal illicit financial transactions.

=== Capture of Maduro and transfer to U.S. custody ===
On January 3, 2026, during U.S. military strikes on Venezuelan targets as part of Operation Absolute Resolve, U.S. special forces captured Nicolás Maduro and his wife, Cilia Flores, at a residence in Caracas. The couple was initially transferred to the USS Iwo Jima and subsequently flown to the U.S., arriving at Stewart Air National Guard Base on the same day. Maduro was taken into federal custody to face the 2020 narco-terrorism charges in the Southern District of New York, with an initial court appearance scheduled for the following week. U.S. Attorney General Pam Bondi confirmed that both Maduro and Flores faced charges for narco-terrorism conspiracy and cocaine importation conspiracy.

=== First court appearance of Nicolás Maduro and Cilia Flores ===
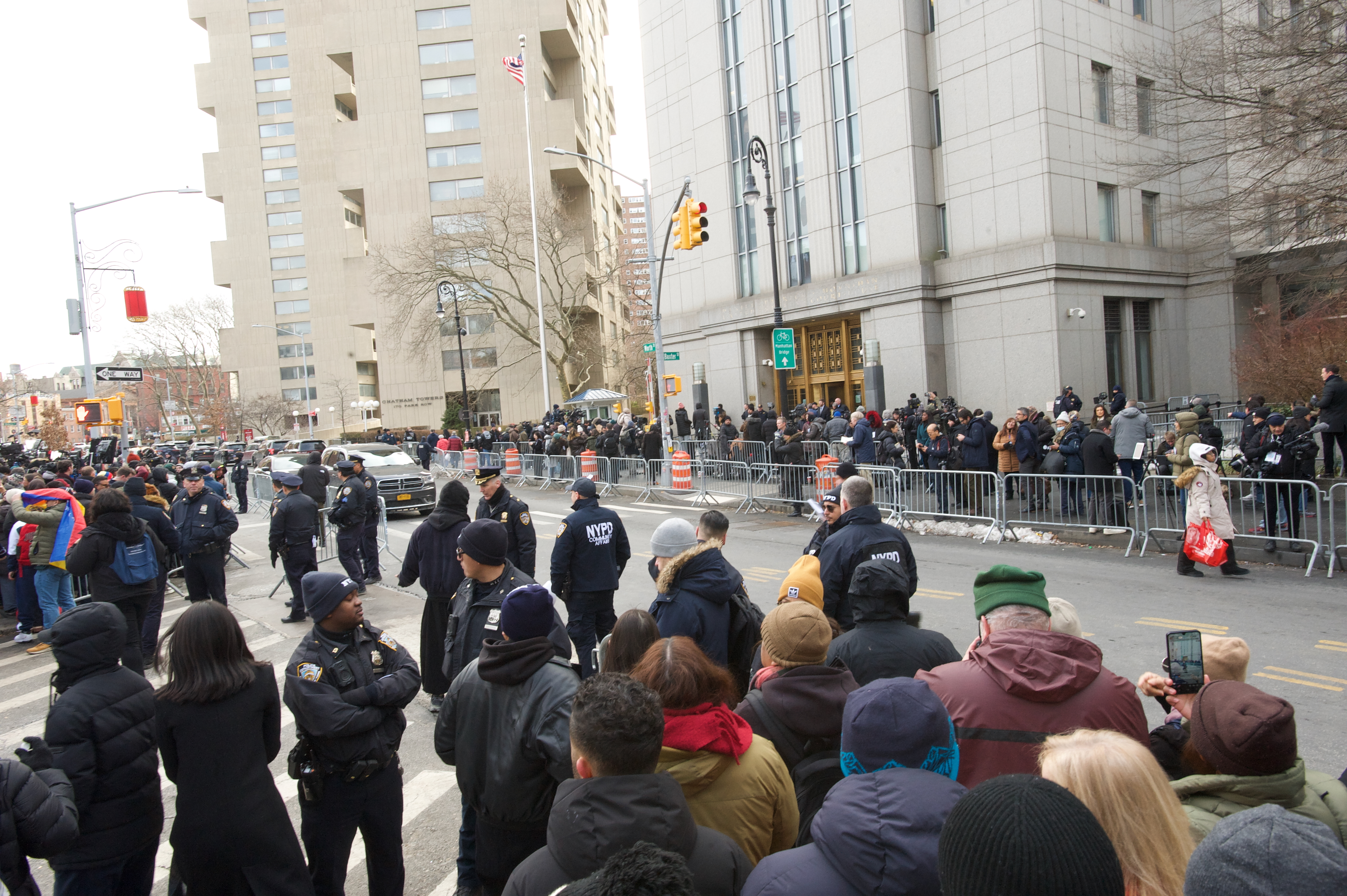
Outside of the courthouse where Maduro was arraigned in New York City, January 5, 2026

On January 5, 2026, Maduro and his wife, Cilia Flores, appeared before U.S. District Judge Alvin Hellerstein. They both entered not guilty pleas to numerous drug trafficking charges. This marked the execution of the outstanding arrest warrant from the 2020 indictment and was a rare instance of a sitting head of state being apprehended by U.S. forces to face domestic criminal charges, drawing comparisons to the 1989 capture of Panamanian leader Manuel Noriega.

Maduro is represented by lawyer Barry Pollack, and Cilia Flores is represented by lawyer Mark Donnelly. Maduro said: "I'm innocent. I'm not guilty — I'm a decent man". Pollack told the court that his client has health issues that will require attention, while Flores's attorney said she may have fractured or severe bruising on her ribs. The next court proceeding was set for March 17. Bruce Fein has also been involved as a lawyer in the case.

Due to U.S. sanctions on Maduro imposed since 2017, the U.S. government will not allow the Venezuelan government to pay for Maduro's legal representation. Pollack said the US Treasury granted an exemption to the sanctions on January 9 but revoked it hours later. Pollack said, "The government of Venezuela has an obligation to pay Mr. Maduro's fees, Mr. Maduro has a legitimate expectation that the government of Venezuela would do so, and Mr. Maduro cannot otherwise afford counsel." According to Pollack, Flores may still receive government funds to cover her legal fees.

=== Second court appearance of Maduro and Flores ===
On March 26, 2026, Maduro and Flores attended another hearing and returned to jail. Maduro and Flores were set to return to court on June 30, 2026.

=== Death of Niño Guerrero ===
In early June 2026, a military operation was carried out to kill Héctor Rusthenford Guerrero Flores, known as Niño Guerrero, the leader of the Venezuelan criminal gang Tren de Aragua. Guerrero was one of the co-defendants named in the same indictment as Maduro. U.S. President Donald Trump announced that Guerrero was killed in an airstrike on June 12 in Venezuela conducted in coordination with Venezuelan authorities. Venezuelan officials confirmed their participation in the operation.

=== Third court appearance of Maduro and Flores ===
The third court appearance for Nicolás Maduro and Cilia Flores ultimately did not take place on June 30, 2026. On June 17, 2026, U.S. District Judge Alvin K. Hellerstein approved a joint request from the prosecution and the defense to postpone the hearing until July 22, 2026. The U.S. Attorneys' Office cited scheduling, transportation, and security logistics as the reasons for the delay, including the heavy demand on law enforcement resources associated with hosting the 2026 FIFA World Cup final in nearby New Jersey.

On July 22, 2026 Nicolás Maduro and Cilia Flores finally appeared for their third court appearance, the hearing only lasted around 15 to 20 minutes and focused mainly on setting the timetable for their U.S. criminal case. Judge Alvin Hellerstein agreed to a June 1, 2027 trial date, while Maduro's defence said it plans to argue that he has sovereign/head-of-state immunity and challenge the legality of his capture. Both Maduro and Flores remained silent during the hearing and continue to plead not guilty to the drug-trafficking and narcoterrorism charges.

=== Next court appearances of Maduro and Flores ===
A November 17 hearing has been scheduled. Trial in federal court is scheduled for June 2027.

On October 28, the judge presiding over the case, Alvin K. Hellerstein, died. The case was reassigned to U.S. District Judge Analisa Torres.

== Indictment in Argentina ==
In Argentina, a case on Maduro's alleged crimes was filed in 2023. The Argentinian court issued an extradition request warrant for Maduro in 2024.

In February 2026, following his capture, Argentina formally requested Maduro's extradition. Argentine federal judge Sebastián Ramos signed a warrant for Maduro for crimes against humanity. Charges include torture, arbitrary detention, and enforced disappearance by the Bolivarian National Intelligence Service (SEBIN). Extradition between Argentina and the United States is possible under a 1997 treaty and must be requested by the Argentine foreign minister.

== Record reward for Nicolás Maduro ==
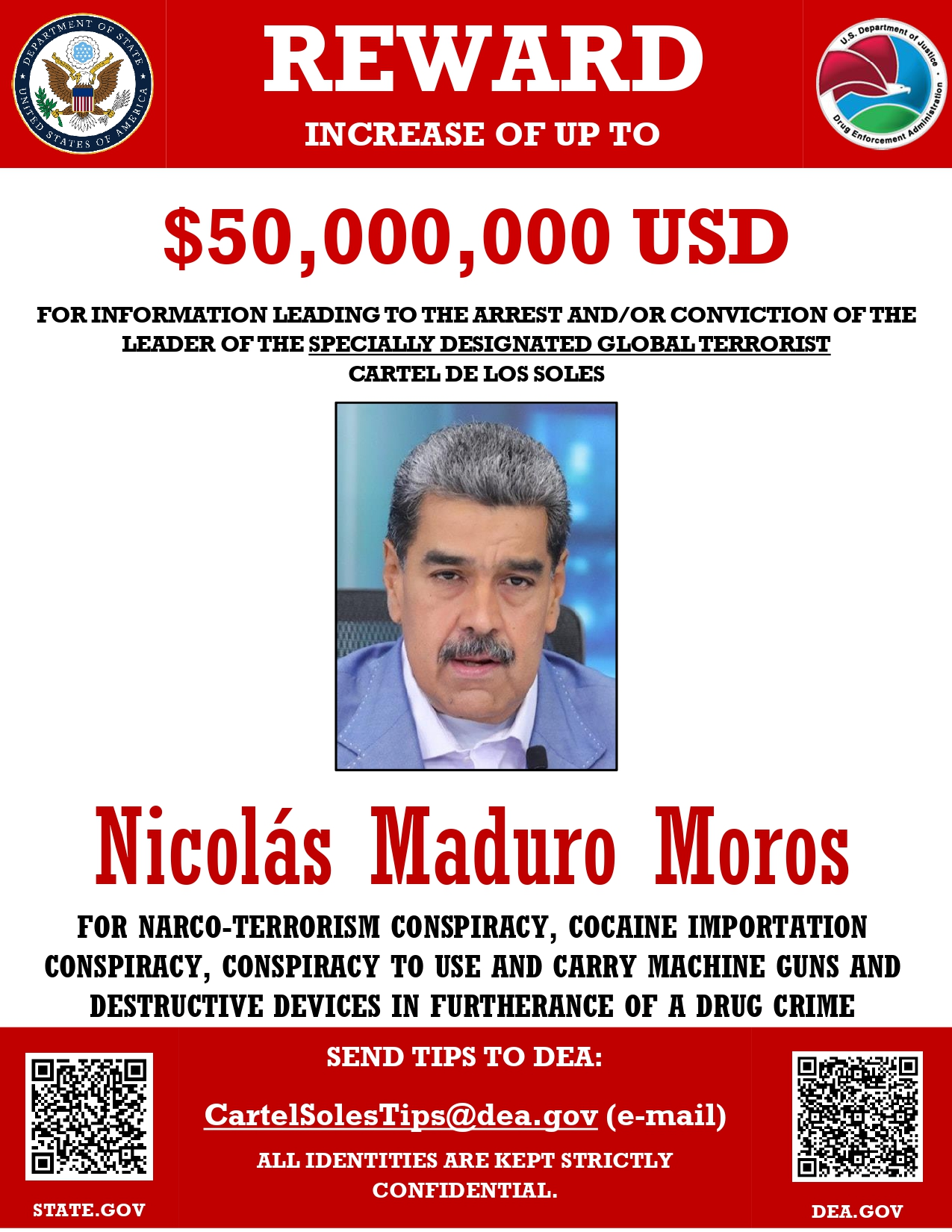
Updated reward poster of Nicolás Maduro, issued just hours after Attorney General Bondi's announcement

On August 7, 2025, the U.S. Department of Justice and the U.S. Department of State announced that the reward for information leading to the arrest and/or conviction of Nicolás Maduro had been increased to $50 million. The figure doubled the earlier bounty of $25 million offered in January 2025 and represented the largest reward ever placed by the United States on a foreign head of state. The reward was revoked after Maduro's capture by U.S. forces.

Former U.S. Attorney General Pam Bondi accused Maduro of collaborating with foreign terrorist and criminal organizations, including the Tren de Aragua, the Sinaloa Cartel, and the Cartel of the Suns, to bring deadly violence into the United States. The claim against Tren de Aragua contradicted a U.S. intelligence assessment that found no evidence of widespread coordination between Maduro and TDA.

In a video message, Bondi described Maduro as one of the "world's most notorious narco-traffickers" and a "threat to national security," declaring that under Trump's leadership, "Maduro will not escape justice, and he will be held accountable for his despicable crimes." She also provided the public with a hotline number to report tips to the Drug Enforcement Administration.

On August 14, 2025, Bondi told Rachel Campos-Duffy of Fox News that the DOJ had seized approximately $700 million in assets linked to Maduro. These assets allegedly included multiple luxury homes in Florida, a mansion in the Dominican Republic, private jets, vehicles, a horse farm, jewelry, and large sums of cash. Bondi described Maduro's government as an "organized crime operation" that continued to function despite the seizures.

After the capture of Nicolás Maduro, U.S. Secretary of State Marco Rubio added that no one would receive the reward. Rubio said, "He is a fugitive of the American justice with a $50 million reward. I guess we're saving $50 million now," to which Trump replied, "Don't let anybody claim it. Nobody deserves it but us."

=== Comparison of U.S. rewards for foreign figures ===
Name	Position/Role	Reward (US$)	Program	Status
Nicolás Maduro	President of Venezuela	50,000,000	Narcotics Rewards Program	Highest reward ever offered for a foreign head of state (2025); captured in Caracas, Venezuela by the United States Armed Forces in Operation Absolute Resolve (2026).
Osama bin Laden	Leader of al-Qaeda	25,000,000	Rewards for Justice	Killed in 2011 during U.S. raid in Abbottabad, Pakistan.
Abu Bakr al-Baghdadi	Leader of ISIS	25,000,000	Rewards for Justice	Detonated a suicide belt in 2019 during a U.S. special forces raid in Syria.
Ayman al-Zawahiri	Successor to bin Laden, al-Qaeda leader	25,000,000	Rewards for Justice	Killed in 2022 U.S. drone strike in Kabul, Afghanistan.
Rafael Caro Quintero	Mexican drug lord, Guadalajara Cartel	20,000,000	Narcotics Rewards Program	Captured in Mexico (2022) after release in 2013; extradited to U.S. (2025).
Shahram Poursafi	IRGC operative from Iran	20,000,000	Rewards for Justice	Accused of plotting assassination of former U.S. National Security Advisor John Bolton (2022); remains at large in Iran.
Ismael "El Mayo" Zambada	Leader of the Sinaloa Cartel	15,000,000	Narcotics Rewards Program	Captured in the U.S. in 2024; previously considered one of the most powerful living cartel bosses.
Pablo Escobar	Leader of the Medellín Cartel	10,000,000	Narcotics Rewards Program	Killed in 1993 by Colombian security forces with U.S. assistance.
Joaquín "El Chapo" Guzmán	Leader of the Sinaloa Cartel	5,000,000	Narcotics Rewards Program	Captured in Mexico (2016), extradited to U.S. (2017), convicted (2019).
Manuel Noriega	Military ruler of Panama	1,000,000	Rewards for Justice	Captured by U.S. forces in 1989 during the invasion of Panama; convicted in U.S. court.

=== Reactions ===
==== Venezuela ====
The Venezuelan government strongly condemned the U.S. decision to raise the bounty on Nicolás Maduro to $50 million. Foreign Minister Yván Gil dismissed the announcement as a "crude political propaganda operation," claiming it was intended to distract from U.S. domestic controversies. Vice President Delcy Rodríguez called Attorney General Pam Bondi's remarks "shameless" and a "ridiculous and cheap show," going further by suggesting that Bondi was "not in her right mind" due to pressure over the Jeffrey Epstein client list.

Maduro responded defiantly in a Cadena nacional broadcast, in which he dared Trump to attempt arrest and warned Venezuela's retaliation could lead to the "end of the American empire." He accused Washington of waging psychological warfare against Venezuela and framed the bounty increase as proof that the country was "winning the global battle against imperialism."

The announcement also sparked coordinated propaganda campaigns across Venezuela. State-controlled media portrayed the bounty increase as proof of U.S. "desperation" and framed it as part of Washington's long-standing efforts to destabilize the country. Pro-government rallies were organized in Caracas and other major cities, where demonstrators carried banners reading "Trump Hands Off Venezuela" and voiced support for Maduro's leadership. In a show of defiance, Maduro ordered military exercises in coastal states, presenting them as a symbolic demonstration of sovereignty and warning foreign adversaries that Venezuela would "defend every inch of its territory."

The National Assembly, dominated by Maduro loyalists, also issued a formal resolution condemning the U.S. decision. Assembly president Jorge Rodríguez described the reward increase as an illegal and desperate attempt to undermine Maduro and the Venezuelan people, emphasizing that lawmakers unanimously rejected the measure. Rodríguez, who also serves as the government's chief negotiator in talks with the U.S., argued that neither sanctions nor international pressure would succeed in reversing what he characterized as the popular mandate from the disputed 2024 election that re-elected Maduro.

==== United States ====
In the United States, the announcement drew mixed reactions. Supporters of President Trump framed the increase as a bold step to hold Maduro accountable and highlighted the asset seizures as proof of progress. Critics, however, mocked the reward as redundant, pointing out that "he's in Venezuela" and unlikely to be captured. Social media commentators accused the Trump administration of staging a political distraction from domestic controversies, particularly the Jeffrey Epstein client list, which was dominating headlines at the time.

The Justice and State Departments defended the decision, stressing that the increased bounty was part of the long-standing Narcotics Rewards Program and consistent with U.S. counter-narcotics and counterterrorism policy. Attorney General Pam Bondi argued that Maduro's alleged cooperation with international criminal networks justified extraordinary measures. Secretary of State Marco Rubio described the move as part of Washington's broader pressure strategy, intended to further isolate Maduro diplomatically and encourage defections within his government.

In Congress, Republican lawmakers strongly supported the announcement. Representative Byron Donalds described the reward increase as a necessary step to hold Maduro accountable for "narco-terrorism" and corruption. Earlier in 2025, Senators Ted Cruz, Rick Scott, and Bill Cassidy had introduced the STOP MADURO Act, which sought to raise the maximum potential reward for Maduro's arrest and conviction to $100 million.

Democratic leaders did not comment directly on the $50 million reward, but had previously emphasized support for Venezuelans during the January 2025 increase to $25 million under former President Biden. In a joint statement, several Democratic foreign policy leaders in Congress condemned Maduro's authoritarianism while urging bipartisan cooperation to support the Venezuelan people.

== Reactions to initial indictment in 2020 ==
=== Venezuela ===
In 2020, the Venezuelan government immediately denounced the indictments as an act of "imperialist aggression." Nicolás Maduro described the charges as a "fabricated plot" by Washington to justify regime change and destabilize Venezuela. In televised remarks, Maduro accused the Trump administration of using narcotics charges as a political weapon and vowed he would "never surrender to threats."

Foreign Minister Jorge Arreaza dismissed the indictment in March 2020 as "a new form of coup attempt," arguing that the U.S. was exploiting the global COVID-19 crisis to tighten pressure on Caracas. The Supreme Tribunal of Justice also rejected the legal validity of the charges, declaring that Maduro enjoyed immunity as head of state.

Reactions among the Venezuelan opposition varied. Opposition leader Juan Guaidó, who was recognized at the time by the United States and several other governments as the interim president, welcomed the indictments as evidence that "the world is finally holding Maduro and his accomplices accountable." However, some civil society groups and humanitarian organizations warned that the timing of the charges risked complicating cooperation on urgent health and food needs during the pandemic.

=== United States ===
In 2020, U.S. officials framed the indictments as part of a broader "maximum pressure" strategy against Maduro. Then-Attorney General William Barr accused Venezuelan officials of conspiring with the FARC to "flood the United States with cocaine". He described the Maduro government as "plagued by criminality and corruption." The State Department announced a reward of up to US$15 million for information leading to the arrest of Maduro, under the Narcotics Rewards Program.

Barr and other senior officials compared the case to earlier prosecutions of foreign leaders, notably former Panamanian ruler Manuel Noriega, who was convicted of drug trafficking in the United States after his overthrow in 1989.

=== International ===
==== International organizations ====
- European Union − EU officials acknowledged the seriousness of the allegations but urged restraint, stressing the importance of maintaining humanitarian access and encouraging political dialogue in Venezuela.
- OAS − Luis Almagro, Secretary General of the Organization of American States, welcomed the indictments as a "necessary step" against impunity and argued that they demonstrated the need for accountability at the highest levels of government.
- United Nations − A spokesperson for Secretary-General António Guterres said the UN would not comment on judicial actions by individual states but reiterated the need to prioritize humanitarian cooperation, particularly in light of the COVID-19 pandemic.

== See also ==
- Corruption in Venezuela
- Illegal drug trade in Venezuela
- Ker–Frisbie doctrine
- Proposed United States invasion of Venezuela
- United States–Venezuela relations

=== Similar events ===
- Trial of Manuel Noriega
- Trial of Saddam Hussein
