= Chilean Venezuelans =

Chilenos-venezolanos

Total population
- 12,037 (2011)

Regions with significant populations
- Miranda State: 2,744
- Bolívar State: 1,947
- Capital District: 1,334
- Carabobo State: 1,297

Languages
- Chilean Spanish · Venezuelan Spanish

Religion
- Roman Catholic

Related ethnic groups
- Chilean diaspora

Chilean Venezuelans are Venezuelans of Chilean descent or Chileans who have obtained Venezuelan citizenship. This migratory flow was one of the main destinations for exiles from the Pinochet dictatorship, at which time approximately 80,000 people came to Venezuela, in addition to professional migrants motivated by the oil boom occurred between 1950 and 1980.

In 2011, the Miranda State was the state with the highest concentration of Chileans (2,744 in total), followed by the Bolívar State (1,947 in total) and the Capital District (1,334 in total). Several activities are carried out within the Chilean communities of Venezuela, such as the 1973 coup d'état commemoration and the celebration of native land holidays.

== Notable people ==
=== Chilean immigrants in Venezuela ===
- Isabel Allende, writer (she lived in Venezuela between 1975 and 1988)
- Jaime Castillo Velasco, lawyer and politician
- Pedro Cunill Grau, geographer
- Beto Cuevas, singer
- Mariano Díaz, photographer
- Miriam Fletcher, journalist
- Miro Popic, journalist and gastronomer
- Jorge Rigo, singer and composer

=== Venezuelans descendants of Chileans ===
- George Forsyth, footballer
- Gregorio González Nicolini, filmmaker and financial analyst
- Jorge Valdivia, footballer

== See also ==
- Chile–Venezuela relations
- Tarapacá migrant crisis
- Chilean diaspora
- Immigration to Venezuela
