= Ronald Ojeda =

Venezuelan military officer (1991–2024)

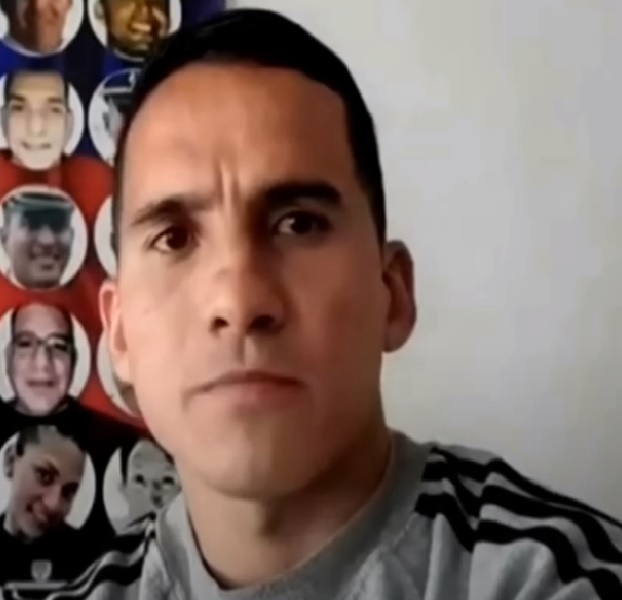
- Born: Ronald Leandro Ojeda Moreno; September 2, 1991; Maracay, Venezuela
- Disappeared: February 21, 2024; Independencia, Santiago Metropolitan Region, Chile
- Died: February 2024 (aged 32)
- Cause of death: Homicide by mechanical asphyxiation
- Body discovered: Maipú, Santiago Metropolitan Region, Chile
- Occupation: Army officer
- Spouse: Josmarghy Castillo Cuberos
- Children: 1
- Military career
- Education: Military Academy of Venezuela
- Branch: Bolivarian Army of Venezuela
- Rank: Lieutenant

Ronald Leandro Ojeda Moreno (September 2, 1991 – February 2024) was a Venezuelan army lieutenant and political dissident who opposed the government of Nicolás Maduro. Imprisoned in Venezuela on charges of rebellion and treason, he escaped in 2017, fled the country, and was granted political asylum in Chile in 2023.

On February 21, 2024, Ojeda was abducted from his apartment in Santiago by men posing as Chilean investigative police. His body was found on March 1, dismembered and buried under concrete in the commune of Maipú. Chilean prosecutors attributed the crime to a faction of the Tren de Aragua known as "Los Piratas de Aragua" and have argued that it was politically motivated and ordered from Venezuela. They have named Venezuelan politician Diosdado Cabello as the alleged instigator, which he denies. The case strained relations between Chile and Venezuela and led Chile to refer information to the International Criminal Court.

Dozens of people have been investigated, and suspects have been extradited to Chile from Costa Rica, Colombia and the United States. On October 1, 2026, a Chilean court convicted the first defendant to stand trial, Maickel Villegas, of kidnapping resulting in death, but found that a political motive had not been established in that proceeding; prosecutors said that question remained open for later trials of the group's leaders.

== Early life and military career ==
Ronald Leandro Ojeda Moreno was born on September 2, 1991, in Maracay, Venezuela, to a low-income family. Ojeda was one of seven siblings. His brother, Germán Alexander Ojeda Moreno, is an army general in the Bolivarian Army of Venezuela.

In 2008, Ojeda enrolled at the Military Academy of Venezuela, and he graduated as an infantry lieutenant in 2012. He later joined a special forces unit in San Cristóbal. Ojeda openly criticized the Venezuelan government, claiming to have conducted independent intelligence work targeting high-ranking officers involved in corruption.

== Imprisonment and escape in Venezuela ==
Ojeda and a fellow officer, José Rodríguez, were repeatedly detained and accused of being part of the "Espada de Dios" conspiracy, charged with military rebellion, incitement to rebellion, and treason. Both said they were tortured by the Venezuelan military counterintelligence agency. During his imprisonment at Ramo Verde Prison in Los Teques, Ojeda befriended fellow detainee Eduardo Figueroa Marchena, a former aviation lieutenant.

In April 2017, Ojeda was arrested again and accused of rebellion and treason. The charges followed his involvement with the Movement for Liberty and Democracy, which had signed a document rejecting Maduro as commander-in-chief of the Bolivarian National Armed Forces. Ojeda said he was tortured during this detention.

On November 30, 2017, Ojeda and eight other officers escaped during a transfer from a military court back to Ramo Verde. According to an account published in La Tercera, the officers disarmed their guards and took the vehicle; local police from Los Salias opened fire, and four of the officers were recaptured. One escapee, Rafael Arreaza, was killed in the shootout, and another, Luis Mogollón, was severely injured. Five officers, including Ojeda, reached Lima, Peru, where they sought refuge, and later settled in Chile.

== Exile in Chile ==
In August 2018, Ojeda and his wife moved from Peru to Chile, first settling in Quillota, in the Valparaíso Region, with relatives who were already living there. That year, the Maduro government issued a decree stripping 24 military officers, including Ojeda, of their rank and expelling them from the armed forces without trial. In November 2022, Ojeda gained public attention when he protested in front of La Moneda Palace in Santiago with a bag over his head, demanding the release of political prisoners and condemning dialogue between the Maduro government and the opposition.

In November 2023, Ojeda was granted political asylum in Chile. In early 2024, Venezuelan authorities again described him as a "traitor to the homeland" and accused him of involvement in an alleged conspiracy. After the killing, Chilean media reported that Ojeda had traveled to Colombia in December 2023 and published an audio recording in which he appeared to discuss a clandestine plan against Maduro, which the outlet said he was pursuing while arranging to seek refuge in Spain.

== Kidnapping and murder ==
=== Background ===
On January 18, 2024, Chile and Venezuela signed an agreement on cooperation against transnational organized crime, following a visit to Caracas by Chilean Undersecretary of the Interior Manuel Monsalve. Six days later, Venezuela's armed forces announced the expulsion of 33 military personnel accused of taking part in alleged conspiracies; the list reportedly included Ojeda.

=== Abduction ===
At about 3 a.m. on February 21, 2024, four men posing as Chilean investigative police arrived outside the Ojeda family's apartment building in Independencia. Presenting the doorman with a false warrant, three of the men entered the building wearing tactical gear. They used a battering ram to break into Ojeda's 14th-floor apartment and abducted him at gunpoint in front of his wife and son.

Chile's Interior Ministry confirmed the kidnapping that day, ordered tighter border controls and asked Interpol to issue an alert. On February 22, the government filed a criminal complaint (querella) in the case.

=== Discovery of the body ===
Following an anonymous tip to prosecutors, Ojeda's body was found on March 1, 2024, dismembered and buried in a suitcase under a concrete slab during a raid in the Vicente Reyes informal settlement in Maipú. The remains lay in a trench about 1.4 meters (4.6 ft) deep. Preliminary autopsy results indicated death by mechanical asphyxiation between seven and ten days before the discovery, rather than by gunshot.

== Investigation ==
The case involved multiple arrests and extradition requests and had significant political and diplomatic repercussions between Chile and Venezuela.

=== Early theories and motive ===
Investigators initially considered several hypotheses, including a kidnapping for ransom, a gang-related abduction, and foreign intervention. No ransom was demanded, which made the case unusual among kidnappings in Chile. Former Venezuelan police commissioner Iván Simonovis said the operation could have been planned by Venezuela's military counterintelligence agency (DGCIM).

The investigation, led by Chilean prosecutor Héctor Barros, concluded that the crime was politically motivated and was possibly orchestrated by Venezuelan authorities with the involvement of the Tren de Aragua, a Venezuelan criminal organization. Burying the body under cement resembled methods observed in earlier cases linked to the gang in northern Chile. Two suspects, Walter Rodríguez Pérez and Maikel Villegas Rodríguez, were believed to have fled to Venezuela, prompting Chile to request their extradition. Venezuela's government dismissed the Tren de Aragua as a "media fiction."

=== Arrests and extraditions ===
The first arrest came on February 28, 2024: a 17-year-old Venezuelan who allegedly took part in surveillance. As of July 2024, he was the only person in custody. The Chilean Supreme Court granted a writ of amparo in his favor, giving prosecutors 60 more days to advance the investigation.

Arrests abroad followed. Villegas was detained in Costa Rica in July 2024 as he crossed the border toward Panama aboard a bus bound for Nicaragua, and he was extradited to Chile on November 20, 2024. In Colombia, authorities detained four Venezuelans sought by Chile in connection with the case: Dayonis Junior Orozco Castillo (April 2024), Larry Álvarez Núñez, known as "Larry Changa" and described as a co-founder of the Tren de Aragua (July 2024), Carlos Francisco Gómez Moreno, known as "Bobby de Cagua" (December 2024), and Luis Alfredo Carrillo Ortiz, known as "Gocho" (February 2025). Venezuela's attorney general, Tarek William Saab, asked that those detainees be handed over to Venezuela rather than Chile. Colombia's Supreme Court later backed extraditing Larry Changa to Chile, although the transfer was held up by competing legal requests. Orozco, who was also suspected of killing Carabineros lieutenant Emmanuel Sánchez in April 2024, was approved for extradition to Chile in April 2025.

=== "Los Piratas de Aragua" ===
In January 2025, Barros linked the killing to "Los Piratas de Aragua," a faction of the Tren de Aragua operating in Chile, and implicated 16 individuals in Ojeda's killing. The cell's alleged leader in Chile, Rafael Enrique Gámez Salas, known as "El Turko," was arrested in Houston, Texas, on December 30, 2024. Prosecutors also detained a Colombian man, Julio César Iglesias ("Barranquilla"), and a Chilean, Héctor Soto Maureira, who allegedly helped bury the body; prosecutors displayed a photograph of Iglesias with bags of cement at the burial site. Edgar Benítez Rubio, known as "El Fresa," was detained in the United States in February 2025; Barros said he had delivered the blue Chevrolet Spark used in the abduction. In August 2026, a Chilean court ordered pretrial detention for "El Turko" and "Gocho."

=== Alleged Venezuelan state involvement ===
Barros said three witnesses implicated the Maduro government. One detainee alleged that Cabello ordered and financed the murder through a criminal intermediary known as El Niño Guerrero. In a February 2025 hearing, Barros cited the testimony of a protected witness (No. 7) who said that payment for the operation was made in Peru. Chilean police intelligence sources later told the press that they suspected Colonel Alexander Granko Arteaga, a Venezuelan counterintelligence officer, of leading the operation, and Barros asked the U.S. Department of Justice for assistance in obtaining information on his movements. In October 2025, Barros said there were "clear indications" pointing toward Cabello.

On March 28, 2025, Chile's national prosecutor delivered a file on the case to the International Criminal Court. After Maduro was captured by U.S. forces on January 3, 2026, Barros formally asked to question him as a witness, and in March 2026 National Prosecutor Ángel Valencia presented the request to U.S. Attorney General Pam Bondi in Washington. Valencia said the questioning would depend on Maduro's willingness to cooperate.

== Trials ==
The first trial began on September 10, 2026, before Santiago's Second Oral Criminal Court. The sole defendant was Villegas, the first adult defendant extradited and tried in the case. Prosecutors alleged that he conducted surveillance outside Ojeda's building, drove members of the group, and filmed the abduction, and they sought a 20-year sentence. On October 1, the court found him guilty as a perpetrator of kidnapping resulting in death. It said that a political motive had not been established at trial. Barros said that the political-motive question remained an open line of investigation that his office would pursue in later proceedings against the group's leaders, and the family's lawyer, Juan Carlos Manríquez, said the ruling treated a politically motivated commission by a foreign government as plausible. Sentencing was scheduled for October 15, 2026; Villegas's defense said it would appeal. A second trial of 18 defendants, including those accused of carrying out the abduction and hiding the body, was set to begin on October 20, with a further case pending against the group's leaders.

== Reactions ==
The case strained diplomatic relations between Chile and Venezuela. Cabello denied any Venezuelan involvement, telling Chile to "fix your problem there." In June 2024, Saab said Venezuela would send Chile migration records and biometric data on the two main suspects and on Ojeda. In January 2025, in reaction to the prosecutor's findings, then–Interior Minister Carolina Tohá said Chile would appeal to the International Criminal Court if Venezuelan government involvement in the case was confirmed.

== Personal life ==
Ojeda was married to Josmarghy Castillo Cuberos, with whom he had one son.

== Legacy ==
Ojeda left behind manuscripts describing alleged corruption among generals and colonels in the Venezuelan military, which his family intends to publish. The Venezuelan Political Persecuted Exiles Organization (Veppex) created the "Order of the Venezuelan Exile Ronald Ojeda" to recognize Venezuelan exiles who have fought for freedom and democracy in Venezuela.

== See also ==
- Enforced disappearances in Venezuela
- Transnational repression
- Chile–Venezuela relations
- Orlando Letelier
