= Chile–Venezuela relations =

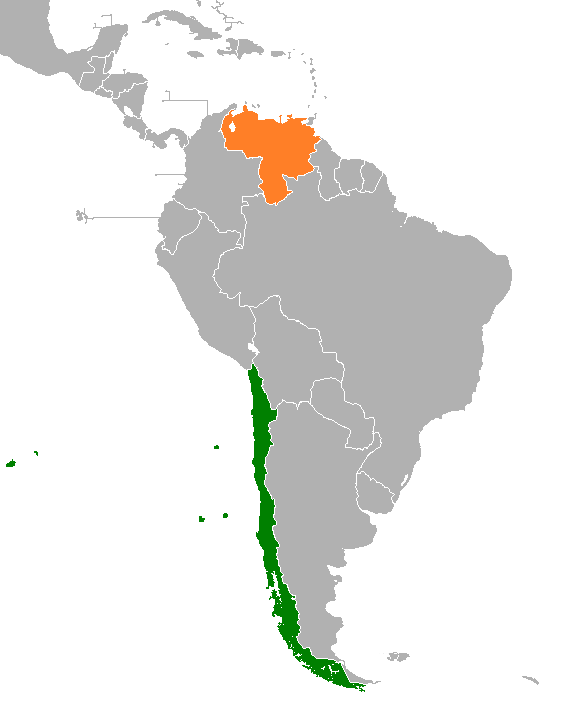
- Chile: Venezuela

Chile–Venezuela relations are the diplomatic relations between the Republic of Chile and the Bolivarian Republic of Venezuela. Both nations are members of the Community of Latin American and Caribbean States, Group of 77, Latin American Integration Association, Organization of American States, Organization of Ibero-American States and the United Nations.

== History ==
Both Chile and Venezuela share a common history in the fact that both nations were once part of the Spanish Empire. During the Spanish colonial period, Chile was then part of the Viceroyalty of Peru and administered from Lima while Venezuela was governed by the Viceroyalty of New Granada in Bogotá. In 1810, both Chile and Venezuela declared their independence from Spain with each nation obtaining independence in 1818 and 1830, respectively. Chilean liberator, Bernardo O'Higgins, while in exile in Peru was encouraged by Venezuelan liberator Simón Bolívar to join the nationalist effort there to free Peru from Spain.

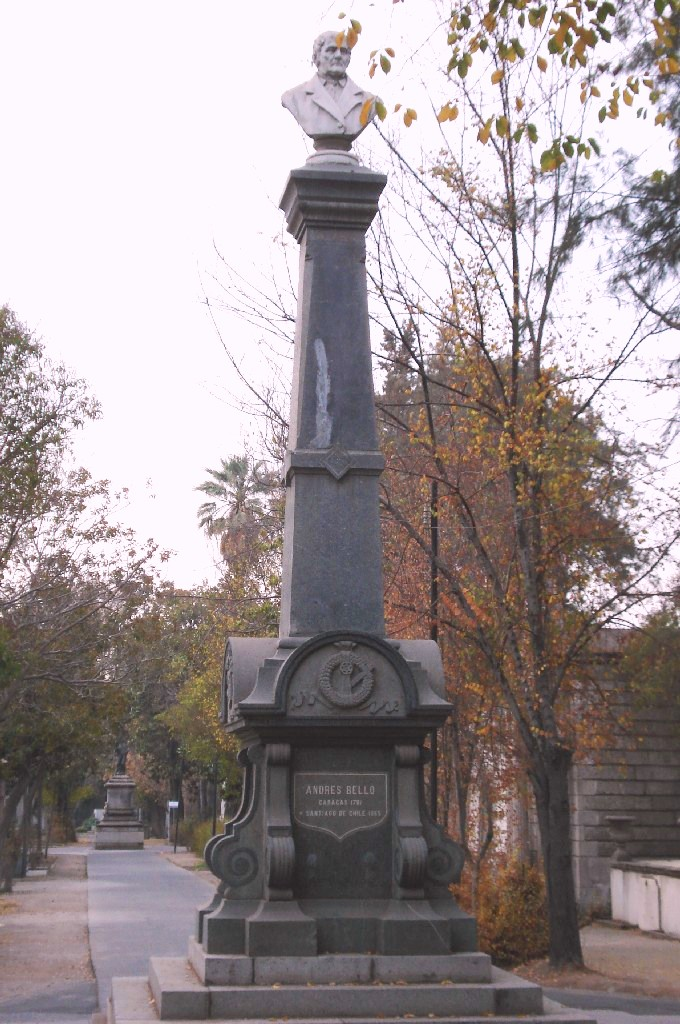
Tomb of Venezuelan humanist and diplomat, Andrés Bello, in Santiago.

In 1858, Chile and Venezuela formally established diplomatic relations. In 1913, Chile established a resident diplomatic legation in Caracas while Venezuela followed suit in 1923 by establishing a diplomatic legation in Santiago. In 1829, Venezuelan humanist and diplomat, Andrés Bello, moved to Chile where he accepted a post in the Chilean Ministry of Foreign Affairs in Santiago. In Chile, Bello became a Senator and founded the University of Chile. Both nations claim Bello as their own and have featured him on the old 2,000 Venezuelan bolívar and the 20,000 Chilean peso notes.

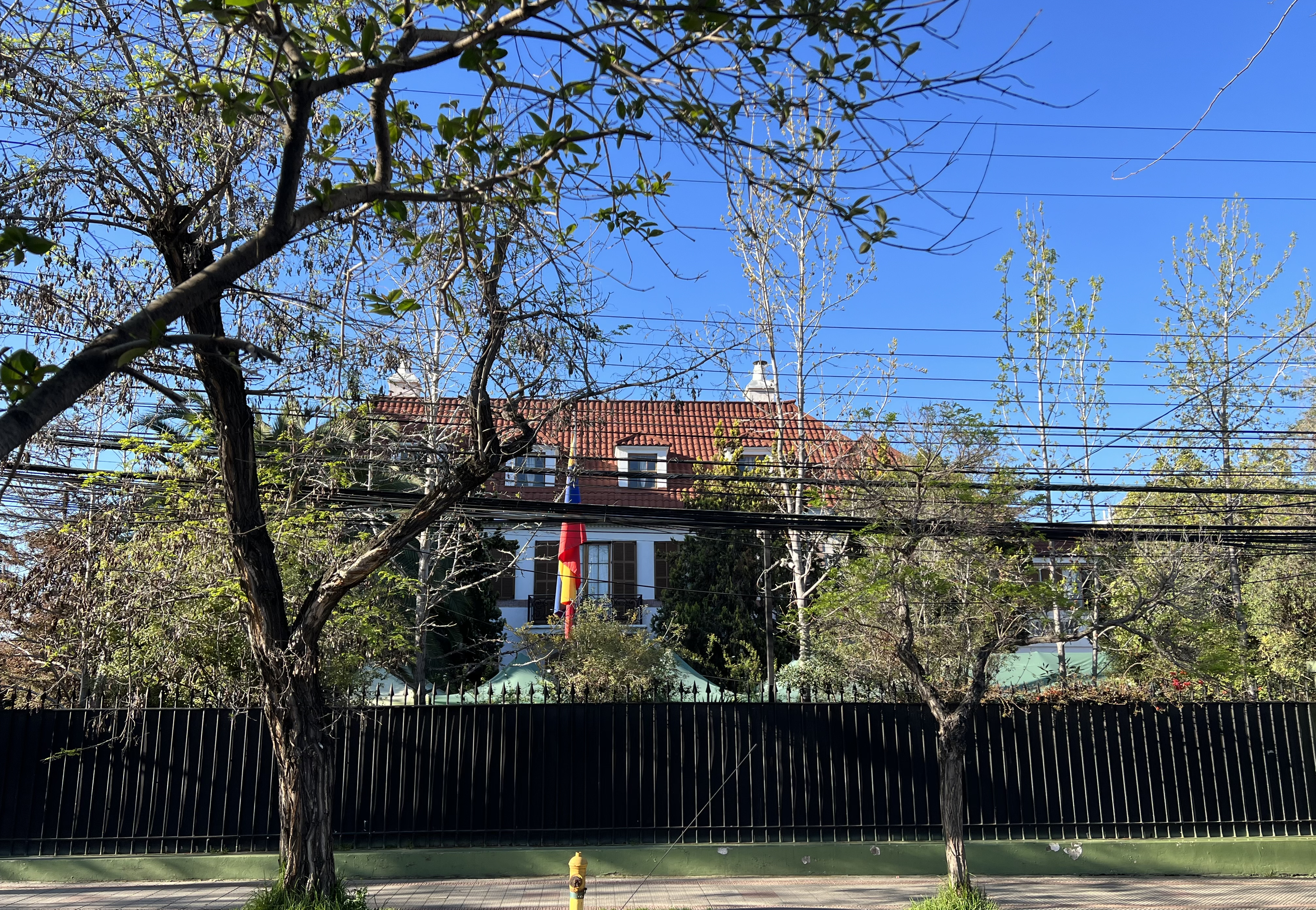
Former embassy of Venezuela in Santiago

In 1973, Chile experienced a coup d'état against the government of President Salvador Allende by General Augusto Pinochet. As a result, approximately 24,000 Chileans sought asylum in Venezuela. Many Chilean refugees returned to Chile in the 1990s after democracy was restored in the country.

In the early 21st century, relations between both nations have been close as both nations worked closely for deeper South American integration. In 1999, Hugo Chávez became President of Venezuela. In 2006, Michelle Bachelet was elected President of Chile. Both leaders maintained a close political relationship as both leaders were part of the "Pink tide" left-wing governments in Latin American democracies. Both countries were founding members of the now defunct Union of South American Nations.

In 2013, Nicolás Maduro became President of Venezuela after the death of President Chávez. Since President Maduro's time in office, the Crisis in Venezuela have reached drastic levels and have contributed to the Venezuelan refugee crisis with over 200,000 Venezuelans immigrating and seeking asylum in Chile. As a result, in June 2019, Chile placed visa restrictions on Venezuelans entering the country. In response, Venezuela imposed visa restrictions on Chilean nationals visiting the country. In January 2019, as a result of the Venezuelan presidential crisis, the Chilean government recognized Juan Guaidó as acting President of Venezuela. In 2023, Chile reinstated a resident-ambassador in Caracas to Maduro's government.

The following year, relations between the countries were strained after Ronald Ojeda, a former venezuelan soldier and political dissident, was murdered in Chile, and on 29 July 2024, Venezuela announced the expulsion of Chile's diplomats to Venezuela after the country refused to recognize Nicolás Maduro as the winner of the presidential elections. As a result, both nations have since closed their respective embassies.

In January 2026, Chilean President-elect José Antonio Kast commented the capture of Venezuelan President Nicolás Maduro by the United States intervention in Venezuela, declaring “the arrest of Nicolás Maduro is great news for the region."

In September 2026, Chilean President José Antonio Kast met with Venezuela's interim President Delcy Rodríguez in New York on the sidelines of the 81st United Nations General Assembly.

== Bilateral agreements ==
Both nations have signed several agreements such as an Extradition treaty (1962); Agreement on Cultural Cooperation (1990); Agreement on Scientific and Technical Cooperation (1990); Agreement on Prevention, Control, Fiscalization and Repression of the Abuse and Illicit Traffic of Narcotic Drugs and Psychotropic Substances (1993); Agreement on the Avoidance of double taxation in relation to international maritime and air transport (1994); Agreement on the Reciprocal Protection of Investments (1994); Agreement on Tourism (1994); and an Agreement on Social Security (2005). On 30 July 2026, following negotiations initiated in March 2026 under Chilean President José Antonio Kast and Venezuelan Acting President Delcy Rodríguez, both countries signed a joint declaration establishing a progressive roadmap to normalize bilateral relations, which had been frozen since July 2024. The initial phase of the agreement reactivates consular services to assist approximately 700,000 Venezuelans residing in Chile and 25,000 Chileans living in Venezuela.

== Trade ==
In 2021, trade between both nations totaled US$65.9 million. Chile's main exports to Venezuela include: lentils, powdered milk, tuna, juices and copper. Venezuela's main exports to Chile include: urea, steel and iron tubes, cables, and steel or iron wires. In 2024, bilateral trade between Venezuela and Chile totaled $123.2 million, with Chile maintaining a $92.4 million trade surplus. Chilean exports to Venezuela reached $108 million, led by processed tomatoes ($15.6 million), processed cereals ($14.5 million), and apples and pears ($13.7 million). Conversely, Venezuelan exports to Chile totaled $15.2 million, led by nitrogenous fertilizers ($6.61 million), carbon ($1.39 million), and baked goods ($1.05 million).

== See also ==
- Chilean Venezuelans
- Tarapacá migrant crisis
- Ronald Ojeda
