= Rísquez =

Notable people with the surname Rísquez include:

- Diego Rísquez (1949-2018), Venezuelan film director.
- Francisco Antonio Rísquez (1856–1941), Venezuelan physician.
- Ronna Rísquez, Venezuelan journalist.
