= Yohan José Romero =

Venezuelan criminal

- Born: 31 October 1977 (age 49); Aragua, Venezuela
- Other name: Johan Petrica
- Years active: 2009-present
- Organization: Tren de Aragua

Yohan José Romero known by the alias Johan Petrica, is a Venezuelan criminal and high-ranking member of Tren de Aragua. He is primarily responsible for directing the small mining town of Las Claritas located in the Orinoco Mine Arc, a place known for its illegal gold mining. Along with Héctor Guerrero Flores (Niño Guerrero) and Larry Álvarez Núñez, he is regarded as one of the founding members of the organization.

In June 2026, Niño Guerrero, the primary founder and leader of Tren de Aragua, was killed in a targeted airstrike by Venezuelan state forces. Guerrero was one of the most wanted criminals in Venezuela and the United States was offering a $5 million reward for his capture until his death. The operation was carried out with the help of the United States Department of Defense.

José Romero has been speculated to become the new head of Tren de Aragua following Guerrero's killing, along with Larry Álvarez, who was arrested in Colombia in 2024 and is currently serving a sentence there. As such, José Romero is expected to be heir to the organization given his status. However, it is unclear if he will take the role given how much the group has fragmented and been weakened in recent years. Tren de Aragua currently does not have an official leader.

== Activities ==
Between around 2009 and 2015, José Romero was incarcerated in Tocorón prison, the former headquarters of Tren de Aragua. In 2015, he escaped Tocorón and fled to Las Claritas, a town located in Sifontes, Bolívar State, known for its mining reserves. It is located in the Guayana Region of Venezuela, the municipality covers most of the Guyana-Venezuela border.

He has been accused of trafficking "military-grade" weapons for Tren de Aragua, as well as having charges of human trafficking and money laundering. The US is offering a $20 million reward for his capture.

== See also ==
- Crime in Venezuela
- Guyana–Venezuela territorial dispute
