= Tren del Llano =

Venezuelan Criminal Organization

- Founder: El Picure
- Founding location: Guárico, Venezuela
- Years active: 2008-present
- Territory: Aragua; Bolívar (state); Guárico; Sucre (state)
- Membership: 700
- Leader: Óscar de Jesús Noguera Hernández
- Activities: Drug trafficking; Extortion; Homicide; Kidnapping
- Allies: Tren de Aragua
- Rivals: Colectivos

The Tren del Llano (initially known as El Picure) is a Venezuelan criminal organization founded by José Antonio Tovar Colina alias "El Picure" in 2008, initially operating in the states of Guárico and Aragua, starting as a gang dedicated to car theft. The Tren del Llano is known for being one of the first megagangs. The gang opposes the continued rule of Nicolás Maduro after the 2024 election and subsequent controversy.

In March 2023, the Venezuelan government deployed 1,500 soldiers to Altagracia de Orituco as part of a new operation aimed at ending the gang. However, human rights defenders documented abuses by security forces, such as arbitrary arrests, among other human rights violations, during the operation.

In 2024, graffiti attributed to Tren del Llano threatened the opposition leader María Corina Machado with death.

== See also ==
- Law against Fascism, Neofascism and Similar Expressions
- 2024 Venezuelan presidential election
- Tren de Aragua
