= Barry Pollack =

American lawyer

- Born: Youngstown, Ohio
- Education: Indiana University (BS); Georgetown University (JD)
- Occupation: Lawyer

Barry J. Pollack is an American lawyer and adjunct professor at Georgetown University. He is a Fellow of the American College of Trial Lawyers, a Fellow of the American Board of Criminal Lawyers, and a former president of the National Association of Criminal Defense Lawyers. He is a partner at the New York City law firm Harris Trzaskoma LLP.

Pollack is known for representing former Enron executive Michael Krautz and WikiLeaks founder Julian Assange. He currently represents Venezuelan ex-president Nicolás Maduro in the United States v. Maduro et al.

Pollack has been described as a "thorough and deep-thinking lawyer" who "lives, breathes and sleeps trials" and has a "natural way in front of juries".

== Education and legal career ==
Pollack earned a Bachelor of Science degree in business from Indiana University in 1986, graduating with high honors. He received his Juris Doctor degree from Georgetown University Law Center in 1991, graduating magna cum laude and as a member of the Order of the Coif.

Following law school, Pollack served as a law clerk to Judge Thomas A. Flannery of the U.S. District Court for the District of Columbia. He later worked as an Assistant Federal Public Defender in the District of Maryland. He currently teaches federal criminal trial practice at Georgetown University as an adjunct professor.

== Notable cases ==
Pollack represented former Enron accountant Michael Krautz, who was acquitted. He successfully overturned the wrongful conviction of Martin Tankleff, who spent 6,338 days in prison after being convicted of his mother's murder on 7 September, 1988. Pollack also defended Paul Manafort, former campaign chairman for Donald Trump, in connection with federal investigations into financial crimes. In 2024, he represented WikiLeaks founder Julian Assange, who pleaded guilty to conspiracy to obtain and disclose national defense information and was subsequently released. In 2015, he served as counsel for Jeffrey Alexander Sterling.

=== United States v. Maduro et al. ===
Venezuelan president Nicolás Maduro was taken into U.S. custody during the 2026 United States intervention in Venezuela and appeared in federal court in Manhattan on 5 January 2026. Pollack accompanied Maduro as his private counsel. Maduro has been charged with narcoterrorism, along with his wife Cilia Flores and others. Maduro and Flores plead not guilty to the charges.

Pollack argued that Maduro was the head of a sovereign state and therefore entitled to the privilege associated with that status, and raised questions regarding the legality of Maduro's capture by U.S. forces. He stated that he anticipates extensive and complex litigation in the case.
