= Martin Tankleff =

American lawyer (born 1971)

- Born: August 29, 1971 (age 55)
- Education: Hofstra University, Touro Law Center
- Occupations: Legal, Barket Epstein Kearon Aldea & LoTurco, LLP; Georgetown University and Georgetown School of Law
- Website: martytankleff.org

Martin H. Tankleff (born August 29, 1971) is an American man who was wrongly convicted of murdering his parents, Seymour and Arlene Tankleff, on September 7, 1988, when he was 17 years old. After serving almost 18 years of imprisonment, his conviction was vacated and he was released from prison in 2007. He is now an attorney.

== Trial, conviction and sentencing ==
Tankleff was convicted of killing his parents, Seymour and Arlene Tankleff, on June 28, 1990, and sentenced to two consecutive terms of 25 years to life in prison. In December 1993, a divided New York Supreme Court, Appellate Division affirmed Tankleff's conviction.

Tankleff was admitted to the New York State Department of Correctional Services in October 1990. In state custody, Tankleff was incarcerated at the Clinton Correctional Facility in Dannemora, New York, in a special housing unit called "APPU" for high-profile inmates and inmates at high risk of victimization.

In January 1997, federal district Judge Thomas Collier Platt Jr. denied Tankleff's petition for a writ of habeas corpus. In January 1998, that judgment was affirmed by the United States Court of Appeals for the Second Circuit, with Judge Guido Calabresi writing for the unanimous panel.

In an appeal 12 years later, his lawyers presented new evidence and witnesses.

== Appeals and exoneration ==
His lawyers mounted appeals of his conviction. A 2003 appeal hearing presented new evidence from 20 witnesses who named his father's business partner as having planned, executed, and bragged about the murder. In December 2007, the New York Supreme Court, Appellate Division unanimously vacated Tankleff's conviction and sentence.

An appellate court ultimately overturned his conviction in 2008, after Tankleff had served 17 years in prison. Tankleff was represented by attorney Barry Pollack.

Before the Suffolk County District Attorney dropped the charges, New York Governor Eliot Spitzer appointed New York Attorney General Andrew Cuomo as special prosecutor in the case. From his staff, Cuomo selected Chief Trial Counsel Benjamin Rosenberg and veteran homicide prosecutor Thomas Schellhammer to re-investigate the case.

With the investigation completed, on June 16, 2008, Rosenberg said to Justice Doyle, "The issue in this case is not whether there is evidence, but whether there is sufficient evidence." Rosenberg announced: "The people move to dismiss the indictment." In the same motion, prosecutors announced they would not proceed against suspects identified by Tankleff's defense team, though it admitted some evidence pointed to other suspects, asserting that, "on balance, the defense theory does not appear to be supported by clear evidence; there are sufficient conflicting pieces that could raise the issue of reasonable doubt."

On July 22, 2008, Justice Doyle concurred with the Attorney General's motion to dismiss. All charges facing Tankleff were dropped; he would not face retrial.

== Suit and settlement ==
Tankleff filed a civil suit against the state for his wrongful conviction and emotional distress. On January 7, 2014, Tankleff was awarded $13.4 million from the state as settlement of the lawsuit. By that time, Tankleff was in his last semester of law school. He graduated from the Touro Law Center on May 25, 2014. In April 2017, he passed the New York State bar exam.

Tankleff had dismissed one of his New York attorneys over personal differences. This attorney persistently sent demands for money to Tankleff and was eventually convicted of harassment.

== Federal case ==
Tankleff and new attorneys appeared before the U.S. District Court, the Eastern District of New York in Central Islip, New York for a hearing on October 30, 2017. He sued Suffolk County, in addition to various people who were police and county employees at the time of his arrest and trial. Tankleff was represented by Barry Scheck of the Innocence Project in Manhattan. In April 2018, Tankleff reached a settlement with Suffolk County for $10 million.

== See also ==
- List of unsolved deaths
