= Ronna Rísquez =

Venezuelan journalist

Ronna Rísquez is a Venezuelan investigative journalist. Rísquez has worked for El Nacional and Runrunes media, in addition to being a finalist for the Gabo Journalism Award in 2016 and participating in the Panama Papers investigation team. In 2023, she published a book on the Tren de Aragua criminal gang.

== Career ==
Rísquez graduated in social communication from the Central University of Venezuela. During her career as a journalist, she has covered issues of violence, citizen security, organized crime and human rights. She worked at El Nacional as editor of the politics and crime sections, and was director of research for the Runrunes portal, where she founded Monitor de Víctimas, a data journalism platform finalist of the Data Journalism Awards in 2018. She has also been regional coordinator of the Monitor and coordinator of Alianza Rebelde Investiga, a coalition between the Venezuelan media TalCual, El Pitazo and Runrunes.

In 2016, Rísquez was a finalist for the Colombian Gabo Journalism Award and participated in the team of journalists who worked on the Panama Papers investigative project. By 2023, Rísquez had more than twenty years of experience as a journalist. In 2023, Ronna published the book El Tren de Aragua. La banda que revolucionó el crimen organizado en América Latina, a work that documents the history and activity of the criminal gang of the same name. The journalist reported that at least eight of her relatives were threatened as a consequence of the publication of the book.

== Works ==
- El Tren de Aragua. La banda que revolucionó el crimen organizado en América Latina (2023)
