= Mariano Díaz (photographer) =

Chilean-born Venezuelan photographer

- Mariano Díaz Bravo
- Born: Mariano Díaz Bravo; August 19, 1929 (age 96); Rancagua, Chile
- Known for: Photography, graphic design, writing, folk art promotion
- Notable work: Bolívar hecho a mano, María Lionza: religiosidad mágica de Venezuela, El barro figureado
- Style: Documentary photography, cultural journalism
- Movement: Venezuelan folk art documentation
- Awards: Premio Nacional de Arte Popular "Aquiles Nazoa"; 1993 CONAC First Prize for Photography; 1984

Mariano Díaz Bravo (born 19 August 1929 in Rancagua, Chile) is a Chilean-born Venezuelan photographer, graphic designer and writer, best known for his contributions to the study and promotion of Venezuelan folk art. In 1993, he received the Premio Nacional de Arte Popular "Aquiles Nazoa" (Popular Culture National Prize), Venezuela's highest honor for folk artists and folk art promoters.

== Biography ==
Mariano Díaz was born on 19 August 1929, in the city of Rancagua, 87 km south of Chile's capital, Santiago. From 1954 to 1960, Díaz worked as a graphic designer for the University of Chile's Experimental Theater Department. Then, in 1960 he moved to Caracas, Venezuela, invited by the Universidad Central de Venezuela. In Venezuela he worked as a photojournalist, graphic designer and writer for several Venezuelan newspapers and magazines, including La Esfera, El Mundo, La República, and El Nacional. He was Director of Publications for the Universidad de Oriente, Director of Art and Publications Advisor for the President's Central Information Office and Publications Coordinator for CVF. Since 1978, Díaz has exclusively worked as a free-lance writer and graphic designer.

In the late 1970s, Díaz also begins photographing, documenting and collecting Venezuelan folk art, interviewing folk artists and promoting their works. Since the 1980s, he has published several books that portray some of the most representative Venezuelan folk artists, including Feliciano Carvallo and Sixto Sarmiento.

He has won several prizes for his photographic works, including the Venezuelan National Council for Culture CONAC first prize for photography (1984)

As a tribute to his publications and continuing support of Venezuelan folk art, Díaz was awarded the Premio Nacional de Arte Popular "Aquiles Nazoa" (Popular Culture National Prize) in 1993.

In March, 2008, the Venezuelan National Museums Foundation bought 150 pieces of Díaz's folk art private collection, which are now part of a permanent exhibit at the Venezuelan National Folk Art Museum in Petare, Venezuela.

== Published works ==
- Díaz, Mariano (1983), Bolívar hecho a mano, Caracas, Venezuela: Ediciones Marcaribe, OCLC 11756197
- Díaz, Mariano (1984), Por un cielo de barros y maderas, Caracas, Venezuela: Ediciones Cerámicas Carabobo de Valencia, OCLC 11756197
- Díaz, Mariano (1985), El alma entre los dedos, Caracas, Venezuela, ISBN 980-265-523-6
- Díaz, Mariano; Sarmiento, Sixto (1987), Sixto Sarmiento, tejedor del arte de cobija y músico muy a su mandar, Caracas, Venezuela: Grupo Univensa, ISBN 980-265-523-6, OCLC 17618409
- Díaz, Mariano (1987), María Lionza, religiosidad mágica de Venezuela, Barquisimeto, Venezuela: Grupo Univensa, OCLC 11756197
- Díaz, Mariano (1988), Fabuladores del color, Caracas, Venezuela: Fundación Bigott, ISBN 980-300-362-3, OCLC 21336117
- Díaz, Mariano (1989), Milagreros del camino, Caracas, Venezuela: Fundación Bigott, ISBN 980-300-840-4, OCLC 24846018
- Díaz, Mariano (1990), El barro figureado, Caracas, Venezuela: Fundación Bigott, OCLC 24846018
- Díaz, Mariano (1993), 65 Hombres para Bolívar / El Libertador de las Mujeres, Caracas, Venezuela: Corporación Cerámicas Carabobo, ISBN 980-07-1228-3, OCLC 31709358
