= Tren de Aragua =

Venezuelan criminal organization

- Founded: 2014
- Founding location: Aragua, Venezuela
- Years active: 2014−present
- Territory: Venezuela; Bolivia; Brazil; Chile; Colombia; Costa Rica; Ecuador; Mexico; Panama; Peru; United States
- Ethnicity: Venezuelan
- Membership: 7,000+
- Leader: Niño Guerrero (until 2026)
- Activities: Murder, protection racketeering, drug-trafficking, human-trafficking, forced prostitution, sex trafficking, rape, human smuggling, kidnappings-for-ransom, retail theft, robbery, illegal mining, bribery, money laundering, terrorism, and narcoterrorism
- Allies: Venezuela (alleged by the United States government; disputed by the United States Intelligence Community) (Note: via the Cartel of the Suns; alleged by the US government but considered "highly unlikely" by the US National Intelligence) (Note: Chile pointed out Venezuelan authorities were implicated in Ronald Ojeda's assassination); Primeiro Comando da Capital; Comando Vermelho; La Empresa; La Linea; La Unión Tepito; Jalisco New Generation Cartel; Los Tiguerones (from November 2023); Los Lobos; Tren del Llano
- Rivals: La Oficina; Bolivarian Forces of Liberation; Colectivos; Militarized Communist Party of Peru; Clan del Golfo; FARC dissidents ELN; Los Tiguerones (until November 2023); Latin Kings; La Unión Tepito (certain cells); Fuerza Anti-Unión; Sinaloa Cartel

Tren de Aragua (Spanish pronunciation: [tɾen de aˈɾaɣwa]; English: Aragua Train) is a transnational organized crime syndicate from Venezuela. Tren de Aragua was led by Héctor Rusthenford Guerrero Flores, alias "Niño Guerrero", until his death in June 2026. He was incarcerated at Tocorón prison (also known as Aragua Penitentiary Center) from 2013 to 2023, which functioned at the time as the organization's de facto headquarters. Though Tocorón prison was taken over by Venezuelan security forces during a raid in 2023, the leadership escaped.

Tren de Aragua was founded by Héctor Guerrero Flores, Yohan José Romero and Larry Álvarez Núñez in 2014. The gang expanded throughout Latin America and the United States during the Venezuelan refugee crisis, taking advantage of the refugee wave by acting as civilians. On 20 January 2025, US president Donald Trump signed an executive order initiating the process of designating various drug cartels and transnational gangs, including Tren de Aragua, as Foreign Terrorist Organizations. The designation took effect on 20 February 2025. In March 2025, the Trump administration ordered the deportation of alleged Tren de Aragua members, citing the Alien Enemies Act of 1798. The order was temporarily halted pending further legal challenges. Experts have disputed the designation as a terrorist organization, describing it as motivated by money and not political ideology.

In the United States, President Trump has referenced Tren de Aragua in discussions of immigration policy, comparing it to organizations such as Al-Qaeda and Islamic State, citing its reported presence when invoking the Alien Enemies Act of 1798, a wartime law historically applied in contexts of armed conflict. This legislation affected deportation procedures for Venezuelan nationals, with the administration arguing they posed a terrorist threat. U.S. intelligence reports have indicated that the group operates independently of Venezuelan state control and lacks a coordinated structure within the country. Some analysts have compared current patterns to the 1980 Mariel boatlift, when the Cuban regime allowed mass departure of citizens, including a significant number of common prisoners and others deemed undesirable.

Reports indicate that members of Tren de Aragua have embedded themselves within Venezuelan refugee groups in Colombia, Peru, and Chile, which has established a greater presence of the group throughout South America. Combating the gang has become a priority for many nations where Tren de Aragua operates. The 2023 raid operation on the Aragua Penitentiary Center, considered the group's headquarters at the time, occurred following reports of crimes committed by the group in neighboring nations.

== Origin ==
Tren de Aragua began in the Tocorón prison in Aragua. The name of the group may trace its origins to a labor union that was working on a railway project in Aragua.

== Identification criteria in the United States ==
Members of Tren de Aragua are primarily Venezuelans. The evidence gathered in the context of the migratory measures implemented by the Trump administration is based on a form designed to determine the alleged membership in the organization known as the Tren de Aragua. The document submitted as evidence establishes that the individual questioned must be Venezuelan, be 14 years of age or older, and not possess U.S. citizenship or residency, and based on these requirements a table is used which contains 20 criteria distributed in six subgroups (Judicial Sentences and Official Documents, Self-admission, Criminal Conduct and Information, Documents and Communications, Symbolism, and Association), in which between two and ten points are assigned according to the fulfillment of each condition, with the accumulation of eight points implying designation as a member of the Tren de Aragua.

Among the criteria, the assignment of 10 points is notable in cases of conviction for violations of U.S. law related to activities connected with the organization or for the explicit admission of membership. The existence of information from U.S. intelligence sources or foreign partners, testimonies from victims, community members, or informants, may contribute 3–4 of these points. 3–6 points may be awarded upon the verification of communications or financial transfers to known members of the organization. Indications of membership or loyalty through tattoos, clothing, group photographs, or other symbols may contribute 4 points. Social media posts containing symbols or associated references may contribute 2 points.

The evidence presented by the ACLU includes guides developed by the Department of Homeland Security and the Border Patrol for the identification of alleged members of the Tren de Aragua, in which elements such as tattoos representing trains, crowns, stars, an AK-47 type weapon, watches, the Jordan symbol, or the phrase "Real until death" are highlighted, although discrepancies exist between both guides in the interpretation of certain criteria, for example with regard to the use of sportswear associated with teams such as the Chicago Bulls, indicating a difference in the evaluation of the element as indicative of membership.

=== Identification of members ===
The United States Department of Justice uses a point system to identify potential Tren de Aragua members:

- Judicial Outcomes and Official Documents (15 points): Convictions as documents confirming membership in Tren de Aragua.
- Self-Admission (10 points): If the person verbally or in writing self-identifies as a member or associate of Tren de Aragua.
- Criminal Conduct and Information (17 points): Participation in criminal activities with Tren de Aragua members, financial transactions indicating criminal activity, such as money laundering
- Documents and Communications (25 points): Written or electronic communications with known Tren de Aragua members
- Symbolism (14 points): Tattoos, social media posts, graffiti marking Tren de Aragua territory, hand signs, or clothing with insignia related to Tren de Aragua observed by law enforcement, either in person or through virtual means.
- Association (6 points): close associations with Tren de Aragua members

Those that score less than eight points may still be deported at the discretion of the Immigration and Customs Enforcement.

=== Tattoos ===
Although some members have tattoos, the organization does not have specific tattoos that signify membership in the manner of the maras, such as MS13 or 18th Street. Rather, Tren de Aragua is reminiscent of former criminal organizations in South America including the Medellin Cartel or Cali Cartel, which similarly did not use signifying tattoos, thus preventing easy identification.

== Operations ==
Tren de Aragua engages in a variety of criminal activities including arms trafficking, bribery, drug-trafficking, illegal mining, kidnappings-for-ransom, and money laundering. It holds a particularly dominant role in human-trafficking and human smuggling in Latin America. The gang has alliances with Primeiro Comando da Capital in Brazil.

=== Argentina ===
On 29 May 2025, Argentine Security Minister Patricia Bullrich announced the arrest of 12 alleged members of Tren de Aragua, whom Bullrich accused of several offenses. Argentina had recently classified Tren de Aragua as a terrorist organization.

=== Chile ===
Tren de Aragua's branch in Chile is known as "the Pirates of Aragua". Amidst the Tarapacá migrant crisis in northern Chile, Tren de Aragua engaged in trafficking of women across from the Bolivian border to Santiago. By October 2021 there were reports that Chilean authorities were conducting four different investigations related to the criminal organization. On 24 March 2022 Investigations Police of Chile (PDI) declared to have dismantled the Chilean branch of Tren de Aragua. One of the Tren de Aragua members captured in March 2022 had Interpol arrest warrants for murders in Venezuela and Peru. Six other migrant traffickers of Tren de Aragua were also captured in March 2022 by Chilean police. A Venezuelan political dissident Ronald Ojeda was kidnapped on 21 February 2024 and his body was discovered 10 days later inside a bag which had been cemented over. On April 10, 2024, Venezuelan Foreign Minister Yván Gil denied the existence of the Tren de Aragua during an interview with Colombian Foreign Minister Luis Gilberto Murillo in the city of Cúcuta. In response to this denial, Chilean President Gabriel Boric recalled Chile's ambassador to Venezuela, Jaime Gazmuri, for consultations. On 11 April 2024, Chilean authorities implicated Tren de Aragua in the murder of Ronald Ojeda, a Venezuelan political dissident and opponent to Nicolás Maduro who had been living in exile in Chile. Chilean authorities accused Venezuela's interior minister, Diosdado Cabello, of ordering Tren de Aragua to carry out the killing and paying the assassins.

The leader of Chile's Tren de Aragua branch, Rafael Gámez, was arrested in the US state of Texas in December 2024 on charges of human trafficking. Chile initiated proceedings to extradite Gámez. In January 2025 in reaction to the Chilean prosecutor's findings on Ronald Ojeda murder, Chilean Interior Minister Carolina Tohá said that Chile would appeal to the International Criminal Court if Venezuelan government involvement in the case was confirmed.

In June 2026, the largest money-laundering network linked to Tren de Aragua in Chile was dismantled. José Carlos Pérez Asencio, a Venezuelan citizen and executive at Banco Santander, had been laundering money since 2022 from Tren de Aragua's illegal activities such as extortion, smuggling, drug trafficking, and human trafficking, using bank accounts at Banco Falabella, Scotiabank, among others. 14 of the 19 detainees were members of "Los Shelby", a faction of Tren de Aragua, and one female member was also an executive at BancoEstado. The Financial Analysis Unit (UAF) alerted the National Prosecutor on at least four occasions between April 2024 and May 2026 about suspicious transactions involving individuals and companies linked to Tren de Aragua, including the Banco Santander executive.

On 14 July 2026, the Chamber of Deputies adopted a resolution requesting President José Antonio Kast to recognize Tren de Aragua as a terrorist organization. The resolution was widely approved, except by the Broad Front and the Communist Party.

=== Peru ===
Due to Tren de Aragua's heavy presence in Lima, there were increased sentiments of xenophobia against Venezuelans. Following clashes between Peruvians and Venezuelan migrants at the Gamarra Market in Lima, the "Los Gallegos" chapter of the Tren de Aragua released a video stating "There will be no peace for Peruvians who support xenophobia. We will begin to kill all Peruvian motortaxi drivers." In 2023 alone, at least 183 suspected members were arrested.

=== United States ===
Tren de Aragua began emerging throughout the United States during the early 2020s, which saw a surge of migrants crossing the Mexico-U.S. border, particularly from Venezuela. Telemundo, citing multiple criminal cases against suspected members of the gang, wrote in March 2024 that the group evidently "also has an increasingly widespread presence in the United States". In January 2024, the Federal Bureau of Investigation confirmed reports that the gang was operating in the United States. On 11 July 2024, the US Treasury Department and the White House announced sanctions against the gang and designated it a "transnational criminal organization". The State Department is also offering a $12 million reward for information leading to the arrest of the organization's leaders. In 2024, U.S. officials at the U.S.-Mexico border implemented enhanced interviews of single Venezuelan male migrants in order to screen for Tren de Aragua members. Tren de Aragua members have been linked to crimes throughout the United States, including murders.

Tren de Aragua first appeared in Chicago and its suburbs in October 2023. Chief Garry McCarthy of Willow Springs estimated that hundreds of gang members were present in the city. The Chicago Sun-Times reported in November 2023 that "A Sun-Times analysis found shoplifting and domestic violence arrests, but little proof of the gang's presence among migrants." In New York City, the gang has been linked since 2022 to shootings, thefts in retail stores, street robberies, forced prostitution, extortion, and drug dealing. Police say that members live or have lived in the city's migrant shelters, and are believed to recruit there.

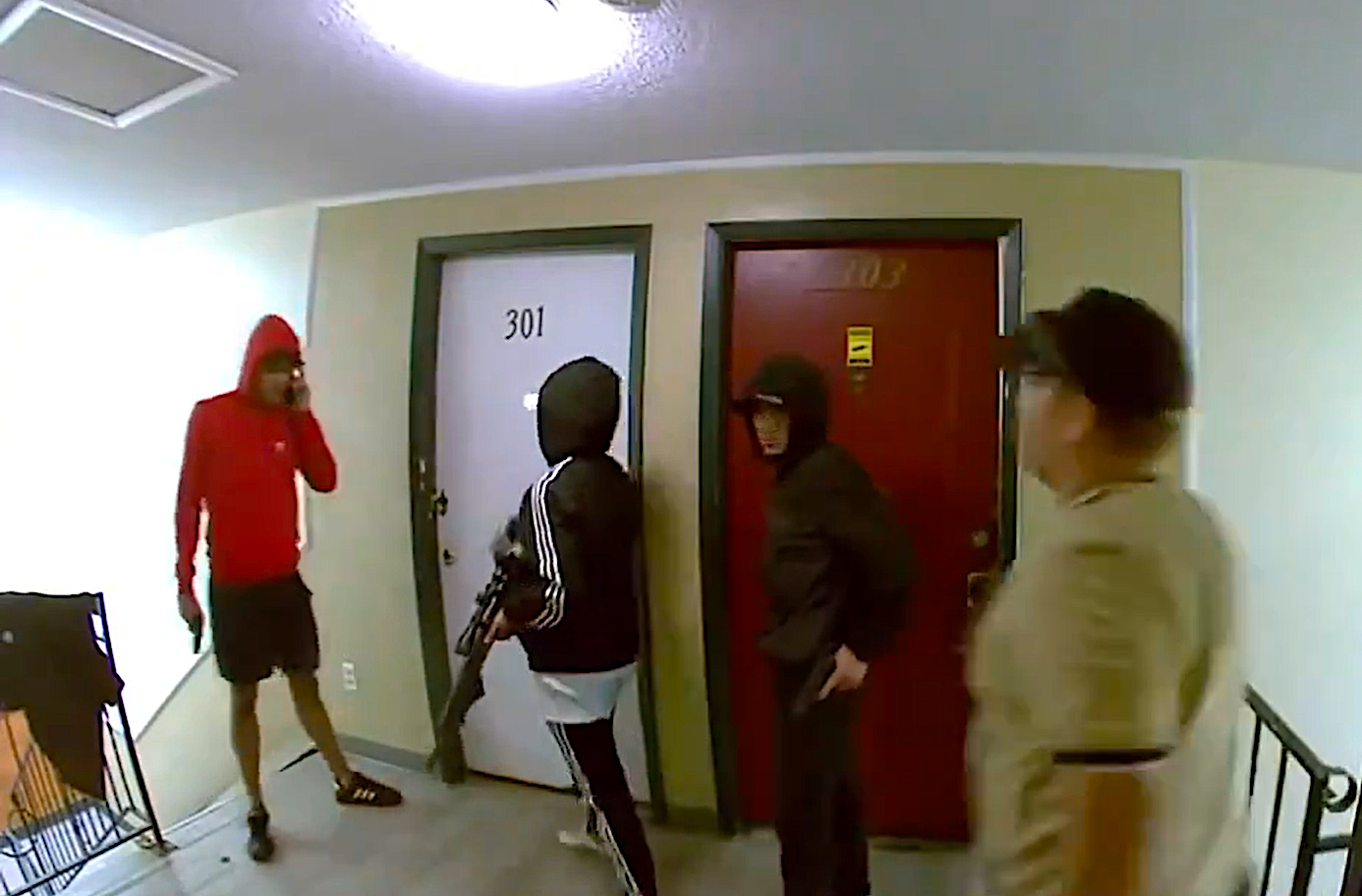
Alleged members of Tren de Aragua in Aurora, Colorado (2024)

Texas governor Greg Abbott announced a series of measures aimed at combating the Tren de Aragua. Among the orders issued on 16 September 2024, are the launch of a statewide operation focused on addressing the criminal group and the declaration of Tren de Aragua as a foreign terrorist organization.

FBI agents in El Paso, Texas reported that 41 suspected members of the Tren de Aragua were arrested in 2023. In 2024, a state investigator told KUTV that a number of crimes in the Salt Lake City metropolitan area were linked to Tren de Aragua, including a September 2024 shooting in Herriman. Most of the reported crimes included theft, illegal drug distribution, and sextortion. The gang was prominently featured in Donald Trump's 2024 presidential campaign. An opinion piece in Americas Quarterly said that Tren de Aragua's reach in the United States was exaggerated, with the gang only having permanent cells outside of Venezuela in Peru and Chile, and even having limited success in setting up operations in Venezuela's neighboring country of Colombia. On 20 January 2025, President Trump signed an executive order initiating the process to designate various drug cartels and transnational gangs, including Tren de Aragua, as Foreign Terrorist Organizations, To combat the purported gang activity, hundreds of ICE agents participated in raids during the months of January and February 2025. One alleged gang member was arrested. On 28 January 2025 ICE arrested 25 members. On 29 January 2025, eight alleged Tren de Aragua gang members were arrested at an apartment complex in Queens, New York because they were indicted on charges of arms trafficking, where police seized 34 firearms, two others were wanted outstanding.

In March 2025, 200 detainees alleged by the Trump administration to be members of the Tren de Aragua gang were deported from the US to El Salvador despite a court order blocking the deportation. The United States Court of Appeals reviewed the government's appeal against the temporary injunction issued by federal judge James Boasberg on the enforcement of the Alien Enemies Act, invoked by President Donald Trump on the 15th of that month with the aim of accelerating the deportation of Venezuelan migrants, allegedly members of the criminal group Tren de Aragua, to El Salvador. Judge Karen Henderson, one of the three magistrates handling the case, stated that the treatment of these migrants was worse than that given to expelled Nazis during World War II, citing the lack of legal safeguards and the speed with which they were put on planes to the Central American country. The stance was challenged by Deputy Attorney General Drew Ensign, who defended the administration's actions as a necessary national security measure, although Henderson countered that the use of the statute in this context was unprecedented. During the hearing, attorney Lee Gelernt, representing the plaintiffs, accused the government of using a shortcut to carry out summary deportations, arguing that the majority of the deported Venezuelans were not part of the Tren de Aragua, an organization that, according to him, lacks a hierarchical structure and has not carried out an invasion of the country. On 8 January 2026, two individuals were shot by ICE agents in Portland, Oregon. Department of Homeland Security alleges that the duo "weaponized their vehicle against Border Patrol." It was claimed by the DHS the following day that two individuals who were shot in the car were tied to the Venezuelan organization Tren de Aragua.

==== Aurora, Colorado ====
In Aurora, Colorado, surveillance footage of gunmen entering apartments went viral in 2024, leading the city's mayor, Mike Coffman, to state that the gang had "infiltrated" various apartment buildings in the area. These claims were challenged by the Aurora Police Department, which stated that, "[b]ased on [our] initial investigative work, we believe reports of [Tren de Aragua] influence in Aurora are isolated."

NBC News described the reports as "rumors" with the "fact checking" News Literacy Project describing the reports as "misinformation". The social media network Meta labeled the reports "false" on their platforms.

Four men out of the six seen in the video were arrested, and five buildings at the apartment complex were ordered to be shut down, as they were described as a "criminal nuisance." Contentions that Aurora was overrun by the gang were highlighted by a number of news outlets. President Donald Trump, as part of his presidential campaign's focus on illegal immigration, maintained that parts of the city were controlled by the gang.

On 25 January 2025, federal and local authorities raided an illegal night club in Adams County, Colorado. The raid arrested 41 illegal aliens, and seized drugs, weapons and cash. The DEA had been investigating TdA activities in the area in the months prior to the raid.

On 26 April 2025, a raid at an illegal night club outside Colorado Springs resulted in the arrest of over 100 people including illegal aliens. The club was reported to host prostitution and drug trafficking and the presence of members of Tren de Aragua and MS-13. The raid at an illegal night club for violent street gangs also nabbed over a dozen active duty US military members.

==== Alien and Sedition Acts of 1798 ====
In March 2025, president Donald Trump ordered the detention and deportation of more than 200 Venezuelan citizens, accusing them of being members of the Venezuelan criminal group Tren de Aragua, despite not providing evidence of such affiliation. To carry out these deportations, the Trump administration invoked the Alien and Sedition Act of 1798, a statute that grants the president the authority to detain and expel citizens from countries with which the United States is at war. The legislation, enacted during John Adams' presidency in the context of tensions with France, had been applied on three previous occasions, during the War of 1812 against the United Kingdom; in World War I, when more than 6,000 German citizens were interned in concentration camps; and in World War II, when more than 30,000 persons of Japanese, German, and Italian descent were detained on U.S. soil. Trump justified the law's application by alleging that Tren de Aragua was planning a "predatory invasion or raid" in the United States, although a federal judge, James Boasberg, ruled that the statute could not be used in this context, as it requires the threat to originate from a foreign government or state. Despite this judicial ruling, the White House continued with the deportations. The administration also fired two intelligence officials for their assessment that the gang and the Venezuelan government were not associated with each other, therefore undermining their attempt to use the act as justification for the deportations.

Legal experts and civil rights organizations criticized the measure, noting that the application of the Foreign Enemies Act allows the government to carry out expulsions without providing procedural guarantees, such as the right to a defense or to appeal in immigration courts. Moreover, the regulation does not require concrete evidence to qualify a person as a threat, which has led to allegations of abuse of power. The Venezuelan government, through Interior Minister Diosdado Cabello, asserted that none of the deported individuals had any links to Tren de Aragua and that only 17 of the first 190 deportees had criminal records. Trump's executive order is part of his promise to carry out the largest wave of deportations in the country's history, which has resulted in an increase in raids and the detention of immigrants. According to data from U.S. Immigration and Customs Enforcement (ICE), at least 32,000 people have been arrested since January 2025, of whom approximately 9,000 were migrants with legal status, without criminal records, or awaiting immigration rulings—figures that ICE described as "collateral damage." The decision has been strongly criticized by human rights organizations, such as the Center for American Progress, which denounced the use of a law last invoked during World War II to justify the detention of thousands of people without trial, describing it as a "dangerous abuse of power."

==== Criminalization of asylum ====
Human rights organizations have raised concerns about the misuse of visual or cultural stereotypes as justification for deportations, often carried out before scheduled court hearings or pending legal decisions. This practice has been criticized for undermining the principles of international law and fundamental rights to legal defense and asylum. One of the most notable purported cases is that of Jerce Reyes Barrios, a 36-year-old Venezuelan football player who was deported to El Salvador by the Trump administration due to his alleged association with the group Tren de Aragua. Reyes Barrios had legally entered the United States in 2024 and applied for asylum after allegedly fleeing torture in Venezuela. He was scheduled to appear in court in April but was removed from the country without prior notice. Although a federal judge ordered a halt to deportation flights, the government claimed that the flights were already beyond its jurisdiction at the time. Over 200 Venezuelans have been transferred to the Terrorism Confinement Center (CECOT) in El Salvador under the 1798 Alien Enemies Act. The deportations have been denounced by Nicolás Maduro's government, which called the transfers a "kidnapping" and denied any links between the deportees and the gang.

==== Statements by the Secretary of Homeland Security ====
Homeland Security Secretary Kristi Noem said that the migrants sent to CECOT should remain there "for the rest of their lives," highlighting collaboration with Salvadoran President Nayib Bukele to expand the prison's capacity, which housed 14,000 inmates (as of June 2024) and has room for 40,000. Noem also visited CECOT and warned that illegal immigrants who commit crimes in the United States could end up in that prison. However, human rights organizations such as Cristosal denounced that many of the deportees have no criminal records and were identified as gang members solely based on tattoos. Additionally, it was reported that the migrants are being held incommunicado, with no access to their families or lawyers, and that neither the U.S. nor Salvadoran governments have provided complete lists of the detainees or information about their current status. Cristosal also warned that these actions could constitute enforced disappearances and violations of international human rights law.

==== Family separation incident ====
In April 2025, Venezuelan toddler Maikelys Antonella Espinoza Bernal, two years old, remained in foster care in the United States after her mother, Yorely Bernal, was deported to Venezuela without her. The child's father, Maiker Espinoza, had previously been sent in March to CECOT, as part of a series of deportations carried out by U.S. authorities based on alleged ties to the Venezuelan criminal organization Tren de Aragua, although no conclusive evidence has been presented. The administration of former President Donald Trump, within the context of intensified immigration measures, claimed that Bernal and Espinoza were active members of the gang, accusing them of leading criminal operations; however, official records in Venezuela, Peru, and the United States do not show any criminal history for the couple beyond immigration offenses. Antonella, born in Lima, Peru, on 8 February 2023, entered U.S. territory in May 2024 with her parents after traveling through several countries and the Darién jungle. The child was separated from her parents at the border based on suspicions related to their tattoos, which authorities considered indicative of gang affiliation, despite the designs featuring animated characters and personal symbols. Since her arrival in the United States, the girl has been moved between multiple foster homes under the supervision of the Office of Refugee Resettlement. Her family, from Maracaibo, Venezuela, has requested her reunification, stating that Antonella has experienced emotional instability due to the constant changes in residence and caregivers. Although Bernal was informed by U.S. officials that her daughter would be deported with her, when she boarded the flight to Caracas on 25 April 2025, the child was not present. The U.S. administration has not clarified whether the girl will eventually be returned to her family.

==== Use of ordinary tattoos as evidence ====
The United States government classified migrants sent to Guantánamo as members of the Tren de Aragua, primarily based on tattoos allegedly associated with the gang, such as crowns, flowers, the phrase "real hasta la muerte", a crown over a soccer ball, an eyeball that "looked cool", and a silhouette of Michael Jordan. Defense attorneys argue that the arrests were made without concrete evidence, and former Venezuelan officials deny that the gang used any specific symbolism in tattoos. Despite the absence of evidence of an organized gang operation in the United States, more than 200 Venezuelans were transferred to the Centro de Confinamiento del Terrorismo (CECOT) in El Salvador under the Alien Enemies Act of 1798. Described by experts as unconstitutional, the deportations were denounced by the Nicolás Maduro regime, which characterized the transfers as a "kidnapping" and denied any links between the deportees and the gang. Linette Tobin, attorney for detainee Jerce Reyes Barrios, stated that there is no evidence linking him to the criminal organization, that the only basis the DHS had for such a connection was a tattoo similar to Real Madrid symbols and a photograph in which he made a sign language gesture, and that his whereabouts have been unknown since his deportation on 15 March.

==== Strikes on alleged cartel boats ====
US military forces attacking a boat, killing eleven people. The boat was alleged to be operated by Tren de Aragua, 2 September 2025

On 2 September 2025, US President Donald Trump announced that the US Navy sank an alleged drug vessel, suspected of being operated by members of Tren de Aragua in the Southern Caribbean amid tension between the two countries, killing eleven people. On 15 September 2025, President Trump announced on Truth Social that the military carried out an attack on a boat in the Caribbean, leaving three dead. The president claimed the victims were "narco-terrorists from Venezuela". This was the second such operation in two weeks. Trump warned that they will "hunt down" those who attempt to transport drugs.

On 22 December 2025, the Trump administration confirmed that they were chasing after an oil tanker that was attempting to claim Russian protection. The pursuit of the tanker came days after the US government targeted a facility inside of Venezuela where boats that the Trump administration alleges were being loaded with drugs by Tren de Aragua before being set on a course for the United States.

=== Venezuela ===
State of Aragua (highlighted in red) in Venezuela

In September 2023, 11,000 members of the Venezuelan security forces reclaimed the Aragua Penitentiary Center, which served as the gang's headquarters. On 22 January 2025, during the inauguration of the military and police exercises "Bolivarian Shield 2025", Venezuelan President Nicolás Maduro described the Tren de Aragua as a "construct" aimed at destabilizing the country and facilitating interventionist scenarios. Maduro stated that although gangs like the Tren de Aragua and the Tren del Llano existed in the past, they were dismantled and defeated in Venezuela.

The Trump administration has claimed that Venezuela's president Nicolás Maduro is in control of Tren de Aragua. Venezuela's close relationship with Iran in addition to Hezbollah's alleged collaboration with the organized crime syndicate has also been cited as evidence by the Trump administration of collaboration with the Venezuelan government. On 7 April 2025, a declassified intelligence report published by the Office of the Director of National Intelligence concluded that, while some Venezuelan officials may have tolerated or collaborated with Tren de Aragua, there was no evidence of widespread, organized cooperation. Any collaboration between the criminal organization and the Venezuelan government is described as "highly unlikely" by National Intelligence.

==== Position of the Venezuelan government ====
Venezolana de Televisión announcing the action in Estado Bolívar leading to the death of the alleged leader of the organization, Niño Guerrero.

During the 512th edition of his television program Con el Mazo Dando, broadcast on 19 March 2025, Venezuela's Minister of Interior, Justice and Peace and vice president of the United Socialist Party of Venezuela (PSUV), Diosdado Cabello, accused leaders of the Venezuelan opposition and former Colombian presidents of maintaining ties with the criminal group Tren de Aragua, using it for political destabilization purposes. Cabello claimed that figures such as Álvaro Uribe, Iván Duque, Juan Manuel Santos, and Andrés Pastrana, along with Venezuelan opposition leaders like Juan Guaidó, Leopoldo López, María Corina Machado, Edmundo González, Carlos Vecchio, Julio Borges, Miguel Pizarro, and David Smolansky, were involved in the creation and protection of criminal networks aimed at destabilizing the country. The accusations also included financing through Colombian narco-paramilitarism, human and drug trafficking, assassinations, and attacks against state institutions. Cabello alleged that the alias El Wilexis, attributed to Wuileisys Acevedo, killed by Venezuelan forces during the Bolivarian Shield 2025 exercises, was the leader of the "Comanditos", alleged shock groups activated by the opposition after President Nicolás Maduro's re-election in the 28 July presidential elections. Among the group's alleged plans were an attack on the National Assembly during the presidential inauguration and assaults on international guests. The minister also blamed Colombian authorities for failing to act on information shared by the Venezuelan government regarding meetings of criminal leaders on Colombian territory.

After President Trump declared Tren de Aragua a terrorist organization in January 2025, Cabello expressed agreement but alleged that the group's true "partners" are located on US soil and operate publicly with the knowledge of authorities, particularly the FBI. Although he asserted that the criminal organization is deeply embedded in international networks protected by the opposition, on 21 March 2025, the same minister stated that none of the more than one hundred Venezuelans deported by the United States to a prison in El Salvador are members of Tren de Aragua, contradicting Washington's official justification for the mass deportation. Additionally, Venezuela's Attorney General, Tarek William Saab, confirmed the organization's dismantling within the country, with the arrest of 48 individuals, reiterating that some of its members are in Colombia and the US with the support of exiled opposition members. Saab requested the extradition of the individuals so they could be tried in Venezuela and face prison sentences of up to 30 years.

On 12 June 2026, U.S. president Donald Trump announced that the boss Héctor Rusthenford Guerrero Flores, alias "Niño Guerrero", was killed in a "swift and lethal kinetic strike" at the age of 42, conducted by the U.S. Southern Command in coordination with the Venezuelan government, describing him as a "terrorist". The following day, the Venezuelan government confirmed that Guerrero had been killed during a joint operation in Bolívar, during which intelligence was exchanged between the two countries. During the operation, clashes occurred with gang members located in the area.

== See also ==
- Tren del Llano
- Crime in Venezuela
- Legal affairs of the second Trump presidency
- Mano Dura
- March 2025 American deportations of Venezuelans
- National TPS Alliance v. Noem
- Ronna Rísquez
