= Aragua Penitentiary Center =

Prison in Aragua State, Venezuela

- Location in Venezuela
- Location: Tocorón, Zamora Municipality, Aragua, Venezuela; 10.083333°N 67.577222°W
- Status: Operational
- Security class: Maximum security
- Capacity: 750
- Population: 7,000 (2016)
- Opened: 1982
- Managed by: Ministry of People's Power for Penitentiary Service
- Director: Rigoberto Jesús Fernández Colina
- Warden: Ezequiel Antonio Pérez Rivero

The Aragua Penitentiary Center, also known as Tocorón prison, is a prison in Venezuela located in the town of Tocorón, in Aragua State.

== History ==
The prison was built in 1982 with a capacity for 750 inmates; by 2016 it housed over 7,000 prisoners.

On 15 March 2007, 300 inmates began a hunger strike in protest at mistreatment of prisoners and their visitors; on 4 May, an internal riot left two dead and 23 injured, including the prison’s deputy director, Francisco Marcano.

In 2010, a clash over control of the facility left 16 dead.

The prison, like most Venezuelan facilities, suffers from serious administrative, health and security deficiencies. In 2014, organised crime took control of the complex.

It is one of the most violent prisons in the country, where inmates, heavily armed (even with hand grenades), engage in bloody gang clashes. The criminal organization known as the Tren de Aragua emerged here.

The complex controlled by Tren de Aragua featured a swimming pool, a nightclub, a baseball stadium and a zoo, as well as tunnels allowing free entry and exit.

== 2023 prison raid ==
In September 2023, the penitentiary became the focus of national and international attention due to an operation to retake control of the prison led by the Bolivarian National Armed Forces (FANB) called Operation Liberation Cacique Guaicaipuro, and the leader of the criminal gang, Héctor Guerrero Flores, escaped before the raid. On 20 September, around 11,000 FANB agents were deployed to Tocorón to neutralise about 5,500 inmates, many armed. This deployment raised scepticism among experts and the public over its legitimacy and transparency, especially after authorities initially failed to confirm the whereabouts of thousands of inmates post-operation. A major of the Bolivarian National Guard died during the operation. The Attorney General of Venezuela, Tarek William Saab, called the action a “crushing blow” to organised crime. However, observers such as Humberto Prado, director of the Venezuelan Prisons Observatory (OPV), opined that the unusually quick success of the operation compared with previous prison interventions seemed suspicious. Tocorón was identified as the base of Héctor Guerrero Flores, leader Tren de Aragua; a gang with influence across regions and internationally. Flores, who had already served his sentence but nevertheless voluntarily remained in the prison, left it days before the operation, and his closest lieutenants also managed to escape. Prado claimed that he had received reports that the intervention had been discussed with Flores in advance. The intervention also coincided with international reports on possible human rights violations in Venezuela, leading some to speculate that motives extended beyond prison security.
