= Tarapacá migrant crisis =

2020s migrant crisis in northern Chile

Primarily affected localities by the 2021 migrant crisis.

In 2021, Tarapacá Region in northern Chile saw an unprecedented movement of foreign migrants into its territory. The Altiplano town of Colchane along the border with Bolivia has been the irregular point of entry of an estimate of 18,000 Venezuelan migrants and about 3,000 Bolivian migrants up to September.

The border crossed by most migrants is arid, cold and lies at 3,600 meters above sea level. This route is chosen since the more direct, and less harsh route across the Chile–Peru border is better guarded. Migrants are aided in the crossing by human smugglers. By February 2021 the cost for a family to be crossed into Chile was between 200 and US$500. Migrants have been accused by the alcalde of Colchane and local residents of acting violently by forcing themselves into inhabited houses of Colchane, engaging in theft and occupying public spaces. Reportedly by February 2021 1,600 migrants had arrived to the commune of Colchane in a brief time. Of these migrants, 400 Venezuelans were sent to Iquique to comply with mandatory COVID-19 quarantine.

According to data provided by the Jesuit Migrant Service by July 2021 the number of immigrants entering Chile through clandestine border crossings had exceeded those that did so in 2020 by 7,000, reaching a total of 23,673 people in 2021 up to July. As of September there are testimonies of the Chilean military guarding the frontier still being widely unable to control the influx of migrants. An estimate put the number of Venezuelans the crossed into Chile through Colchane in 2021 at 50,0000.

Chilean police moved on September 24 to oust migrants, including families, that had occupied Iquique's Plaza Brasil. With regards to the ousting of migrants from Plaza Brasil the national government representative for Tarapacá Region commented that it was an issue of the location having become a focii of "crime such as robbery, prostitution, small-scale drug traffic" with delinquents hiding among the people occupying the square.

On September 25 residents of Iquique organised a protest against the immigrants. During the protests an incident occurred in which a group of protesters sat the belongings of migrants afire. Chilean Public Ministry ordered an investigation to identify and prosecute the responsibles for the arson. Days after the events the ambassador of Venezuela to Chile Arévalo Méndez travelled to Iquique to offer migrants free flight tickets to Venezuela as part of the Back to homeland plan. Venezuelan migrants largely rejected the offer.

The Governor of Tarapacá José Miguel Carvajal accused President Sebastián Piñera of having abandoned his duties with regards to the migrant crisis. The Government of Chile pushed back the allegations claiming the number of migrants entering Chile in 2021 was as of September "about 25 thousand", only 10% of the number registered for 2017, the year prior to Piñera assuming office.

== Trafficking of women ==
Amidst the migrant crisis the Venezuelan criminal organisation Tren de Aragua engaged in trafficking of women across from the Bolivian border to Santiago. By October 2021 there were reports Chilean authorities were conducting four different investigations related to the criminal organisation. On March 24, 2022 Investigations Police of Chile (PDI) declared to have dismantled the Chilean branch of Tren de Aragua. One of the Tren de Aragua members captured in March 2022 had Interpol arrest warrants for murders in Venezuela and Peru. Six other migrant traffickers of Tren de Aragua were also captured in March 2022 by Chilean police.

== Background ==
Between 2015 and 2017, Venezuelan emigration to Chile increased by 1,388 percent. In 2016, Venezuelans emigrated to Chile due to its stable economy and simple immigration policy. According to the Chilean Department for Foreigners and Migration, the number of Chilean visas for Venezuelans increased from 758 in 2011 to 8,381 in 2016; 90 percent were work visas for Venezuelans aged 20 to 35. Since international travel by air is difficult (especially due to the value of the Venezuelan bolívar), many Venezuelans must travel overland through dangerous terrain to reach Chile. After arriving, they must start a new life. According to Catholic Chilean Migration Institute executive secretary Delio Cubides, most Venezuelan immigrants "are accountants, engineers, teachers, the majority of them very well-educated" but accept low-paying jobs so they can meet visa requirements and remain in the country.

== See also ==
- Chilenization of Tacna, Arica and Tarapacá
- Expulsion of Chileans from Bolivia and Peru in 1879
- Patriotic Leagues (Southern Cone)
