= Niño Guerrero =

Venezuelan gang leader (1983–2026)

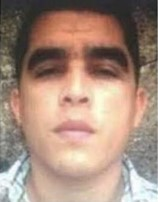
- Undated photo of Guerrero
- Born: Héctor Rusthenford Guerrero Flores; 2 December 1983; Maracay, Aragua, Venezuela
- Died: c. 12 June 2026 (aged 42); Bolívar, Venezuela
- Cause of death: Assassination by airstrike
- Occupation: Leader of Tren de Aragua
- Spouse: Wendy Ríos Gómez
- Convictions: Homicide, drug trafficking, money laundering, robbery, identity theft, conspiracy to commit a crime, illegal possession of weapons, and organized crime
- Penalty: 17 years in prison
- Reward amount: US$5 million
- Capture status: Deceased
- Wanted by: U.S Department of State, U.S. Immigration and Customs Enforcement, Federal Bureau of Investigation, Department of the Treasury, Chile, Peru
- Escaped: 1st escape: 28 August 2012; 2nd escape: September 2023

Details
- Span of crimes: 2000–2026
- Killed: 1+

Héctor Rusthenford "Niño" Guerrero Flores (2 December 1983 – c. 12 June 2026) was a Venezuelan drug trafficker and leader of Tren de Aragua. Along with Yohan José Romero and Larry Álvarez Núñez, he was one of the co-founders of the organization.

In 2010, he was captured while trafficking in stolen goods and drugs in Maracay. He was incarcerated at the Aragua Penitentiary Center, from which he escaped in 2012. In 2013, he was recaptured in Barquisimeto. In February 2018, he was sentenced to 17 years in prison for the crimes of homicide, drug trafficking, identity theft, and concealment of military-grade weapons, among other charges. From the Tocorón prison, Guerrero led the operations of Tren de Aragua, driving its expansion internationally. He escaped from it in 2023, when Venezuelan security forces carried out a major operation to retake control of the prison. On 12 June 2026, U.S. president Donald Trump announced that Guerrero was killed by airstrike during a joint assassination operation by Venezuela and the United States.

== Early life and crimes ==
Guerrero was born in 1983 in Maracay, Aragua. In 2000, the first incursions of Guerrero into illicit activities were recorded. In 2005, Guerrero attacked a police station, killing Corporal Oswaldo González. In 2010, he was caught while dealing in stolen goods and drugs in Maracay. He was interned in the Aragua Penitentiary Center, from which he escaped in 2012. In 2013 he was recaptured in Barquisimeto.

In 2015, he was captured with actress Jimena Araya in the San Vicente neighborhood of Maracay. Guerrero reportedly offered to rescue young people from drugs, bring peace, beautify the neighborhood, and not allow the police to be present.

== 2018 prison sentence ==
In February 2018, he was sentenced to 17 years in prison for the crimes of homicide regarding the killing of González, drug trafficking, identity theft, and concealment of weapons of war, among other charges. Guerrero led the operations of the Tren de Aragua from prison, promoting its expansion, taking advantage of the migratory exodus due to the economic crisis.

In September 2023, the Aragua Penitentiary Center was evacuated in the Cacique Guaicaipuro Liberation Operation that sought to retake control of the prison with 11,000 officials of the Bolivarian National Armed Forces (FANB) and police officers. A major of the Bolivarian National Guard died during the operation. It was reported that Guerrero escaped from the Aragua Penitentiary Center through a tunnel. According to the NGO Observador Venezolano to AFP, days before the event, Guerrero negotiated the intervention in the Tocorón prison with the Venezuelan government and, benefiting from the complicity of the security forces, escaped before the operation began, a claim that was denied by the Venezuelan government. Between 400 and 500 inmates escaped with Guerrero from the Tocorón Penitentiary. The Venezuelan government confirmed the escape three days later. According to the Venezuelan Observatory of Prisons, the prison had a capacity for 750 inmates, but it housed more than 5,000. Authorities said there were about 1,600 prisoners at the time of the intervention. Inside the prison they found 14 long and two short weapons, 120 7.62×51 link belts, 40 anti-tank grenades, 80 kilos of C4 composition, 80 full devices, 400,000 rounds of ammunition of different calibers, 15 self-propelled rockets, and other war materials.

The prison complex controlled by the Tren de Aragua caught the attention of the international media as it had a swimming pool, discotheque, bars, restaurants, playground, pig and chicken farms, a baseball stadium, and a zoo, which were built during the years of Guerrero's leadership. Tunnels to enter and exit freely were also discovered, which Guerrero used to escape from the prison. After the intervention, a network of tunnels about 5 km long was found, which flowed into Lake Valencia, where rudimentary boats were found. The cavities had ventilation, lighting, and concrete frames.

After his escape, he reportedly went into hiding in Las Claritas, a mining town in Bolívar near the border with Guyana, under the protection of senior Tren de Aragua leader Yohan José Romero.

== Peruvian and Chilean arrest warrants ==
The Peruvian Ministry of the Interior issued a statement announcing that it was offering a reward of 500,000 soles (US$132,400) in exchange for information leading to Guerrero's whereabouts. Authorities included Guerrero Flores in Peru's Rewards Program. The statement added that Minister Vicente Romero made the announcement following a decision by a rewards commission on a report by Peru's National Police indicating that Niño Guerrero may have entered Peruvian territory in a hidden manner.

A week after the Venezuelan government's intervention in the Tocorón prison, on 21 September, Chile's national prosecutor's office issued an arrest warrant for Guerrero. The order, issued by the Public Ministry of Tarapacá, allowed the Chilean State to circulate an extradition request through its Foreign Ministry if, for instance, Guerrero had been captured in another country and was being tried in local courts.

== US v. Nicolás Maduro indictment ==
In January 2026, after the attack by the United States against Venezuela, Guerrero was named one of six codefendants in a grand jury federal indictment, together with Venezuelan president Nicolás Maduro, Maduro's wife and son, and two Venezuelan politicians. The statutory allegations against Guerrero included conspiracy to manufacture, distribute, and import controlled substances, namely cocaine; manufacturing, distribution, and importing said substances; possession of machine guns and destructive devices; and use of firearms in furtherance of crime.

== Death ==
Footage posted on Truth Social by U.S. president Donald Trump of the airstrike that killed Guerrero

On 12 June 2026, U.S. president Donald Trump announced that Guerrero was killed in a "swift and lethal kinetic strike" at the age of 42, conducted by the U.S. Southern Command in coordination with the Venezuelan government, describing him as a terrorist. U.S. defense secretary Pete Hegseth said on X the strike took place earlier in the week on a Tren de Aragua compound in Venezuela. The following day, the Venezuelan government confirmed that Guerrero was killed during a joint operation in Bolívar, during which intelligence was exchanged between the two countries. During the operation, clashes occurred with gang members located in the area.
