= 2019 Venezuelan uprising attempt =

Failed attempt to overthrow Nicolás Maduro

- Part of the Venezuelan presidential crisis and the Crisis in Venezuela
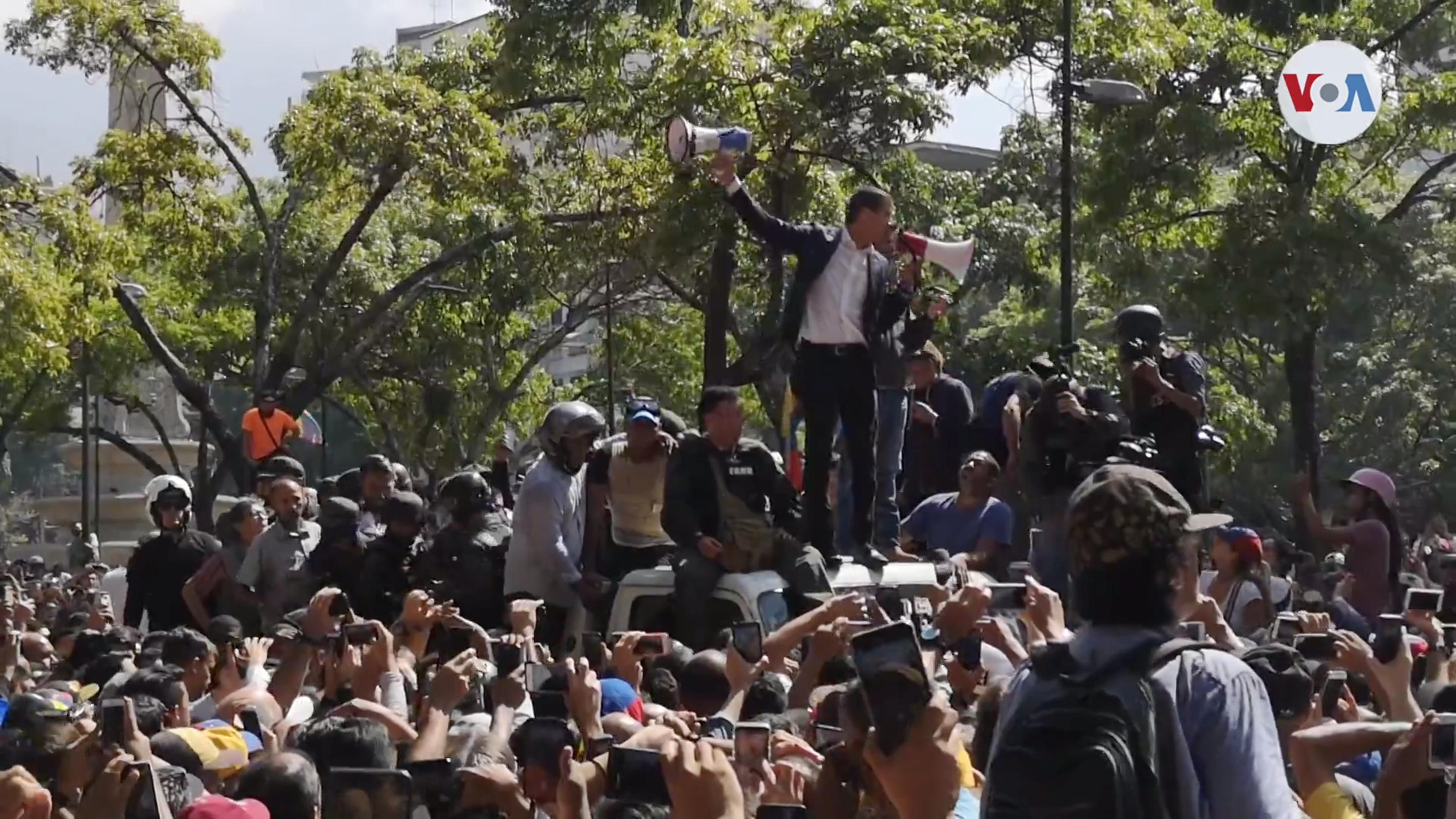
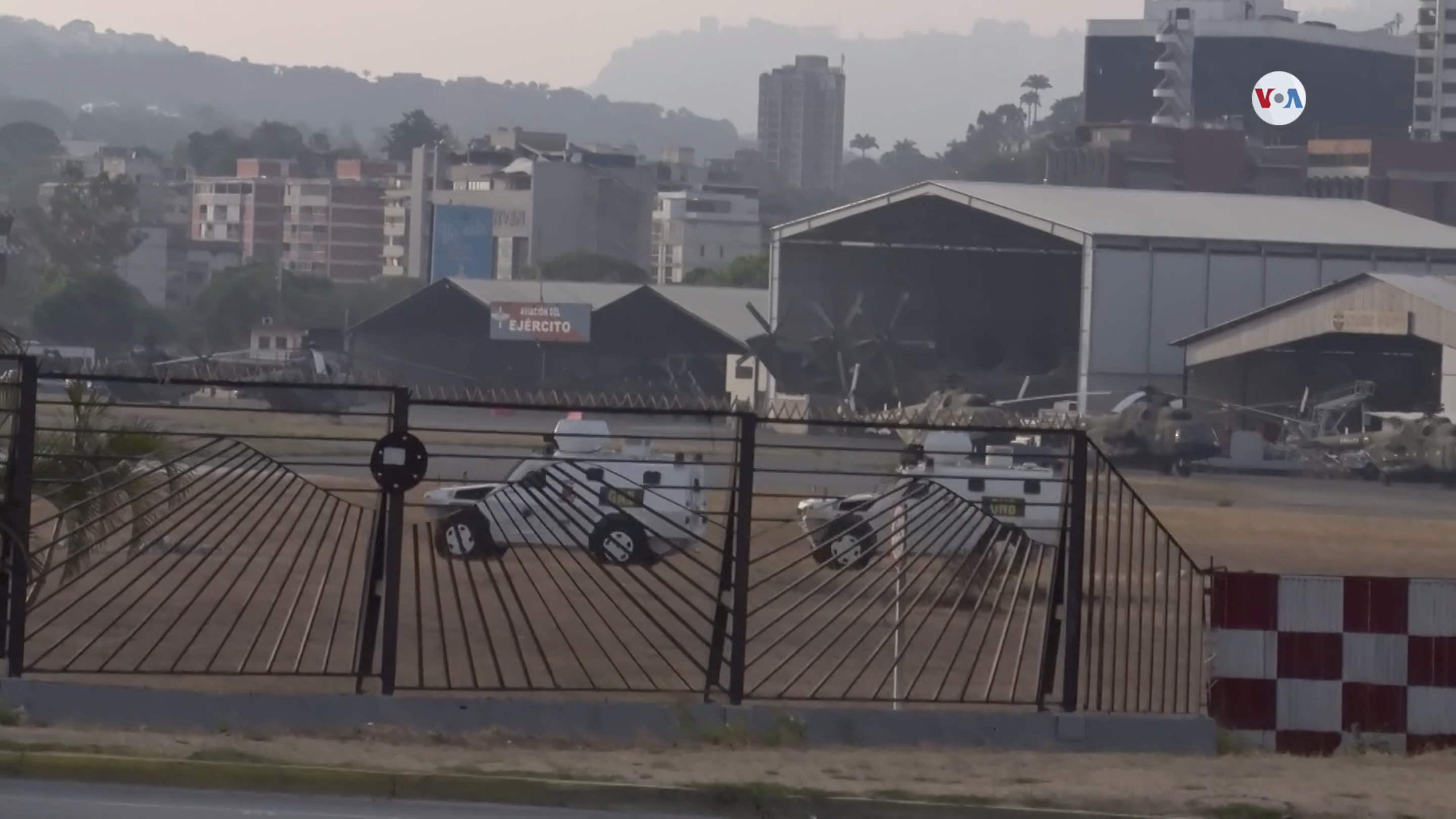
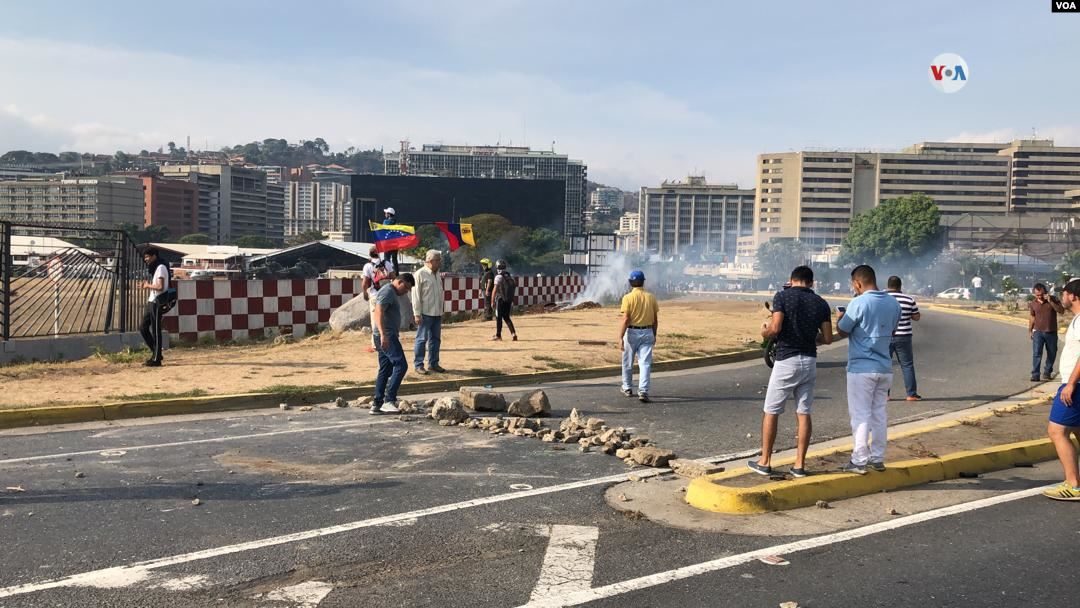
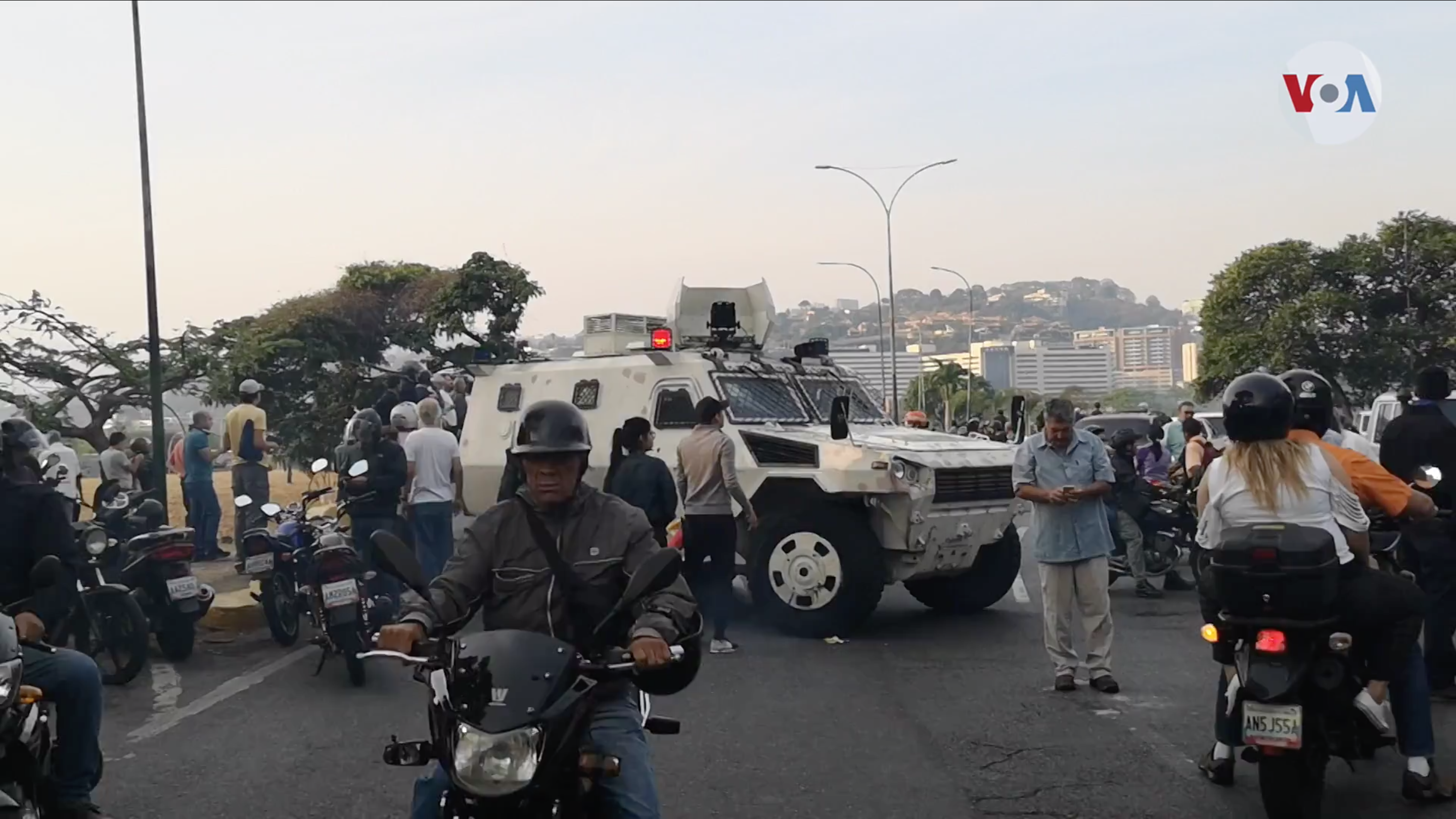
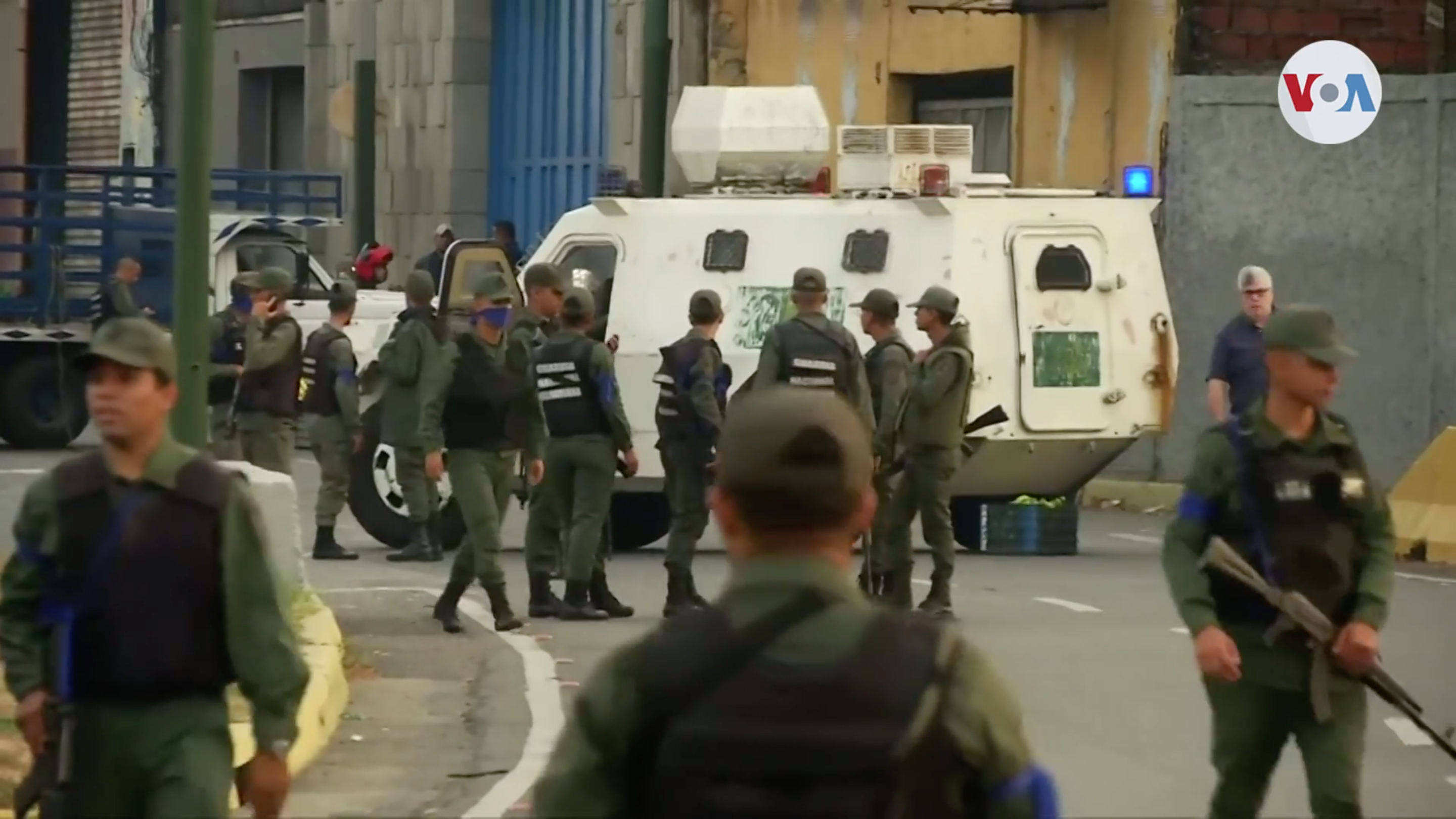
- Top to bottom, left to right: Juan Guaidó speaking to supporters, pro-Maduro VN-4s responding to protests, pro-Guaidó protesters at La Carlota Air Base, pro-Guaidó VN-4 supporting protests, pro-Guaidó forces gathered
- Date: 30 April 2019
- Location: Venezuela
- Result: Unsuccessful: Army largely remains loyal to Maduro; Leopoldo López is freed from house arrest, enters Spanish embassy in Caracas; Head of SEBIN Manuel Cristopher Figuera breaks ranks with the Maduro government; Pro-Maduro institutions ANC and TSJ revoke parliamentary immunity of 11 National Assembly deputies; National Assembly Vice President Edgar Zambrano is arrested by SEBIN on 8 May and released 4 months later

Parties
Maduro forces: Bolivarian National Armed Forces; Bolivarian Intelligence Service; Colectivos; La Piedrita; Pro-Maduro counter-protesters	Guaidó forces: Military defectors; Pro-Guaidó protesters

Lead figures
Nicolás Maduro: (Venezuela) Diosdado Cabello; (Venezuela) Delcy Rodríguez	Juan Guaidó: (Venezuela) Edgar Zambrano; (Venezuela) Leopoldo López; (Venezuela) Manuel Cristopher Figuera

Number
Unknown	Dozens of National Guardsmen Thousands of protesters

Casualties and losses
5 officials wounded	4 killed 230 wounded 205 arrested

On 30 April 2019, during the Venezuelan presidential crisis, a group of several dozen military personnel and civilians joined Juan Guaidó in his call for the removal of Nicolás Maduro as part of what he labeled "Operation Freedom" (Spanish: Operación Libertad). Reuters reported an "uneasy peace" by the afternoon of 30 April. During the unrest, opposition leader Leopoldo López was freed from house arrest after being imprisoned for five years. Manuel Cristopher Figuera, the head of the Bolivarian Intelligence Service, denounced the Maduro government and was dismissed from his position before going into hiding. At least 25 military men who opposed Maduro sought asylum at the Brazilian embassy in Caracas.

In a joint statement, the Lima Group shared support for Guaidó and called for Maduro's exit. Maduro, along with some academics and media outlets, described the actions of Guaidó and his allies as an attempted coup d'état, while other media organizations described the actions as an uprising. Maduro expelled 54 members from the military and the head of intelligence who publicly backed Guaidó. Guaidó's efforts to persuade senior military officials to join his movement failed, with Guaidó stating that going forward, protests would be held every day until Maduro stepped down from power. Guaidó called for his supporters and the country's armed forces to take to the streets again the following day.

By May 2nd, four people were killed in the ensuing clashes between opposition protesters and militants on one side, and pro-government protesters and the Venezuelan armed forces on the other. Some National Assembly members had their immunity lifted and were indicted afterwards; several of those indicted, while others went into hiding. Additionally, the National Assembly vice-president Edgar Zambrano was later arrested.

== Background ==
A power struggle concerning who is the legitimate President of Venezuela began on 10 January 2019, when the opposition-majority National Assembly declared that incumbent Nicolás Maduro's 2018 re-election was invalid; that the office of the President of Venezuela was therefore vacant; and declared its president, Juan Guaidó, to be acting president of the nation. As of May 2019, Guaidó has been recognized as the interim president of Venezuela by 54 countries, including the United States and most nations of Latin America and Europe. Internationally, support has followed usual geopolitical lines: Russia, China, Iran, Syria, Turkey, and Cuba support Maduro, while the United States, Canada, and most of Europe and Latin America support Guaidó as interim president.

The process and results of the May 2018 Venezuelan presidential election were widely disputed. The National Assembly declared Maduro illegitimate on the day of his second inauguration, citing the 1999 Constitution of Venezuela enacted under Hugo Chávez, Maduro's predecessor; in response, the pro-Maduro Supreme Tribunal of Justice said the National Assembly's declaration was unconstitutional. Minutes after Maduro took the oath as president of Venezuela on 10 January 2019, the Organization of American States (OAS) approved a resolution in a special session of its Permanent Council declaring Maduro's presidency illegitimate and urging new elections. Special meetings of the OAS on 24 January and in the United Nations Security Council on 26 January were held but no consensus was reached. Secretary-General of the United Nations António Guterres called for dialogue.

Maduro's government states that the crisis is a "coup d'état led by the United States to topple him and control the country's oil reserves". Guaidó denies the coup allegations, saying peaceful volunteers back his movement.

On 21 January 2019, a small-scale attempted military mutiny occurred in the Cotiza neighborhood, Caracas, where 27 military officials kidnapped security and stole weapons, trying to march on Miraflores, who fought against and were apprehended by authorities in the early hours. People in the local area continued the fight, protesting and burning things in the street even as tear gas was deployed.

Guaidó announced on 16 March 2019 that he would embark on a tour of the country to organize committees for what he called "Operation Freedom" with the goal to claim the presidential residence, Miraflores Palace. From the first rally in Carabobo state, he said, "We will be in each state of Venezuela and for each state we have visited the responsibility will be yours, the leaders, the united, [to] organize ourselves in freedom commands."

In an open assembly celebrating the anniversary of the 19 April 1810 date when the Venezuelan Independence Movement began, Guaidó offered the example that organized protests in Sudan led to the replacement of Omar al-Bashir, and called for "the greatest march" in history on 1 May, to "once and for all end this tragedy". Coinciding with his speech, NetBlocks stated that state-run CANTV again blocked access to social media in Venezuela.

United States National Security Adviser John R. Bolton indicated in a press conference that Defense Minister Vladimir Padrino López, Supreme Court president Maikel Moreno, and the head of Maduro's Presidential Guard, Iván Hernández Dala had been talking with the opposition over the last three months about a peaceful transition, and had agreed that Maduro needed to go.

Juan Forero reported that more than a dozen sources close to the negotiations told The Wall Street Journal that meetings between key opposition figures and Maduro government officials had taken place in Panama, the Dominican Republic and Colombia for two months, "trying to cut a deal for a peaceful transfer of power" that was not to be accomplished via a military coup, "but rather through a court ruling that would permit the military to step away from Mr. Maduro and put the country on a path back to democracy". According to The Wall Street Journal, the Supreme Court, of which Moreno is the highest official, "was to recognize the opposition-controlled National Assembly, the last democratically elected body in Venezuela, as the legitimate representative of the Venezuelan people. The armed forces would then have legal grounds to abandon Mr. Maduro. The defense minister, Vladimir Padrino López, and others who were negotiating with the opposition, would join the new government." When Leopoldo López and Guaidó called for an uprising a day early, support was withdrawn for unclear reasons; Forero writes, "It isn't known whether they [pulled out of the pact] because counterintelligence agents had discovered the plot or because key actors on the government side never had any intention of pulling their support for Mr. Maduro."

Anthony Faiola reports a similar account in The Washington Post, based on extensive interviews with three unnamed sources, who indicated that "the plotters were counting on Moreno to provide a vital lever to sway the military to their cause: a legal ruling that would have effectively acknowledged Guaidó as interim president and led to new elections". The Washington Post says it saw the draft ruling which was to be issued on 29 April by the Supreme Court; the ruling would withdraw recognition of the pro-Maduro Constituent National Assembly, reinstate the opposition-majority National Assembly ("widely recognized internationally as Venezuela's only democratic institution"), call for elections, and make provisions for political prisoners. With the Supreme Court issuing this ruling, the armed forces would have a legal basis to "force Maduro to step down without a single bullet being fired", in a "sequenced chain of official statements" that was not meant to be a coup. According to the sources, Moreno suggested that he be the person to replace Maduro, and inquired about security for himself and his family. Manuel Cristopher Figuera, the Director General of Venezuela's National Intelligence Service (SEBIN), supplied information, according to this account, at 1 am on 30 April that he was to be replaced as head of SEBIN, Leopoldo López was to be sent back to prison, and the "government was preparing to take unspecified action against Guaidó and other senior opposition leaders". The opposition decided to act on 30 April instead of 1 May.

Venezuelan investigative journal Armando.Info and The Wall Street Journal reported that Venezuelan businessman Raúl Gorrín was involved in the plot for his close connection to Moreno, Padrino López and counter-intelligence chief Iván Hernández. After the events of 30 April, Christopher Figuera fled to the US and declared in an interview with The Washington Post, that Gorrín was the one that approached US authorities with the plan in order to have the sanctions on him lifted. César Omaña, another Venezuelan businessman living in Miami, was the one that contacted Cristopher Figuera to recruit him, according to the interview. Omaña has not been sanctioned and had close ties with Hugo Chávez daughters and senior Maduro officials. Omaña and Christopher Figuera started a series of negotiations, parallel to Gorrín's plan to convince Moreno. Moreno had demanded ten million dollars, to secure his position in the Supreme Court, and a safety net for himself. The plotters carried code names, Christopher Figuera was "Black Panther", Omaña was "Superman" and Mauricio Claver-Carone, the U.S. National Security Council's director for Latin American policy, was "Child eater" (Spanish: Comeniños), according to the interview. Opposition officials said that the plan was moved from 1 May to 30 April because Guaidó might be arrested, Christopher Figuera denies it. Christopher Figuera claims that he was the one who accelerated the timetable to avoid a large scale attack of paramilitary forces (colectivos) that was prepared for the 1st May. According to Christopher Figuera, Padrino López was against moving forward the date. Maduro, Moreno and Padrino López have denied publicly their role in the plot.

After Leopoldo López left Venezuela in October 2020, he reaffirmed Maikel Moreno's involvement in the operation.

== Events ==
=== Release of López and call for uprising ===
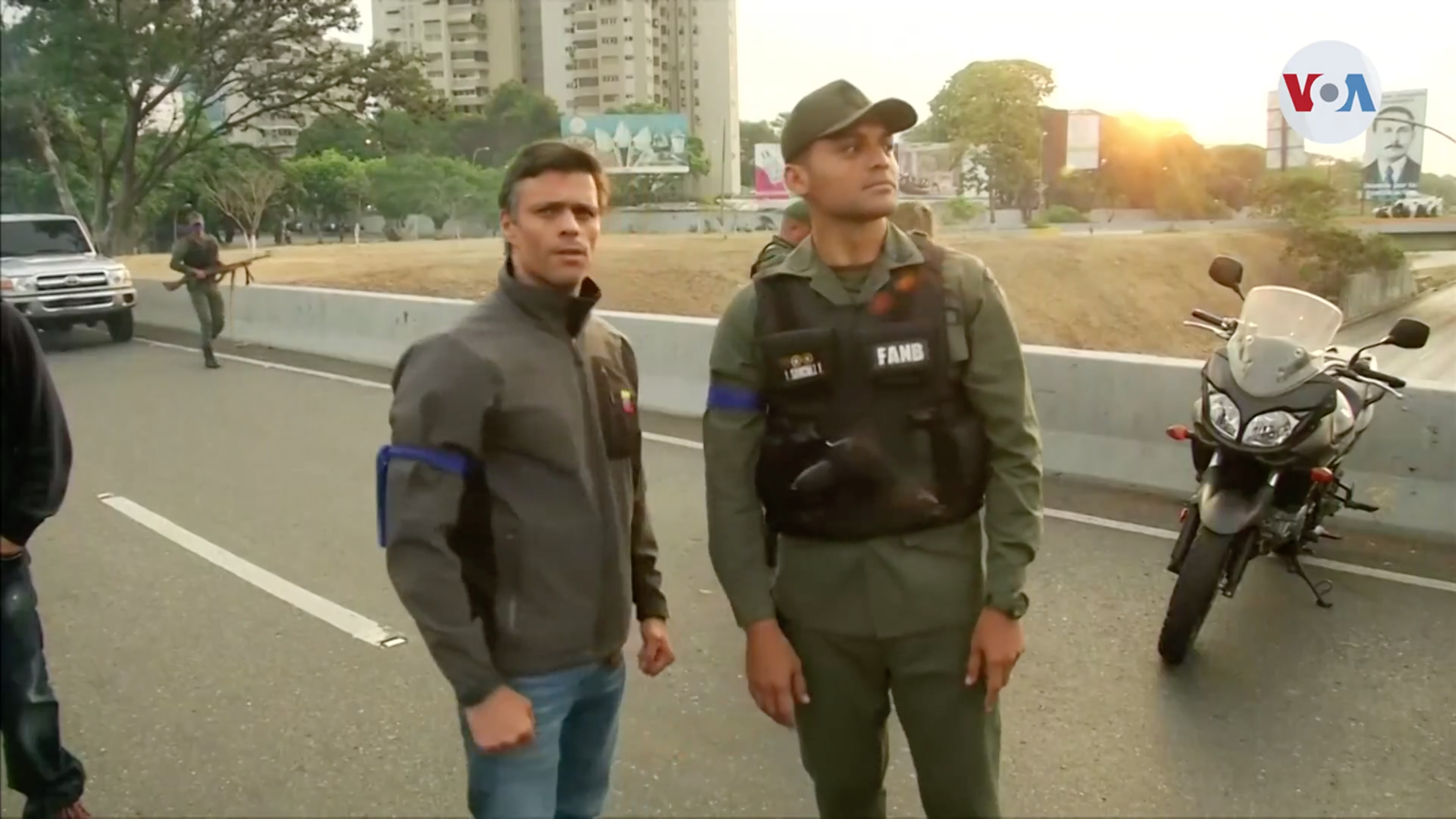
Leopoldo López beside lieutenant colonel Illich Sánchez following his release

At 2:00 am VET, lieutenant colonel Illich Sánchez of the Bolivarian National Guard, gathered his troops, stating "When I gathered my troops ... and told them we were going to liberate Venezuela they broke down in tears". Sánchez was the commander of 500 troops throughout Caracas who were tasked with protecting government buildings such as Miraflores Palace, and the Palacio Federal Legislativo. Dozens of troops would later report that they were "tricked" by an officer to participate in Guaidó's effort. Shortly after, Sánchez's troops freed opposition leader Leopoldo López — Guaidó's mentor and Venezuela's "most prominent opposition activist", according to the Associated Press — who had been under house arrest since 2014.

At approximately 5:00 am, large vehicles accompanied by members of the National Bolivarian Armed Forces of Venezuela blocked portions of the Francisco Fajardo Highway. At 5:46 am VET, Guaidó live-streamed a video on Periscope of himself beside López, with the two flanked by members of the Venezuelan armed forces from the Altamira Overpass, near La Carlota Air Force Base in Caracas. Guaidó titled the initiative "Operation Freedom", and stated: "People of Venezuela, it is necessary that we go out together to the street, to support the democratic forces and to recover our freedom. Organized and together, mobilize the main military units. People of Caracas, all to La Carlota".

López, his wife Lilian Tintori and their daughter would later enter the Chilean embassy in Caracas, and move again to the Spanish embassy for protection.

After Guaidó's announcement, NetBlocks reported that multiple social media and news websites were censored by the state-run CANTV internet provider. The internet outage was similar to the regular disruptions that have occurred in other important political conflicts in 2019. The signal of BBC World News and CNN would also be taken off the air, and the local radio station Radio Caracas Radio was broken into and shut down by the telecommunications authority.

=== Clashes ===
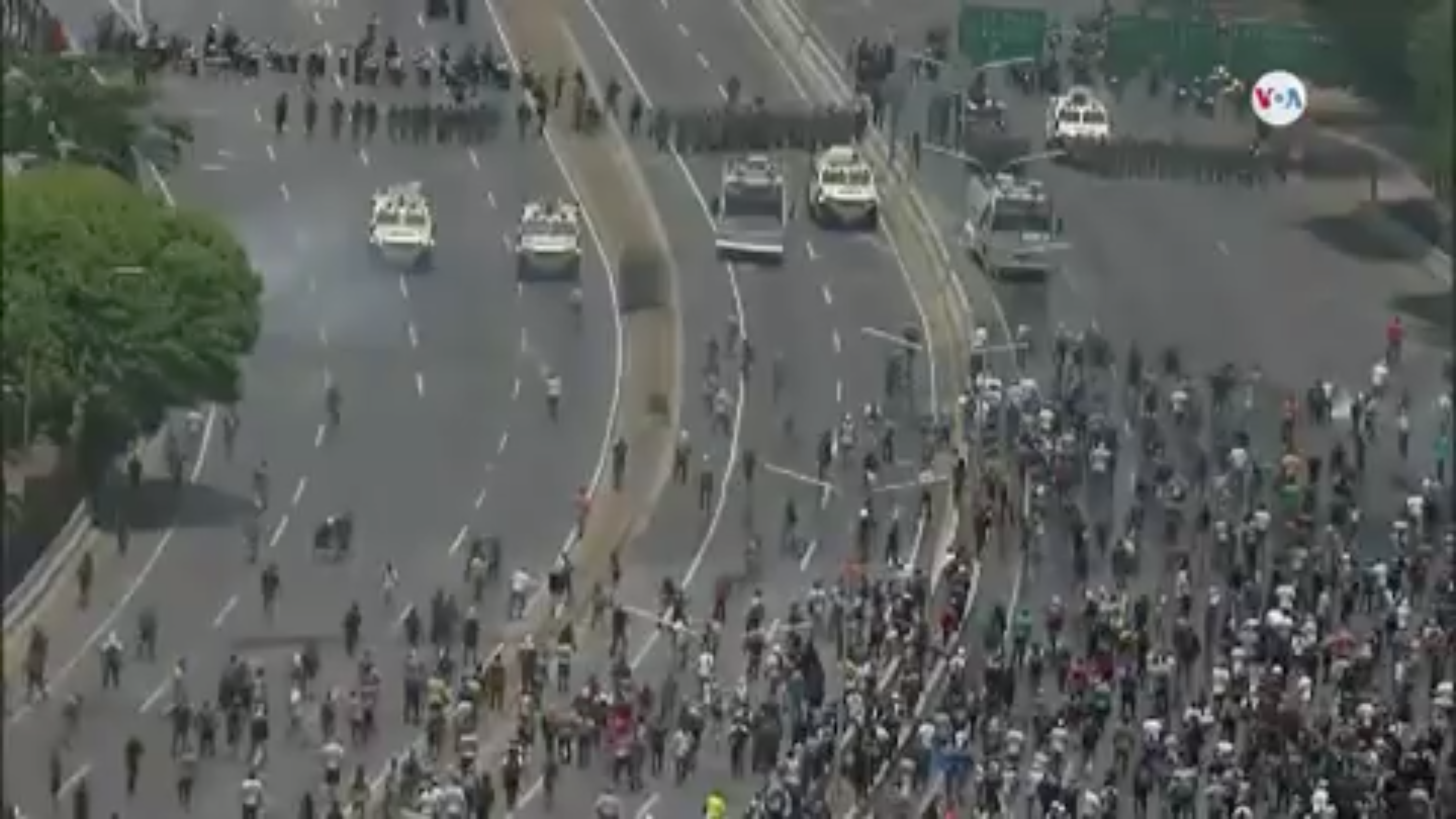
Clashes between pro-Guaidó protesters and pro-Maduro authorities

Minister of Information Jorge Rodríguez released a statement by 6:30 am that the Maduro government was beginning to disperse forces loyal to Guaidó. At the same time, access to Miraflores Palace was barricaded, and forces loyal to Maduro took up positions in the surrounding area. Military forces loyal to Guaidó outfitted their uniforms with blue cloth.

At 6:44 am, tear gas fired from troops within La Carlota Air Force Base dispersed some forces loyal to Guaidó near the facility. Vice President of the United Socialist Party of Venezuela, Diosdado Cabello, called for supporters to gather at Miraflores Palace to defend Maduro.

Guaidó left the area near La Carlota around 8:00 am, leading a march heading west. Valentín Santana, leader of La Piedrita colectivo, stated at 8:30 am that "it was time to defend the revolution with weapons", calling for support of Maduro. At approximately 8:39 am, heavy gunfire erupted as pro-Maduro armed colectivos fired rounds while riding motorbikes near La Carlota.

Pro-Guaidó protesters attempted to enter the main gate of La Carlota at 9:10 am. The Caracas Metro ceased operations at 9:15 am citing security reasons. Forces loyal to Maduro dispersed protesters from the gates of La Carlota at 9:43 am.

At 11:00 am, Maduro's Prosecutor General Tarek William Saab spoke on state-run television saying that Guaidó and his supporters would face "consequences". A National Guardsman loyal to Maduro was injured by a gunshot to the neck at 11:08 am. By 11:12 am, protesters near La Carlota begin to largely disperse and injured begin to appear in clinics minutes later. At 11:42 am, armored VN-4s driven by Maduro loyalists begin to attack protesters, with some protesters being run over by the vehicles.

Following a speech at noon, Guaidó turned his group of protesters, along with armed National Guardsmen loyal to Guaidó, towards western Caracas where numerous government facilities and the Miraflores presidential palace is located. The march in support of Guaidó halted in Chacao around 1:41 pm after armed colectivos emerged from the Ministry of Transportation building, firing upon the demonstration. A woman was wounded by the gunfire. Minutes later, officers of the Miranda State Police and Chacao Municipal Police confronted the colectivos with a gunfight ensuing. The following day, the police officers that confronted the colectivos were ordered to hand over their service weapons and informed that an investigation by a police oversight body against them was opened.

=== Movement dissolves ===
Minor clashes occurred throughout the day following the dispersal of the march. News that the National Guard blocked the march from progressing and that López's family had sought refuge in the Embassy of Chile resulted with protests dissipating. By the evening hours, only small groups of protesters persisted in Caracas.

As Guaidó loyalists learned that high-ranking officials close to Maduro refused to turn, confusion began to spread. Rebels under command of lieutenant colonel Sánchez began to seek refuge as the plan failed. Troops then removed their uniforms while traveling throughout Caracas on motorcycle, knocking on the doors of foreign embassies asking for protection. López was then able to contact President Juan Carlos Varela of Panama, who granted 16 troops loyal to Guaidó permission to stay at Panama's embassy in Caracas. The group would stay in the embassy for the next seven months until they were released during a "military operation" performed by friendly troops in December 2019, which resulted in the group fleeing from the country.

== Aftermath ==
On the evening of 30 April, Maduro addressed the nation from Miraflores Palace, accompanied by high-level officials of his government and the armed forces. Maduro stated that an attempted "coup d'etat" occurred and congratulated supporters who "led the defeat of the small group that tried to fill Venezuela with violence". Maduro, discussing the day's events, stated "We have been facing various forms of coup d'etat, due to the obsessive efforts of the Venezuelan right, the Colombian oligarchy and the US empire".

In the days after the event, Guaidó conceded that the opposition's plan did not work and that they mistook their support from the military and high-level officials, stating "Maybe because we still need more soldiers, maybe we need more officials of the regime to be willing to support it, to back the constitution, ... I think the variables are obvious at this point". Guaidó further stated that protests and calls for defections would continue, saying that the opposition has "been doing this for 20 years" and that "[g]etting frustrated and tired is part of it, but Venezuelans have demonstrated that they always take the fight again when they have to". CNN reported that the "uprising faltered, having apparently failed to gain the support of senior members of the Venezuelan military".

On the other hand, Leopoldo López stated that his liberation was only the first step in an ongoing phase and had no turning back. Some members of Venezuela's opposition have held López responsible for the failure of the uprising, saying that his unexpected appearance before the media during the event was an unhelpful performance to construct a positive public image awhich disrupted detailed plans, scaring away possible defectors.

=== Arrests and casualties ===
Demonstrators protested "across the nation" on 30 April, with violence in more than five states, and demonstrations in every state. Vladimir Padrino, Maduro's Defense Minister, stated that the government was prepared to use weapons if necessary to deactivate the "attempted coup".

A National Guard armoured personnel carrier ran over protesters, captured on video "accelerating directly into a group of antigovernment protesters". By the end of 30 April, over 100 were injured; the majority were hit by rubber bullets, and two had gunshot wounds. Salud Chacao reported having attended 69 injured. One 25-year-old man died when he was shot in the chest during a protest in the interior state of Aragua. The Maduro government stated that five National Guardsmen and police officers were injured. A physician in a Caracas clinic stated that they had enough medical supplies for emergency care, partly because of recent efforts to bring humanitarian aid to the country.

The NGO Foro Penal denounced the arrests of military personnel as forced disappearances; security forces have refused to give information to their relatives and lawyers.

In May 2019, Supreme Tribunal of Justice (TSJ) ordered the prosecution of seven National Assembly members (Note: The seven members are: José Calzadilla, Luis Florido, Mariela Magallanes, Américo De Grazia, Richard Blanco, Henry Ramos Allup and Edgar Zambrano. The Edgar Zambrano order of prosecution was announced some days before the other six. Initially, the TSJ list included Andrés Delgado Velásquez but the name was later scrapped.) for their actions. The National Assembly dismissed the sentence, holding that the members of the Tribunal are illegitimate and their ruling violates the parliamentary immunity of the deputies. National Assembly vice president Edgar Zambrano was arrested on 8 May, signaling a crackdown. With these seven deputies charged with "treason, conspiracy, instigation of insurrection, civil rebellion, criminal conspiracy, usurpation of functions, and public instigation to the disobedience of the laws", an El País article stated that the Venezuelan parliament, elected to a majority in the 2015 elections, has been "systematically blocked" and dismembered by "political persecution" of 60% of its elected members. (Note: Among the elected deputies in exile are Julio Borges, Gaby Arellano, José Manuel Olivares, Rosmit Mantilla, Dinorah Figuera, Sonia Medina, Ismael García, Germán Ferrer and Adriana D'Elia. Freddy Guevara is in the Chilean embassy. Gilber Caro is among those arrested. Juan Requesens is imprisoned.) There was no preliminary merit hearing as required by law; an additional three deputies were indicted without a preliminary merit hearing. (Note: Freddy Superlano, Sergio Vergara and Juan Andrés Mejía were also indicted.)

The recently sanctioned members sought refuge in foreign embassies. Richard Blanco from Fearless People's Alliance (Spanish: Alianza Bravo Pueblo) entered Argentina's embassy on 9 May. Hours later, Américo De Grazia from Radical Cause (Spanish: La Causa Radical) sought refuge at Italy's embassy, according to three sources close to him. Mariela Magallanes also took refuge in the Italian embassy.

=== Defections ===
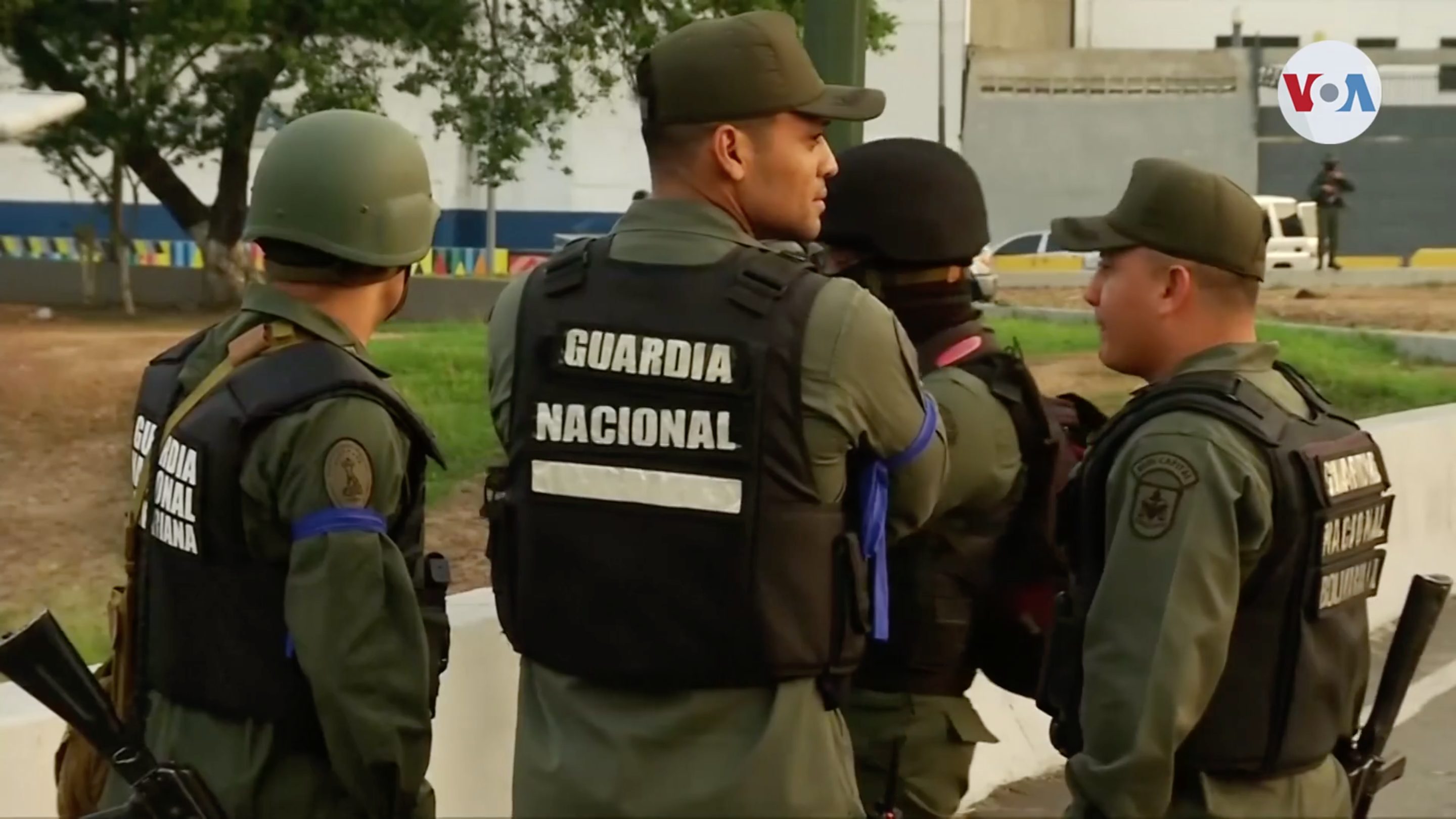
National Guard defectors with blue armbands, symbolizing support for Guaidó

Manuel Cristopher Figuera publicly criticized Maduro and corruption in his government, yet recognized him as president and a "good man" ("un hombre bueno"). Cristopher Figuera stated that Diosdado Cabello, Delcy Rodríguez, Jorge Rodríguez, Tareck El Aissami, Maikel Moreno and Vladimir Padrino López continued supporting Maduro in order to maintain their power and status. After the uprising attempt, he was dismissed by Maduro and his whereabouts were unknown. Maduro announced he would reinstate Gustavo González López as the SEBIN head.

While under house arrest, Leopoldo López reportedly held meetings with military and high-level officials close to Maduro, allegedly promising that they would maintain some positions in a transitional government and would not face criminal prosecution if they assisted Maduro's removal. Some suggested that these officials served as double agents in order to support Maduro and disrupt the rebellion attempt.

Maduro expelled 54 members from the military in addition to Cristopher Figuera, who backed Guaidó, among them, "five lieutenant coronels, four majors, four captains, six first lieutenants and 35 sergeants"; 25 military personnel sought asylum in the Brazilian embassy in Caracas. According to Voice of America, experts in the United States believe that "there is still a long way to go" for Guaidó to find support among the armed forces, stating that the Atlantic Council described the defection of National Guardsmen as "significant, but insufficient".

=== Foreign intervention ===
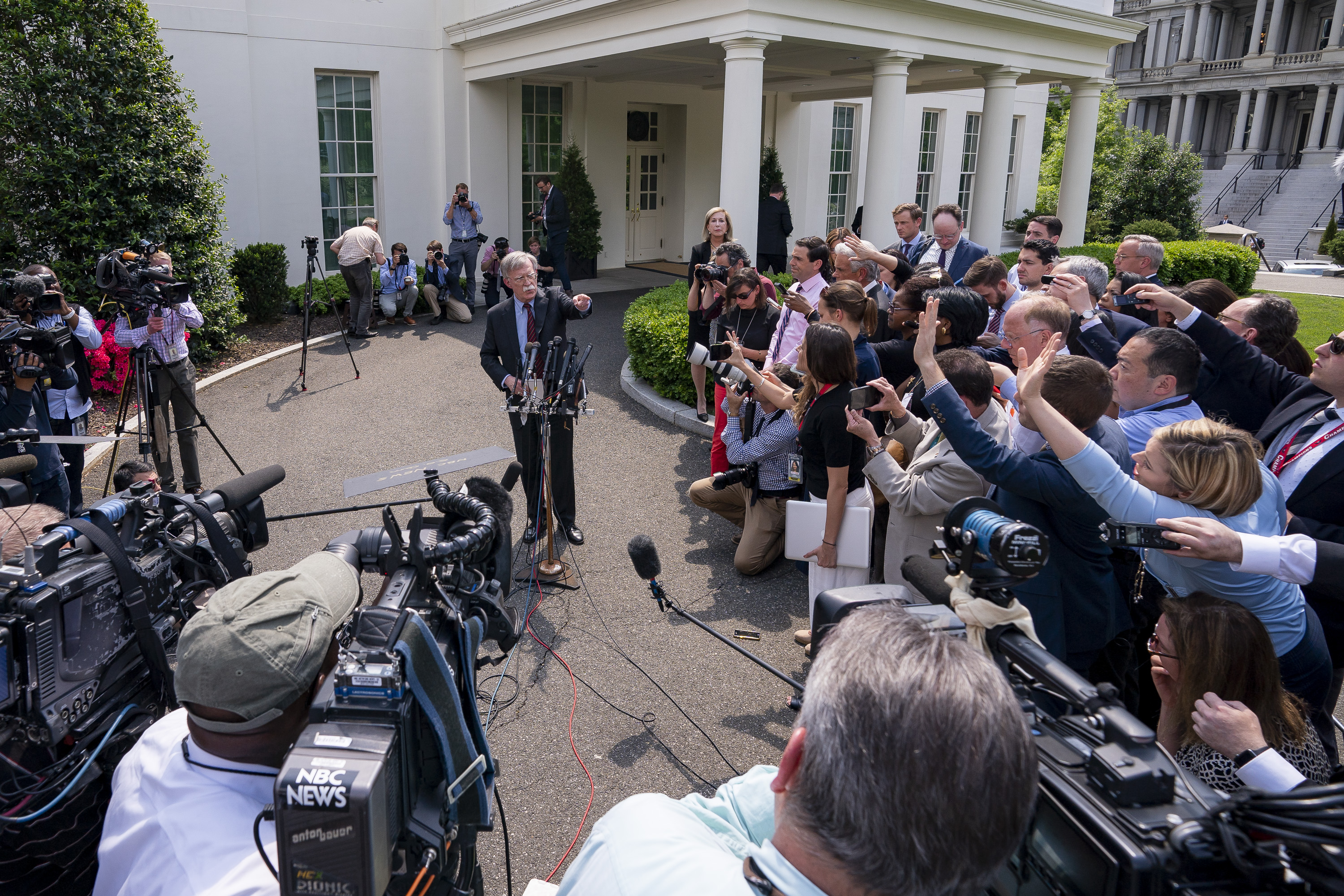
US National Security Adviser John Bolton speaks to press outside the White House on 30 April

Unnamed sources told CNN that the United States Department of State was caught off guard by Guaidó's decision to launch the "final phase" a day earlier than expected. US President Donald Trump expressed frustration that "some aides are more openly teasing military intervention", according to CNN, and expressed skepticism about the reliability of US intelligence that suggested that senior Maduro allies were preparing to defect.

Bolton stated that Cuba and Russia likely helped prop Maduro up during the day, and U.S. President Donald Trump threatened to bring "highest-level" sanctions on Cuba for its alleged role. The New York Times wrote that Bolton "said important officials in the Maduro administration have been in communication with the opposition and had committed to achieving the transfer of power from Mr. Maduro to Mr. Guaidó", despite Moreno and Padrino both speaking out in support of Maduro.

United States Secretary of State Mike Pompeo stated that Russia stopped plans underway for Maduro to exit Venezuela; Pompeo said Maduro had a plane waiting on the tarmac to take him to Cuba, but Russia convinced him to stay. Maduro, Russia, and some members of the opposition denied that Maduro attempted to flee Venezuela, with the Russian Foreign Ministry stating, "Washington tried its best to demoralize the Venezuelan army and now use[s] fakes as a part of information war". On 1 May, Pompeo stated "Military action is possible. If that's what's required, that's what the United States will do". CNN reported that the Trump administration is seeking ways to give Guaidó control of more Venezuelan assets in the U.S., to help get funding and humanitarian aid to the country.

=== Demonstrations ===
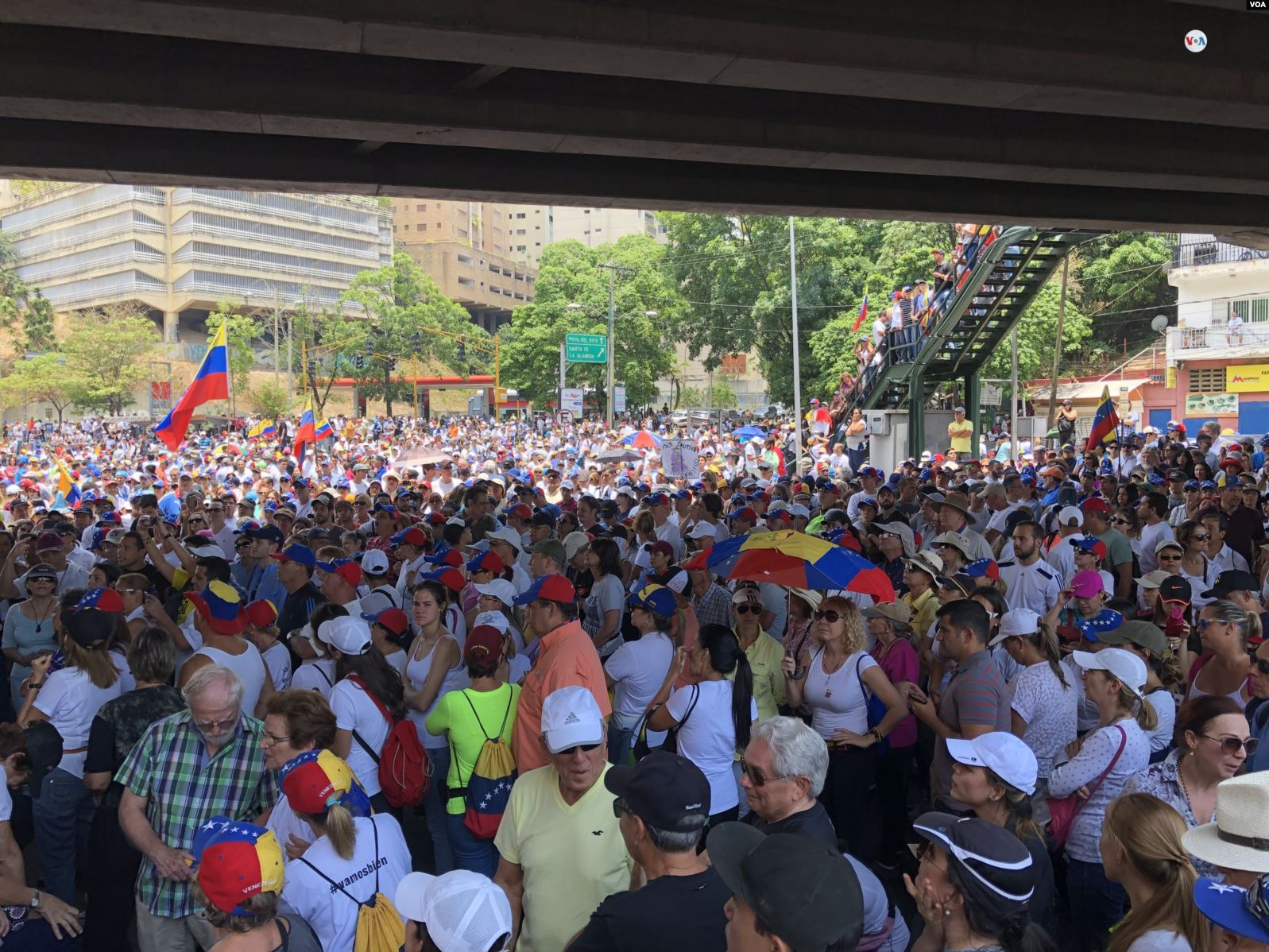
Protests in favor of the uprising, on 1 May.

A second day of protests occurred, in support of both Maduro and Guaidó, with the two leaders drawing in large numbers of Venezuelans.

Judge Marisela Godoy walked out of a Venezuela Supreme Court (TSJ) hearing on 1 May that was to rule on the events of 30 April without the justices having access to the content of the ruling; Godoy said this had become a customary process in the TSJ, and she encouraged her colleagues to protest.

Thousands to tens of thousands of supporters showed up for demonstrations on 1 May for Guaidó. (Note: The Guardian says tens of thousands; The Washington Post says thousands; The New York Times says thousands.) A smaller number attended Maduro's rival protest. (Note: The New York Times says thousands; The Washington Post says "A pro-government rally on Wednesday next to Miraflores, the presidential palace, drew about 500 people, far fewer than the multiple rallies of thousands of people supporting Guaidó.") According to The New York Times, most Maduro supporters "appeared to be retirees or public sector workers" and many were "brought in from across the country by public buses". According to the BBC, "For years, state employees have been told that if they did not turn up at government rallies, they would lose their jobs." The protests supporting Maduro were mainly working-class Venezuelans. During a speech, Guaidó called for continued protests in the coming days and the possibility of a general strike. The National Guard dispersed many pro-Guaidó demonstrations at their starting points.

Guaidó's call for the largest march in history did not materialize and his supporters were forced to retreat by security forces using tear gas. Colectivos fired on protestors with live ammunition, and one protester was shot in the head and killed. Human Rights Watch "said it believed that security forces fired shotgun pellets at demonstrators and journalists". Guaidó acknowledged he had received insufficient military backing, but added that "Maduro did not have the support nor the respect of the Armed Forces", and called for strikes beginning on 2 May, with the aim of a general strike later in the month. Russia and the U.S. each charged the other with interference in another country's affairs.

As of 2 May, there were 230 wounded in the protests, and 205 arrests. Four people had been killed—all were shot. The TSJ issued an arrest warrant for López on 2 May, who exited the gates of the Spanish Embassy, with his wife Lilian Tintori, to speak with reporters, saying that Maduro's days are numbered. Maduro appeared at an army base to praise the loyalty of the forces.

More protests and rallies were held during May; Guaidó acknowledged that he had "overestimated military support". During an interview with The Washington Post, he stated that he would consider a U.S. military intervention should the time arise.

On 11 May, Guaidó organized another march in Caracas, with a turnout of around a thousand Venezuelans. During the rally, Guaidó asked his ambassador appointed to the United States, Carlos Vecchio, to start a dialog with the US Southern Command.

=== Simonovis release ===
Iván Simonovis—a former police commissioner arrested in November 2004 and accused by the Hugo Chávez government of the violence occurring in Caracas during the April 2002 Llaguno Overpass events—left house arrest on 17 May. Guaidó said that security forces loyal to him released Simonovis. Guaidó claims that the order was sent on 30 April and that Simonovis was pardoned and freed as part of Operation Freedom. One month later, Simonovis arrived in the United States.

=== Reception ===
In a May poll by Datanálisis, 39% of respondents said the events of 30 April were beneficial for Guaidó, about 29% said the events strengthened Maduro, and the rest were undecided. Half of respondents viewed Guaidó's actions as legitimate. One in three considered the event a coup d'état. 49% judged the release of Leopoldo López as positive, while about 16% judged it as negative.

By the end of 2019, The Washington Post considered the event as one of the greatest failures of Guaidó's movement. According to the newspaper, officials in the United States and the Venezuelan opposition have referred to the event as "Venezuela's Bay of Pigs".

Some academics and media outlets would ultimately describe the event as a coup d'état. The Nation would write, "Foreign outlets, dutifully supporting Trump administration calls for regime change, reported that a widespread uprising was underway, even though Juan Guaidó’s coup attempt had little support".

== Response ==
=== Governments ===
==== In support of Guaidó ====
- Argentina − President Mauricio Macri called on the military to carry on with "Operation Freedom" and said that the time for Venezuelans has come. He added that the suffering of the Venezuelan people will soon "come to an end and called Venezuelans to be fearless". Argentine Foreign Ministry expressed that the "spirit of freedom that animates Venezuelans at this hour have the support of the Argentine people in recognition of Interim President Juan Guaidó, in order to restore again democracy in the brother Republic of Venezuela". Argentina issued a joint statement with the Lima Group sharing support for Guaidó and calling for Maduro's exit. Argentine President Mauricio Macri addressed the nation and rejected the accusation of coup but expressed that his wishes that military be "triunfant against dictator Maduro".
- Australia − Foreign Minister Marise Payne stated "Australia continues to call for a peaceful and speedy transition to democracy in Venezuela. We condemn reports of violence and urge restraint. We support Juan Guaidó as interim President in accordance with Venezuela’s constitution and until elections are held."
- Brazil – President Jair Bolsonaro tweeted that Brazil is following the situation in Venezuela very closely, that it reaffirms its support for the "democratic transition," and that "Brazil is on the side of the Venezuelan people, of president Juan Guaidó and of the freedom of Venezuelans.
- Canada – Foreign Minister Chrystia Freeland tweeted that "The safety and security of [Juan Guaidó] and [Leopoldo López] must be guaranteed. Venezuelans who peacefully support Interim President Guaido must do so without fear of intimidation or violence." On 8 May, Freeland demanded Cuba to stop supporting Maduro and help to solve the crisis in a peaceful way.
- Czech Republic – Minister of Foreign Affairs Tomáš Petříček stated "I call on the Venezuelan army to listen to the citizens of the country and to support the peaceful democratic transition by the President and leader of the National Assembly Juan Guaidó".
- Chile – President Sebastián Piñera stated "I want to reiterate the solid and unbreakable support to the democratic president Juan Guaidó and to democracy".
- Colombia – President Iván Duque stated "We call the military and the people of Venezuela to be on the right side of history, rejecting the dictatorship and usurpation of Maduro".
- Costa Rica – in a Lima Group joint statement, the nation shared support for Guaidó and called for Maduro's exit.
- Ecuador – Foreign Minister of Ecuador José Valencia stated "The Government of Ecuador renews its strong support to President Juan Guaidó in the difficult times that Venezuela is going through. We wish for a peaceful transition without bloodshed. We will support all international efforts in that regard".
- Georgia – Prime Minister Mamuka Bakhtadze supported "the Venezuelan people's call for freedom", who are "fighting against the undemocratic leadership of Nicolas Maduro."
- Guatemala – in a Lima Group joint statement, the nation shared support for Guaidó and called for Maduro's exit.
- Honduras – in a Lima Group joint statement, the nation shared support for Guaidó and called for Maduro's exit.
- Panama – in a Lima Group joint statement, the nation shared support for Guaidó and called for Maduro's exit.
- Peru – in a Lima Group joint statement, the nation shared support for Guaidó and called for Maduro's exit.
- Paraguay – President Mario Abdo Benítez stated "Brave people of Venezuela! Your time has come!"
- Spain – Isabel Celaá, in her capacity as the Spokesperson of the Government of Spain, stated "We hope with all of our strength that there is no bloodshed. We support a peaceful democratic process in Venezuela" and that Guaidó holds "legitimacy to lead democratic transition in Venezuela".
- United States – Mike Pompeo, U.S. Secretary of State, tweeted "The U.S. Government fully supports the Venezuelan people in their quest for freedom and democracy."

==== In support of Maduro ====
- Belarus – Ministry of Foreign Affairs of Belarus condemned an "unconstitutional attempt of seizure of power" and stated that Venezuelan problems must be solved in a peaceful and lawful manner.
- Bolivia – President Evo Morales condemned "the coup attempt in Venezuela" and shared support for Maduro.
- Cuba – President Miguel Díaz-Canel stated "We reject this coup movement that tries to fill the country with violence. The traitors that have placed themselves at the head of this subversive movement have employed troops and police with weapons of war in a public street in the city to create anguish and terror".
- El Salvador – President Salvador Sánchez Cerén and the ruling Farabundo Martí National Liberation Front (FMLN) rejected the "coup attempt" against the legitimate government of the Venezuela. President Sanchez Ceren called on all parties for a dialogue while calling for the international community to find a peaceful exit on the ongoing crisis.
- Iran – Foreign Minister Mohammad Javad Zarif stated "We are happy that the people of Venezuela defeated the coup. We continue to believe in the need for discussions among the people, as the Government has suggested".
- North Korea - The Ministry of Foreign Affairs of North Korea (as quoted by KCNA) expressed its support for Nicolás Maduro and denounced an "attempted coup d'état" which it considers "a dangerous act of violence".
- Palestine – Ministry of Foreign Affairs issued a statement in which it condemned "the coup attempt against the Constitution and the legitimate leadership elected in the Bolivarian Republic of Venezuela."
- Russia – Russia's Ministry of Foreign Affairs called on the opposition to renounce violence. The media statement read "It is important to avoid unrest and bloodshed. The problems facing Venezuela should be resolved through a responsible negotiation process without preconditions.”
- Syria – The Syrian Foreign Ministry "strongly condemns the failed coup d'état against constitutional legitimacy."
- Turkey – President Recep Tayyip Erdoğan condemned the actions of Guaidó, tweeting "Those who are in an effort to appoint a postmodern colonial governor to Venezuela, where the President was appointed by elections and where the people rule, should know that only democratic elections can determine how a country is governed".

==== Neutral statements ====
- Mexico – The Foreign Relations Department reiterated their goal of "finding a common path." President Andrés Manuel López Obrador expressed in a conference that he "believes in nonintervention and dialogue."
- Uruguay – Former President José Mujica said that one "should not place oneself in front of the tanks", referring to the armored VN-4s that ran over protestors.

=== Intergovernmental bodies ===
- ALBA-TCP – The member states of ALBA rejected "attempts to violate the constitutional order in the Venezuela."
- European Parliament – President of the European Parliament Antonio Tajani stated "Today, 30 April, marks a historic moment for the return to democracy and freedom in Venezuela, which the European Parliament has always supported".
- Lima Group – In a joint statement, the group supports "the constitutional and popular process undertaken by the Venezuelan people, under the leadership of the President in Charge, Juan Guaidó, to recover democracy in Venezuela; and they reject that this process is qualified as a coup d'état", demand that the military "show their loyalty" to Guaidó and called for Maduro "to cease the usurpation, so that the democratic transition, the constitutional normalization and the economic and social reconstruction of Venezuela can begin."
- Organization of American States – Secretary General Luis Almagro called for the "definitive cessation of the usurpation"; Almagro tweeted: "We welcome the adhesion of the military to the Constitution and to the President in charge of Venezuela. We need the fullest support for the democratic transition process in a peaceful manner."

== See also ==
- Attack on Fort Paramacay
- El Junquito raid
- Censorship and media control during the Venezuelan presidential crisis
- El Porteñazo
- El Carupanazo
- Macuto Bay raid
