= Raúl Gorrín =

Venezuelan businessman and wanted fugitive

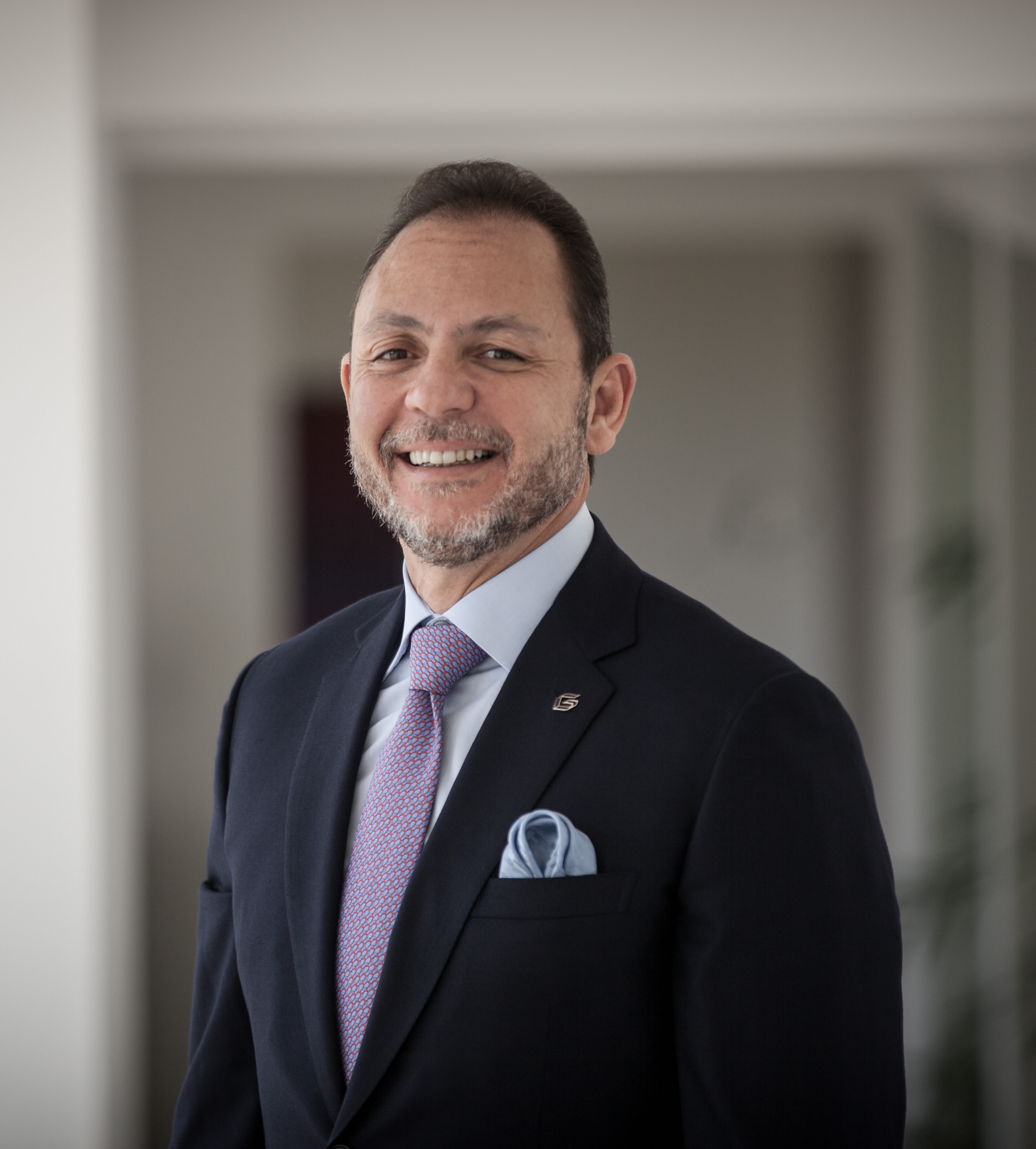
- Gorrín in 2018
- Born: November 22, 1968 (age 57); Caracas, Venezuela
- Education: Universidad Santa María
- Occupation: businessman
- Years active: 2013–present
- Known for: President of Globovisión
- Awards: Iberoamerican Personality of the Year
- Website: raulgorrin.net

Raúl Gorrín Belisario (born 22 November 1968) is a fugitive Venezuelan lawyer and businessman who currently serves as president of Globovisión and La Vitalicia insurance company. Due to his close relationship with the Venezuelan government, he is currently subjected to US sanctions over a corruption scheme involving bribery payments to Chávez-era government ministers. In November 2019, U.S. Immigration and Customs Enforcement (ICE) added Raúl Gorrín to the ICE Most Wanted List accused of money laundering. He was detained in 2026 in a joint operation between the United States and Venezuela during the United States intervention in Venezuela.

== Education and career ==
Gorrín studied law at the Universidad Santa María, venturing into his profession from young age through the foundation of the RGDPJ Law Office. In 2008, along with ten other shareholders, he bought the insurance company La Vitalicia, today located among the first 40 Venezuelan insurers in accordance with the Venezuelan–American chamber Venancham.

== Purchase of Globovisión ==
After the death of President Hugo Chávez, and the presidential elections that led Nicolás Maduro to the presidency of Venezuela in 2013, Gorrín carried out the acquisition of the Globovisión news channel, which he negotiated a year earlier. Following the sale, Globovisión's managerial staff stated that the editorial line would be changed and would be forced to move to the "centre". Since then, Globovisión has been singled out by the Venezuelan opposition to "self-censor."

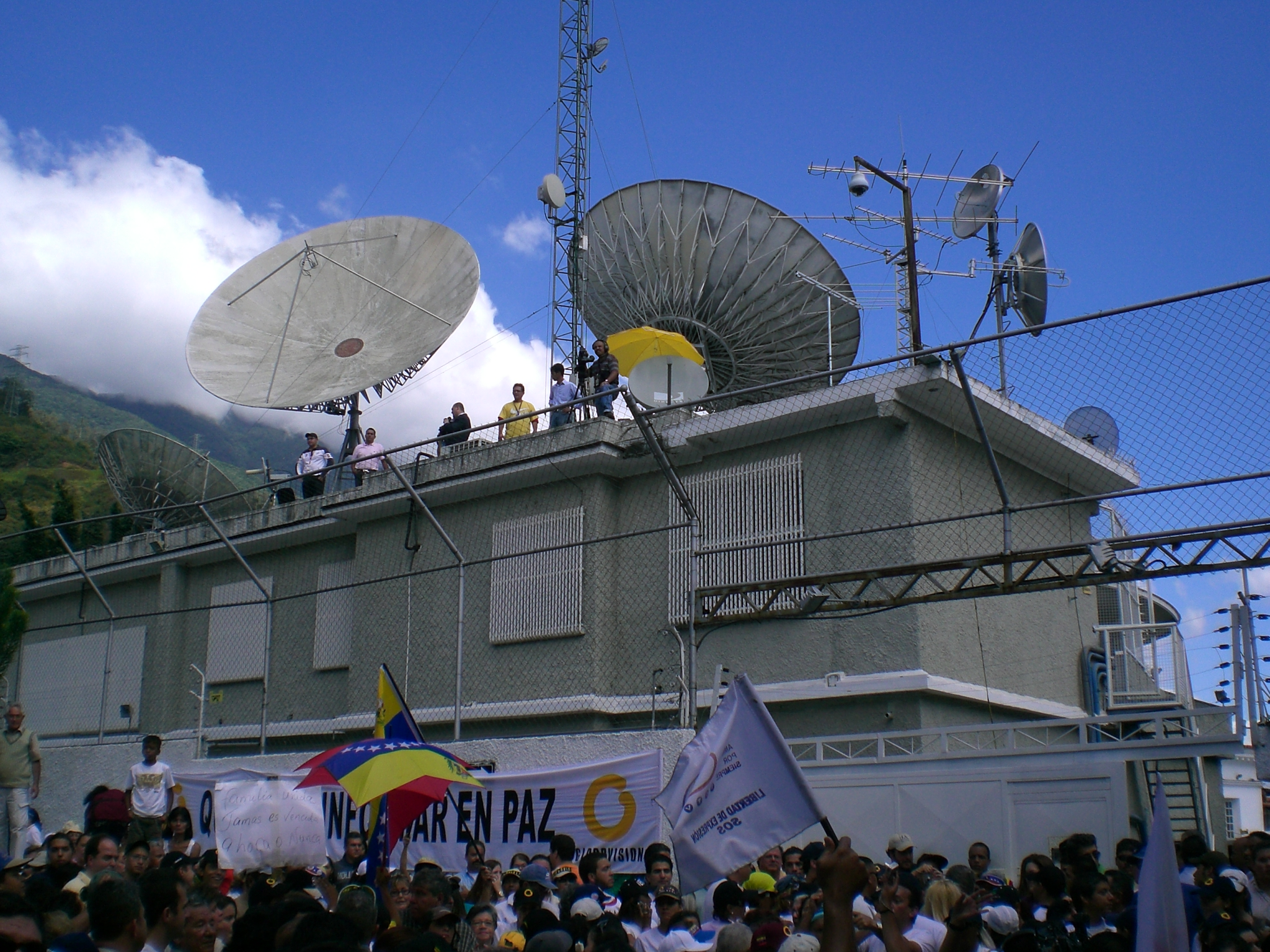
Globovisión studios, Caracas

On 11 March 2013, Carlos Zuloaga, vice president of the channel and son of Guillermo Zuloaga, announced that negotiations were being held with entrepreneur Juan Domingo Cordero for the sale of 80% of the channel's shareholding. Later, Guillermo Zuloaga directed a letter to the employees of the channel confirming the intention to sell and explaining that the channel was economically, politically and legally unviable.

=== Resignation of Globovisión anchors ===
On 24 May 2013, former presidential candidate Henrique Capriles said that the new Globovisión board had ordered that his speeches not be broadcast live. This after one of his speeches was censored in the Good Night program and skipped several parts of his speeches in news reports, this being the beginning and cause of the resignation of journalists and presenters such as Kiko Bautista, Carla Angola, Roland Carreño and Pedro Luis Flores.

Also the resignation of Leopoldo Castillo de Globovisión to his program Aló Ciudadano, provoked the resignation in solidarity by Gladys Rodríguez, Román Lozinski, Nitu Pérez Osuna and several correspondents in the interior of Venezuela, as a consequence of the change in the editorial line of the channel. On 16 August 2013, entrepreneur and shareholder Juan Domingo Cordero irrevocably abandoned the position of president of Globovisión, after discovering that the suspension of the "Aló Ciudadano" program, led by Leopoldo Castillo, was approved "without his knowledge and approval".

On 2 April 2014, the journalist and anchor of the Globovisión night, Reimy Chávez, who resigned that night in live broadcast, clarified via Twitter how he was leaving the television plant. Reimy said that a large deployment of security accompanied him to the exit, but that he was not attacked at any time, asking respect to the rest of his companions who decided to stay in the channel.

=== Broadcasting with Venezuelan state TV ===
In August 2014, the channel joins for the first time in the broadcasts of certain political parties. the Venezuelan League of Professional Baseball (LVBP), this being the fourth channel in the broadcast of the seasons, the TVes channel also joins the same channel this year.

The new owners of Globovisión, Gustavo Perdomo and Raúl Gorrín, and the former president of the channel, Juan Domingo Cordero, were declared persona non grata by the government of Miami on 22 May 2014.

== Controversies ==
=== Corruption allegations ===
On August 18, 2018, the United States Department of Justice accused Gorrin for the following charges:

- Conspiracy to violate the law against acts of corruption.
- Conspiracy to commit money laundering.
- Money laundering through monetary instruments.

The accusation indicates that Gorrín paid more than US$1 billion in bribes to two high officials of the Venezuelan government Gabriel Jiménez and Alejando Andrade, ex-treasurers under the government of Hugo Chávez. The latter have signed a plea agreement with the United States Department of Justice. In the plea agreement, Andrade admitted that he received more than a billion dollars from Gorrín and other conspirators in exchange for using his position as Minister of the Treasury of Venezuela.

Likewise, Andrade agreed to deliver a billion dollars and all the assets obtained through the acts of corruption that are accused, including property, vehicles, horses, watches, airplanes and bank accounts. Gabriel Jiménez admitted to being part of the conspiracy along with Gorrín and others, to acquire the Dominican bank Peravia through which the money from the bribes and their commissions were washed.

On 27 November 2018, Andrade was sentenced by the United States District Court for the Southern District of Florida to 10 years in prison for accepting over $1 billion in bribes for his role in the scheme.

=== Sanctions ===
On 8 January 2019, the Office of Foreign Assets Control (OFAC) of the United States Department of the Treasury imposed sanctions against Gorrín and six other Venezuelans, accusing them of being part of "a significant plot of corruption" through the use of the foreign currency exchange system. Following the announcement, Globovisión and 23 other companies were added to the Specially Designated Nationals list of OFAC. All the assets subject to the jurisdiction of the United States are frozen and American citizens are prohibited from conducting economic transactions with them.

The Treasury Department allowed U.S. persons to make certain transactions related to winding down or maintaining business with the television broadcaster in Coral Gables, Florida, and Caracas, Venezuela with a expiry date set for 8 January 2020.

=== Role in the bid to oust Maduro ===
During 2019, a presidential crisis concerning who is the legitimate head of state of Venezuela has been underway since 10 January 2019, with the nation and the world divided in support for Nicolás Maduro (de facto presidency) or the head of the National Assembly Juan Guaidó (as acting president). The Venezuelan investigative journal Armando.Info reported that Raúl Gorrín was involved in a plot to oust Maduro, that eventually lead to Guaido's call for a military uprising on 30 April 2019. According to an article of The Wall Street Journal, co-authored by Juan Forero, Gorrín met with important members of Maduro's administration to back Juan Guaidó. In exchange, the US would lift the sanctions on Gorrín and the defecting officials. Gorrín was chosen for his close ties to Supreme Tribunal of Justice chief Maikel Moreno, defense minister Vladimir Padrino López, and counter-intelligence chief Iván Hernández. The plot consisted in convincing the Supreme Tribunal of Justice to issue a decree to support Juan Guaidó legitimacy. During the 30 April, opposition leader Leopoldo López was released from house arrest and small group of military and police joined Guaidó, including Manuel Cristopher Figuera, the chief of the Bolivarian Intelligence Service. Nevertheless, the main goals of the uprising were not achieved and the resulting clashes that continued for various days left 5 protesters dead.

During interview of The Washington Post with Christopher Figuera, who fled to the United States, he confirmed to have worked with Raúl Gorrín. According to Christopher Figuera, Gorrín was the one that approached the US authorities with the plan to make the Supreme Court change sides, so Gorrín could have the sanctions on him lifted.

=== ICE most wanted ===
In November 2019, U.S. Immigration and Customs Enforcement (ICE) added Raúl Gorrín to the ICE Most Wanted List accused of money laundering.
