= Juan Mejía =

Juan Mejía may refer to:

- Juan Mejía (baseball) (born 2000), Dominican professional baseball player
- Juan Mejía González (born 1975), Mexican drug lord
- Juan Andrés Mejía (born 1986), Venezuelan politician
