= Richard Blanco (disambiguation) =

Richard Blanco may refer to:

- Richard Blanco (politician) (born 1964), Venezuelan politician
- Richard Blanco (born 1968), American poet
- Richard Blanco (footballer) (born 1982), Venezuelan footballer
