= Alcatrazlistan =

Swedish most wanted list

The Alcatrazlistan (English: Alcatraz List) is a most wanted list of 100 figures in organized crime maintained by the Swedish law enforcement agencies. It takes its name from the notorious prison in San Francisco.

The Alcatrazlistan is maintained by a council of representatives from law enforcement agencies, including the Swedish National Police (Rikskriminalpolisen), the Swedish Security Service, Swedish Tax Agency, Swedish Prosecution Authority, Swedish Customs Service and the Swedish Economic Crime Authority.

The list targets criminals wanted for mafia and organized crime, and includes both Swedes and foreign nationals. Although the list is highly classified, copies of the list are reportedly sold among criminals, who authorities fear may use it to find information on criminal rivals and their associates.

Local law enforcement agencies began referring to area criminal suspects as the "lokala Alcatrazlisten" ("local Alcatraz list") after a rise in crime in 2013.

A similar list, the Novalist, includes the top 100 wanted people in organized crime in Stockholm.

== Notable people reportedly on the list ==
- Thomas Möller, former president of the Hell's Angels in Sweden

== See also ==
- Fiche S
- FBI Ten Most Wanted Fugitives
- Swedish National Council for Crime Prevention
