= ICE Most Wanted =

US Immigration and Customs Enforcement most wanted list

Logo of the U.S. Immigration and Customs Enforcement

The ICE Most Wanted is a most wanted list maintained by the United States Immigration and Customs Enforcement (ICE). Shortly after the formation of ICE, the list was originally unveiled as the ICE Most Wanted Criminal Aliens on May 14, 2003. The list includes individuals accused of serious transnational crime and being a threat to public safety.

== Categories ==
The list includes the "most wanted" of four units of the Immigration and Customs Enforcement:

- Homeland Security Investigations – Those wanted for conducting criminal acts that threaten the national security of the United States
- Enforcement and Removal – Those wanted for serious criminal offenses who are destined to be removed from the United States
- Human Trafficking – Those wanted for being involved in severe acts of human trafficking
- VOICE Office – Those wanted for committing crimes against the public in the United States who had an existing status to be removed

== List (as of October 2026) ==
Photo	Name	Wanted for	Category
	Yulan Adonay Archaga Carias	Racketeering conspiracy, cocaine importation conspiracy, possession and conspiracy to possess machine guns.	Homeland Security Investigations
	Julian Bocanegra-Lupian	Illegal re-entry after removal and immigration violations	Enforcement and removal
	Jose Calix-Lopez	Open and gross lewdness	Enforcement and removal, VOICE
	Fredy Gonzalez-Gamboa	Aggravated domestic violence; firearm possession	VOICE
	Jose Martin Gonzalez-Lopez	Rape	VOICE
	Raúl Gorrín Belisario	Money laundering, corruption	Homeland Security Investigations
	Jose Isidro Gutierrez-Marez	Human trafficking	Homeland Security Investigations
	Iván Archivaldo Guzmán Salazar	Crimes against the United States	Homeland Security Investigations
	Jesús Alfredo Guzmán Salazar	Crimes against the United States	Homeland Security Investigations
	Aureliano Guzmán Loera	Crimes against the United States	Homeland Security Investigations
	Esteban Hernandez	Grand theft, assault with a deadly weapon, burglary, possession of a firearm	Enforcement and removal
	Esteban Juarez-Tomas	Aggravated DUI	Homeland Security Investigations, VOICE
	Jesus Maltos-Chacon	Vehicular manslaughter	VOICE
	Alan Jacob Mogollon-Anaya	Vehicular homicide	VOICE
	Santos Moreira	Manslaughter	Enforcement and removal
	Mateo Ontiveros-Valencia	Luring minor/person with developmental disability	Enforcement and removal
	Nanya Orozco-Herrarte	Aggravated assault with deadly weapon	VOICE
	Gorje Patricio Palahuachi-Mayansela	Illegal re-entry after removal	Enforcement and removal
	Alexis Rodriguez-Guevarra	Felony conviction for misconduct involving weapons	Enforcement and removal
	Luis Rodriguez-Jacobo	Voluntary manslaughter	Enforcement and removal
	Heriberto Salgueiro-Nevarez	Crimes against the United States	Homeland Security Investigations
	Jose Salgueiro-Nevarez	Crimes against the United States	Homeland Security Investigations
	Ruperto Salgueiro-Nevarez	Crimes against the United States	Homeland Security Investigations
	Pablo Solis-Figueroa	Assault and robbery	Enforcement and removal
	Julio Valencia-Valencia	Burglary of habitation, resisting officer, forgery and illegal re-entry	Enforcement and removal
	Omar Guillermo Cuen-Lugo	Conspiracy to distribute Cocaine and Conspiracy to Launder Money	Homeland Security Investigations
	Jose Orlando Gonzalez-Medina	Aggravated homicide	Homeland Security Investigations
	Antonio Feliciano Guaman-Paredes	Aggravated homicide	Homeland Security Investigations
	Ingrid Estela Hernandez	Gang membership	Homeland Security Investigations
	Jose Raul Iraheta	Aggravated homicide	Homeland Security Investigations
	Delfino Jimenez-Calderon	Sex Trafficking, Trafficking for Forced Labor, Peonage and Slavery, Document Servitude, and Interstate Transportation of Minors for Commercial Sex	Homeland Security Investigations
	Luis Jimenez-Calderon	Sex Trafficking, Trafficking for Forced Labor, Peonage and Slavery, Document Servitude, and Interstate Transportation of Minors for Commercial Sex	Homeland Security Investigations
	Ricardo Vega	Possession and Distribution of Child Pornography, Sex Offenses against Children, Solicitation of minor females to produce child exploitation material, production of child pornography, sextortion	Homeland Security Investigations
	Zhi Dong Zhang	Money Laundering, Conspiracy to Import a controlled substance, Possession with intent to distribute a controlled substance	Homeland Security Investigations

Photo	Name	Wanted for	Category	Status
	Ramirez Camacho	Money laundering	Homeland Security Investigations	Arrested by Venezuelan law enforcement
	Tareck El Aissami	Narcotics	Homeland Security Investigations	Arrested by Venezuelan law enforcement in 2023, but still wanted by ICE
	Joaquín Guzmán López	Drug trafficking	Homeland Security Investigations	Self surrendered
	Samark Jose Lopez-Bello	Sanctions evasion	Homeland Security Investigations	Arrested by Venezuelan law enforcement
	Severiano Martinez-Rojas	Sex trafficking	Human trafficking	Captured
	Saul Romero-Rugerio	Sex trafficking	Human trafficking	Captured by Mexican federal police
	Jesus Guillermo Alvarado-Serrano	Gang membership	Homeland Security Investigations	Captured
	Juan Francisco Melendez-Navarro	Battery family violence; child cruelty	VOICE	Captured
	Ismael Ortega-Hernandez	Suspected murder	Enforcement and removal, VOICE	Captured

== See also ==
- FBI Ten Most Wanted Fugitives
