= Most wanted list =

List of criminals

A most wanted list is a list of criminals and alleged criminals who are believed to be at large and are identified as a law enforcement agency's highest priority for capture. The list can alert the public to be watchful, and generates publicity for the agency.

== History ==
The Federal Bureau of Investigation (FBI) was the first agency to create a most wanted list. The FBI Ten Most Wanted Fugitives list was inaugurated on March 14, 1950, at the direction of FBI director J. Edgar Hoover. The idea for the list came from a question asked by a reporter for the International News Service. The reporter asked the FBI to provide names and descriptions of the "toughest guys" that the agency wanted to capture. After observing the high level of public interest generated by the resulting news story, Hoover decided to publish a formal list.

== Context ==
=== Collective ===
In the years following the creation of the American initial lists, other law enforcement agencies around the world, representing all jurisdictional levels, have issued their own lists of most wanted fugitives.

Although lists often contain lone suspects, they sometimes contain individuals who form part of a larger network. Sometimes this can constitute a closely knit network as a gang, but can also constitute a loose-connected or a person within an umbrella agglomeration whose association to one another is negligible and may even have an international scope.

In such collective scenarios, there is a common assumption that making it onto a fugitive-like list necessitates rendering such an individual as a leading figure within one's field of turpitude. However ofttimes such an individual's upturn in notability may largely stem from notoriety caused by mainstream media sensationalism or in international situations, due to a shared nationality between the suspect and the jurisdiction of the law enforcement agency.

List members generally are not ranked by priority. Historically, a higher proportion of suspected persons on such lists were often listed in accordance with deeds pertaining to betrayal, such as double agents, or purveyors of treason.

=== Individuals ===
There is no official worldwide list of most wanted fugitives. Interpol publishes a list of "red notices" identifying and describing fugitive persons who are wanted by a national jurisdiction and are being sought internationally for capture and extradition. This is, however, an inclusive list rather than a "most wanted" list. In 2008, Forbes magazine published an informal list of the World's 10 Most Wanted Fugitives, assembled after consulting with law enforcement agencies around the world. Candidates for the Forbes list were fugitives thought to be dangerous who had "a long history of committing serious crimes", who had been indicted or charged with a crime in a national jurisdiction or by an international tribunal, and who were involved with a type of criminal activity "with which legal institutions in diverse jurisdictions are grappling". The Forbes list has been updated and republished in subsequent years.

== Examples ==
- Alcatrazlistan, organized crime list in Sweden named after the San Francisco prison
- EU Most Wanted
- FBI Most Wanted Terrorists
- FBI Ten Most Wanted Fugitives
- ICE Most Wanted
- List of Mexico's 37 most-wanted drug lords
- List of most wanted fugitives in Italy
- NIA Most Wanted, most wanted in India
- Saudi list of most-wanted suspected terrorists
- U.S. list of most-wanted Iraqis
