= Juan Andrés Mejía =

Venezuelan politician (born 1986)

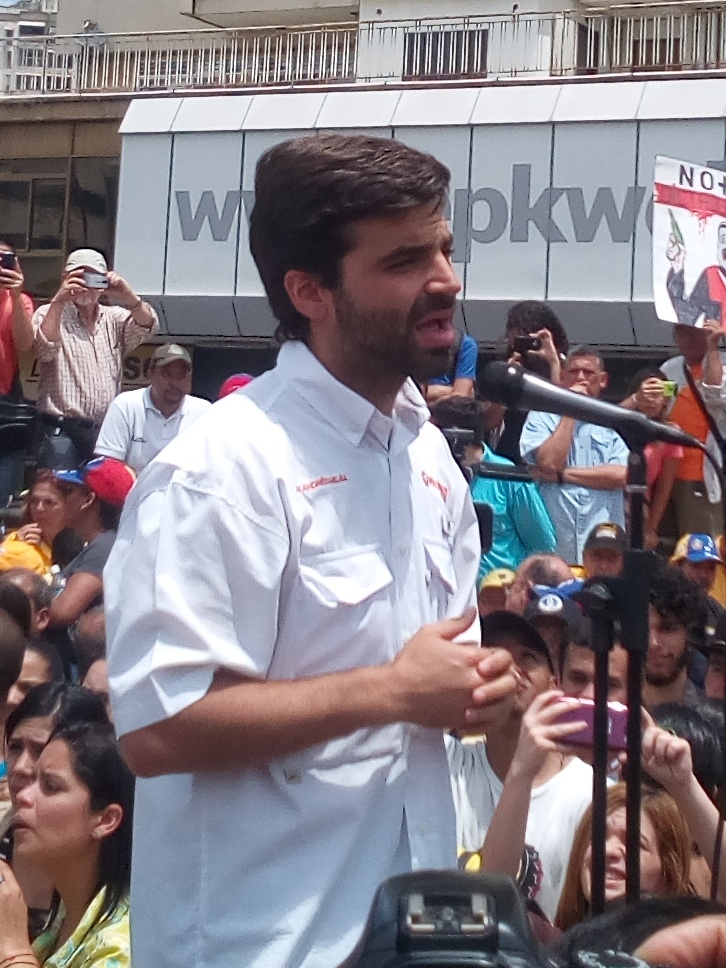
Juan Andrés Mejía in 2017

Juan Andrés Mejía Szilard (b. 30 May 1986) is a Venezuelan deputy to the National Assembly representing the state of Miranda. He is also the political coordinator for his party, Popular Will (Spanish: Voluntad Popular).

Mejía heads the National Assembly commission to develop and advance a plan for Venezuela's reconstruction, Plan País.

As a student, he was president of the Simón Bolívar University student union. As a candidate for the National Assembly, with Freddy Guevara, he emphasized the role of student protests against Venezuela's President, Nicolás Maduro.

In May 2019, Supreme Tribunal of Justice ordered the prosecution of several National Assembly members for their actions during the failed uprising, including Juan Andrés Mejía.

After finalizing his MPA at Harvard University, he works at the Andean Country Department at the Inter-American Development Bank since 2020.
