= VN4 =

Armoured personnel carrier

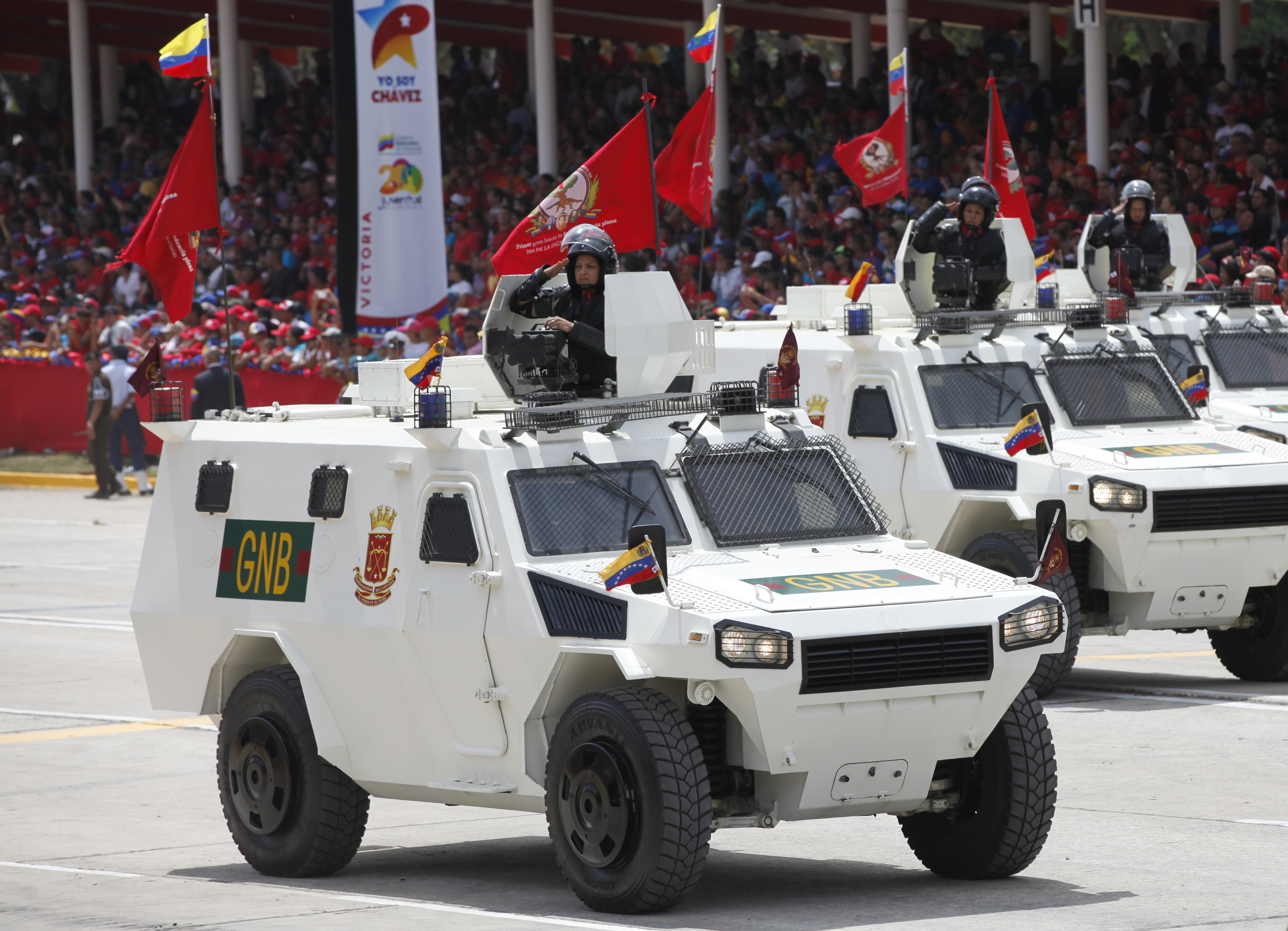
- VN4s in Caracas, Venezuela on 5 March 2014 during the commemoration of Hugo Chavez's death
- Type: Armoured Personnel Carrier
- Place of origin: China

Service history
- Used by: Operators

Production history
- Manufacturer: Chongqing Tiema Industries Corporation
- Produced: 2009–present

Specifications
- Mass: 9,000 kg (combat)
- Length: 5.4 m
- Width: 2.4 m
- Height: 2.05 m
- Crew: 2 drivers + 8 soldiers
- Main armament: 7.62 mm or 12.7 mm heavy machine gun
- Secondary armament: 3 smoke grenade dischargers
- Engine: 6 cylinder in-line, water cooled, turbocharged diesel engine
- Power/weight: 24.5
- Drive: 4 x 4
- Operational range: 700 km
- Maximum speed: 115 km/h

The VN4, nicknamed the "Rhinoceros", is a multi-role light armoured personnel carrier that can be used for police forces, armored troops, peacekeeping and anti-terrorism.

== Development ==
The VN4 was unveiled in 2009 and is produced in China by Chongqing Tiema Industries Corporation, a China North Industries Corporation (NORINCO) company.

== Description ==
The VN4 is a light armored vehicle that can be outfitted for certain scenarios. It is very mobile with a top speed of 115 km/h and has independent suspension for rough terrain. The armor is welded shut and primarily provides protection from small arms fire and splinters from explosives.

=== Features ===
- Air conditioning is provided to occupants from vents on the roof.
- Communication systems
- CTIS (central tyre inflation system)
- GPS
- Night vision driving capability
- Video Surveillance Systems

== Service history ==
=== Crisis in Bolivarian Venezuela ===
In the beginning of 2014, 191 VN4s existed in Venezuela. In 2014, during the 2014 Venezuelan protests, the Venezuelan government ordered 300 additional VN4 vehicles. The VN4 was heavily relied upon by the Bolivarian National Guard during the crisis in Bolivarian Venezuela against demonstrators who opposed the government of President Nicolas Maduro. As demonstrations strengthened during the 2017 Venezuelan protests, President Maduro hastily ordered an additional 165 VN4s from Norinco, paying fully for the equipment which arrived only weeks after the order, with the move being criticized since the low amount of funds allocated toward goods for Venezuelans had resulted in shortages in Venezuela during the preceding years.

== Operators ==
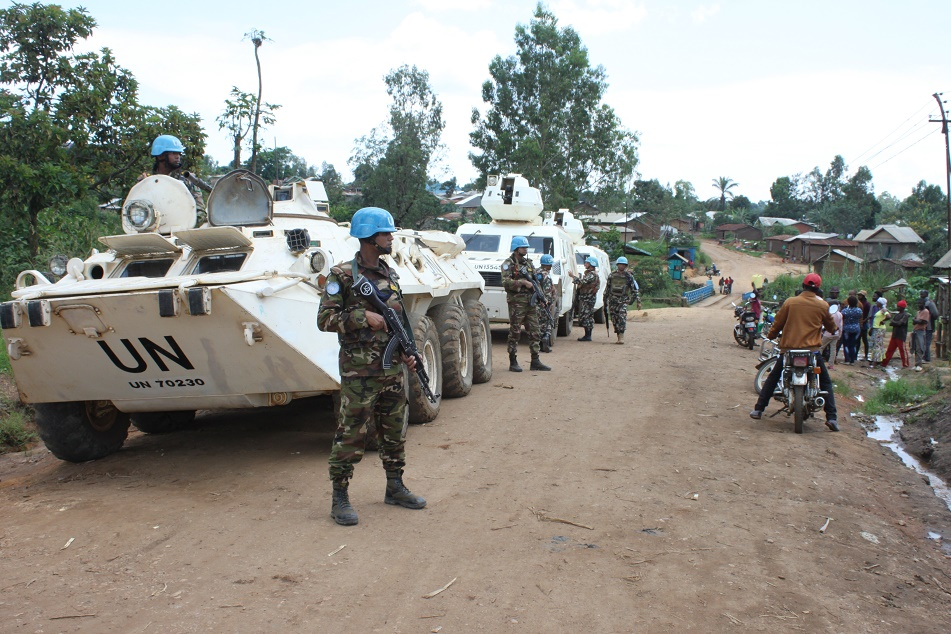
VN4 of the Nepalese contingent of MONUSCO, following a Bangladeshi BTR-80 (foreground).

- Venezuela:
  - Bolivarian National Guard
  - Bolivarian National Police
- Kenya: Kenya Police - GS Unit
- Nepal: Nepalese Army - 63, bought for peacekeeping missions
- Sudan: Sudanese Armed Forces
