= Manuel Cristopher Figuera =

Venezuelan soldier

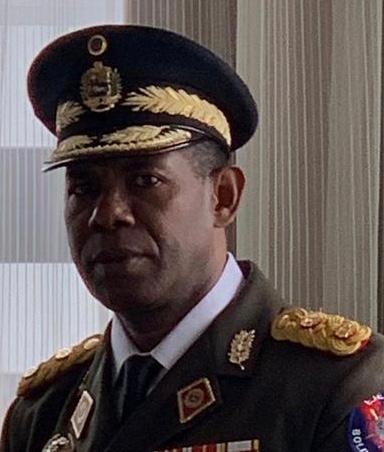

Director of SEBIN
- In office 30 October 2018 – 30 April 2019
- President: Nicolás Maduro
- Preceded by: Gustavo González López
- Succeeded by: Gustavo González López

Personal details
- Born: 8 November 1963 (age 62) Punta de Mata, Monagas, Venezuela
- Education: Military Academy of Venezuela; Universidad Nacional Experimental Simón Rodríguez

Military service
- Allegiance: Venezuela
- Branch: Venezuelan Army
- Rank: Major general

Manuel Ricardo Cristopher Figuera is the former director of the Bolivarian National Intelligence Service (SEBIN) and former major general of the Venezuelan army. He is known for being a main conspirator during the failed 2019 Venezuelan uprising.

== Early life ==
Christopher Figuera was born on 8 November 1963 in Punta de Mata, Monagas, Venezuela. He graduated from the Military Academy of Venezuela in 1989 with a military sciences and arts degree. He would later earn a master's degree in strategic management degree from the Universidad Nacional Experimental Simón Rodríguez in 2007, a master's in military sciences and arts and a doctorate in security of the nation from the Bolivarian Military University of Venezuela.

== Career ==
=== Chávez government ===
Under Chávez, Christopher Figuera served as an aide for over twelve years. He became the deputy director of the Directorate General of Military Intelligence in 2007.

=== Maduro government ===
In July 2017, he was appointed director of the Strategic Center for Security and Protection of the Fatherland (CESSPA) by President Nicolás Maduro. Following incidents that occurred under Gustavo González López's leadership while director of SEBIN, Christopher Figuera was named his replacement on 30 October 2018.

==== 2019 Venezuelan uprising attempt ====
During the 2019 Venezuelan uprising, Christopher Figuera was a main conspirator who attempted to persuade Maduro to resign his claim of Venezuela's presidency. Cristopher Figuera fled to the US after the events. In an interview with The Washington Post, he gave declarations on illicit gold deals by the Maduro administration, on Hezbollah cells in Venezuela and on the extent of Cuban influence in the military.

== Sanctions ==
Officials of Maduro's security and intelligence were sanctioned by the US (February 2019) and Canada (April 2019) for helping suppress democracy, the list included Cristopher Figuera. The US Treasury Department says the security officials are responsible for torture, human rights abuses, and extrajudicial killings.

Following the 30 April 2019 uprising, the governments of the US (May 2019) and Canada (June 2019) removed sanctions against Cristopher Figuera. The US Treasury Department press release said the action demonstrated that "removal of sanctions may be available for designated persons who take concrete and meaningful actions to restore democratic order, refuse to take part in human rights abuses, speak out against abuses committed by the illegitimate Maduro regime, or combat corruption in Venezuela".
