= Juan Forero =

American journalist

- Born: Bogotá, Colombia
- Education: Columbia University Graduate School of Journalism
- Occupation: South America bureau chief for The Wall Street Journal

Juan Forero is the South America bureau chief for The Wall Street Journal. He was previously The Washington Post's correspondent for Colombia and Venezuela and The New York Times' Bogotá bureau chief.

== Early life and education ==
Forero was born in Bogotá to Colombian parents. The family moved to the U.S. at age five, and he was raised there. He received a B.S. in History and Journalism from Marshall University. He studied at Columbia University's graduate school of journalism from 1987 to 1988 and received a Master's in Journalism.

== Career ==
From 1999 to 2006 he wrote for The New York Times, and was previously a staff writer at the Star-Ledger of Newark, N.J., Newsday, and the San Diego Union-Tribune. He has also covered other parts of Latin America.

He was a staff writer for the Washington Post, covering both human interest and political topics. Additionally, Forero has been a South America correspondent for NPR since 2006.

Upon announcing that Forero had been awarded a Maria Moors Cabot Prize for 2012, the School of Journalism at Columbia University called Forero's coverage of Latin America a "reliable constant for those seeking to keep up with news about this interesting and volatile part of the world," saying that "Forero's keen understanding of both [North and Latin American] cultures permeates his reporting for articles written for the Washington Post and his lively National Public Radio segments."

In January 2014, Forero became the South America bureau chief for The Wall Street Journal.
