= Richard Blanco (politician) =

Venezuelan politician (born 1964)

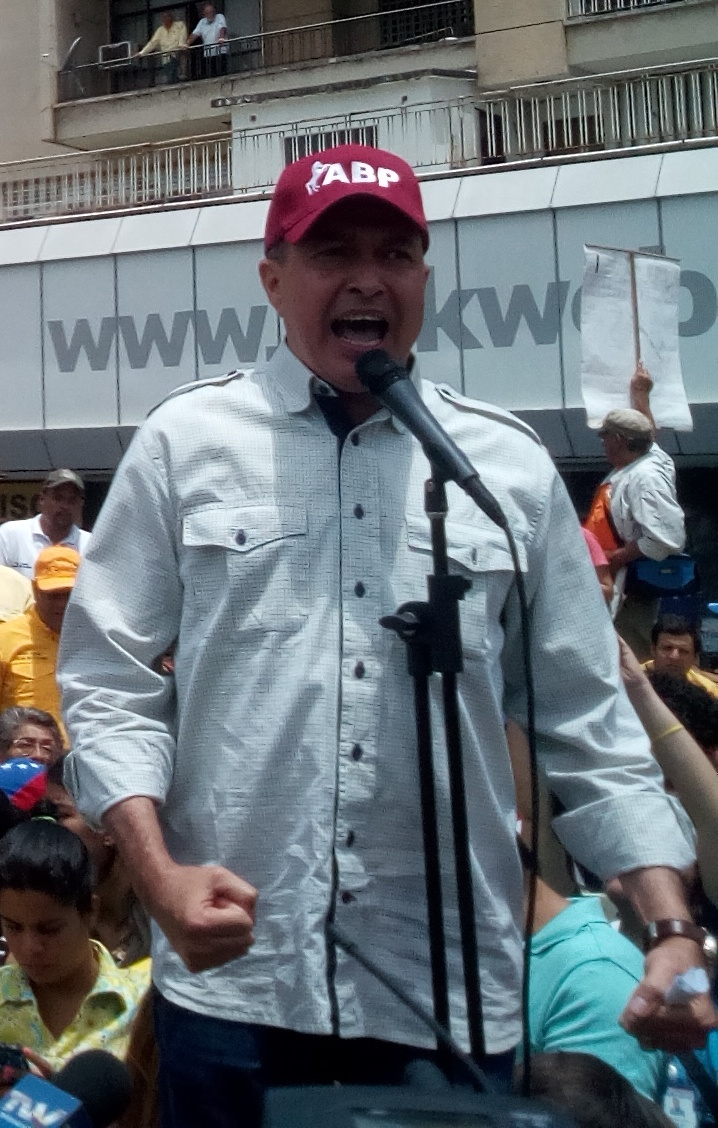
- Blanco during the 2017 Venezuelan protests

Deputy of the National Assembly for the Capital District
- In office 5 January 2011 – 5 January 2021

Personal details
- Born: 27 December 1964 (age 61) Caracas, Venezuela
- Party: Fearless People's Alliance
- Other political affiliations: Unitary Platform (Since 2021); Democratic Unity Roundtable (2008–2021)
- Education: Universidad Santa María

Richard Blanco (27 December 1964) is a Venezuelan politician who served as a deputy of the National Assembly from 2011 to 2021 and president of the Fearless People's Alliance party. He is a former political prisoner and a member of the Comando Con Venezuela

== Career ==
Richard Blanco graduated with a degree in social communication from Cecilio Acosta Catholic University and studied law at the Universidad Santa María. He has been the president of the Fearless People's Alliance party and a columnist for the newspaper El Nacional. He was general coordinator of the prefecture of the former governor's office of the Capital District in 1992, general director of municipal cemeteries between 1996 and 1999, director of citizen management of the mayor's office of Caracas between 1999 and 2001 and prefect of Caracas under the municipal administration of Antonio Ledezma between 2008 and 2009.

Richard was arrested in Caracas in August 2009 on charges of inciting violence and injuring a police officer during a demonstration. Amnesty International stated that "his detention appeared to be politically motivated", stating that the video evidence offered to prove his charges did not show any evidence of violence or incitement by Blanco. The organization called for his release. He was released on bail in April 2010. He was a member of the National Assembly for the 2011–2016 term. He was afterwards re-elected for the 2016–2021 term. He was president of the Permanent Commission of Cults and Penitentiary Regime of the National Assembly of Venezuela in 2016 and 2017.

In 2018 he was appointed head of fraction of the Soy Venezuela alliance in the National Assembly (16 de Julio faction) until 2019, when he is succeeded by National Convergence militant, Biagio Pilieri.

== See also ==
- III National Assembly of Venezuela
- IV National Assembly of Venezuela
- Political prisoners in Venezuela
