= Oficina Nacional Antidrogas =

Venezuelan law enforcement agency

National Anti-Drug Office
- Oficina Nacional Antidrogas; ONA

Agency overview
- Formed: January 23, 2006
- Jurisdiction: Venezuela
- Headquarters: Caracas, Venezuela
- Minister responsible: Vice-President of Venezuela
- Agency executive: Ramón Castillo García, Brigade General
- Parent agency: Ministry of Popular Power for Interior, Justice and Peace
- Child agency: National Anti-Drugs Fund (FONA)
- Website: www.ona.gob.ve

The National Anti-Drug Office or ONA (Spanish: Oficina Nacional Antidrogas) is a Venezuelan law enforcement agency of executive authority responsible for drafting state policy, legal regulation, control and monitoring in combating trafficking drugs, psychotropic substances, and their precursors. The ONA is specially authorized to address and solve problems relating to traffic in narcotic drugs, psychotropic substances, and their precursors.

Froom an organizational point of view, the O.N.A. is a decentralized body with functional autonomy, administrative and financial, established by Decree No. 4220, from January 23, 2006. the National Drugs Fund (FONA) is external service under the Office of National Drug Control (ONA), established by Decree No. 6778, from June 26, 2009.

== See also ==
- Crime in Venezuela
- Law enforcement in Venezuela
- Illegal drug trade in Venezuela
- DEA, U.S. counterpart
- FSKN, Russian counterpart
