= Crime in Venezuela =

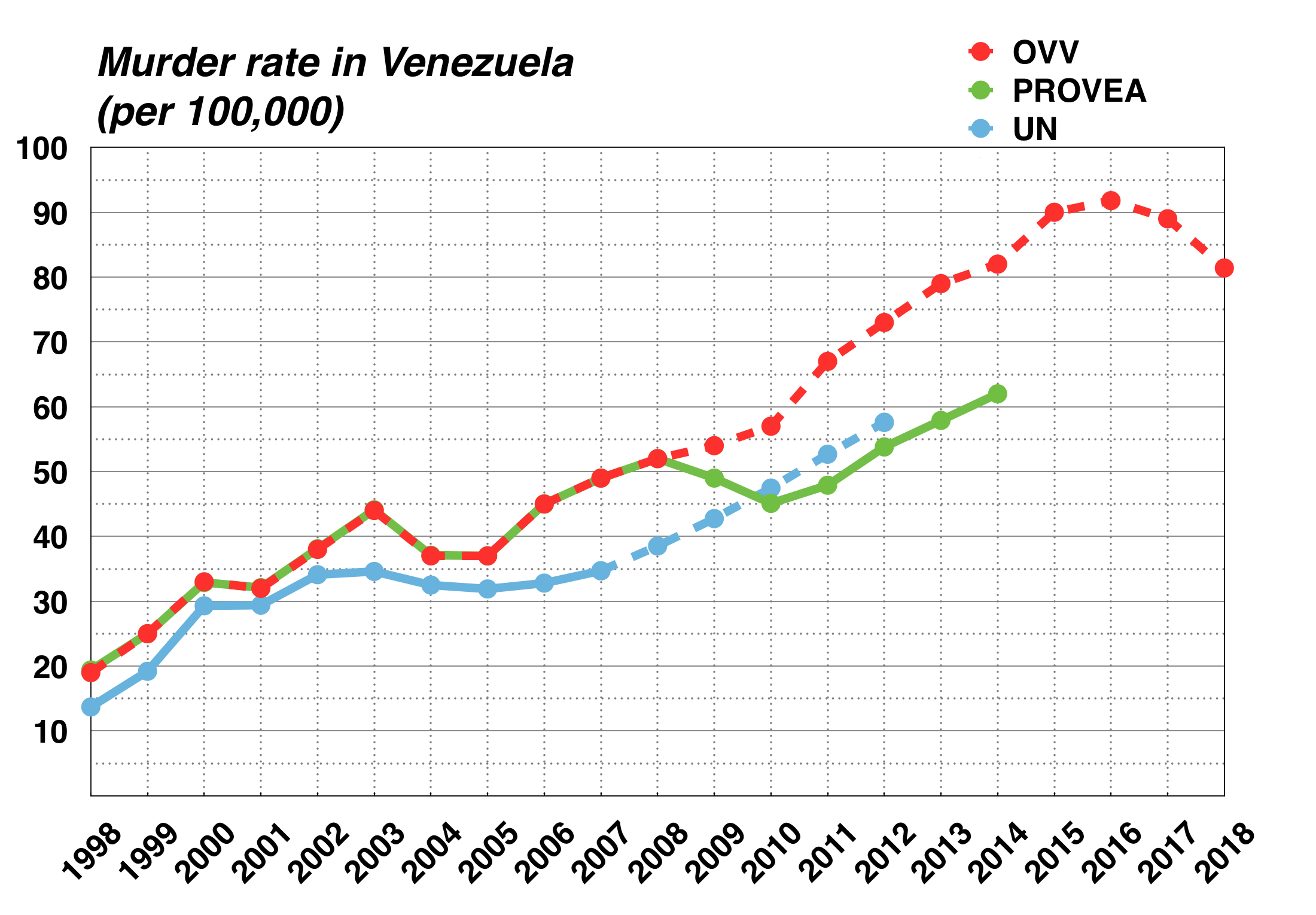
Murder rate in Venezuela (1998–2018)

Crime in Venezuela is widespread. In the early 2000s, violent crime—such as murder, kidnapping, and robbery—began to surge as a consequence of the 2002–2003 Venezuelan general strike against President Hugo Chávez, which was caused by the institutional instability of his Bolivarian government, underfunding of police resources, and extreme inequality. From then on, homicide rates began climbing dramatically each year. By 2008 Venezuela became among the most violent countries in the world. In 2014 the United Nations attributed crime to the poor political and economic environment in the country—which, at the time, had the second highest murder rate in the world. Chávez's government sought a cultural hegemony by promoting class conflict and social fragmentation, which in turn encouraged "criminal gangs to kill, kidnap, rob and extort", according to Maria C. Werlau, a Cuban-born anti-Castro activist and founder and executive director of the think tank Free Society Project. Upon Chávez's death in 2013, Venezuela was ranked the most insecure nation in the world by Gallup.

Crime has also continued to increase under Chávez's successor, President Nicolás Maduro, who continued Chávez's policies that disrupted Venezuela's socioeconomic status. By 2015, crime, which was often the topic Venezuelans worried about the most according to polls, was the second largest concern compared to shortages in Venezuela. Crimes related to shortages and hunger increased shortly after with growing incidents of looting occurring throughout the country. Most crime in Venezuela remains unpunished according to Venezuela's Prosecutor General's Office, as 98% of crimes in Venezuela do not result in prosecution.

In spite of significant socioeconomic problems, the murder rate in Venezuela decreased between 2017 and 2020. Venezuela's murder rate decreased from 92 per 100,000 in 2016 to 81.4 in 2018, according to the Venezuelan Violence Observatory (OVV), due in part to criminals joining millions of other Venezuelans in fleeing the country. The murder rate declined even further to 60.3 in 2019.

== Homicide and violent crime ==
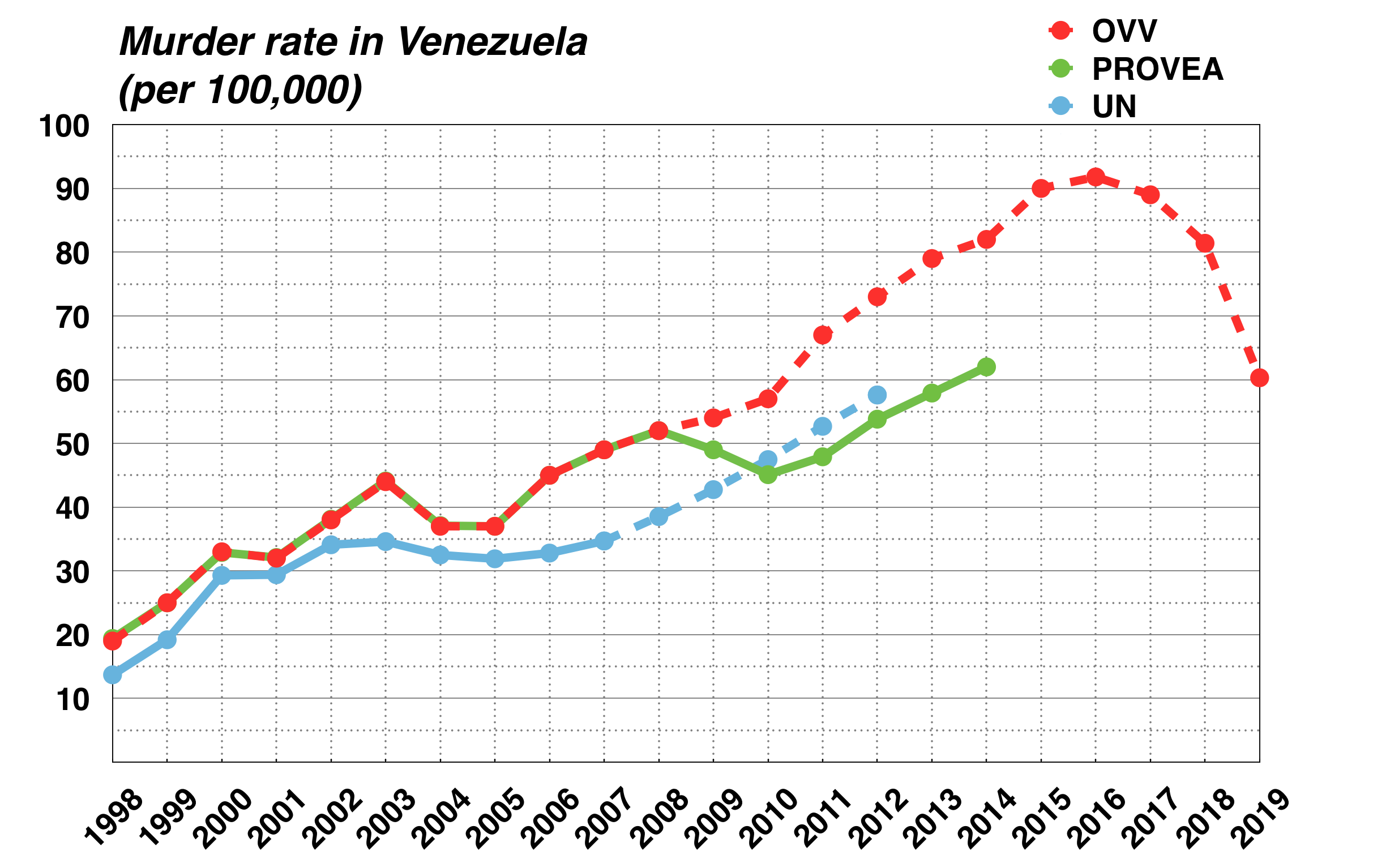
Murder rate (1 murder per 100,000 citizens) from 1998 to 2019. Sources: OVV, PROVEA, UN * UN line between 2007 and 2012 is simulated because of missing data.

=== History ===
==== Twentieth century ====
In the early-20th century, Venezuela was limited to violent crimes occurring in rural areas. In the 1950s, the rapid urbanization of the population saw some rises in violent crime. In the 1960s following the restoration of democracy, insecurity rose when FALN leftist guerrillas participated in violent confrontations with the government, though such clashes subsided due to lack of public support for the guerrilla movement. Between the 1960s until the late-1980s, the murder rate stood between 8 and 10 homicides per 100,000. Following the "institutional crisis" surrounding the Venezuelan government and the socioeconomic issues shown during the Caracazo riots in 1989 and Hugo Chávez's 1992 coup attempts, homicides increased in Venezuela. This introduced to the Venezuelan population the notion of not following the societal rules and using violence to achieve goals, such as widespread looting during the Caracazo or by attempting to commit undemocratic coups such as in 1992. By 1993, Venezuela's murder rate stood at 21 homicides per 100,000 people. In 1994, when Rafael Caldera became president, he attempted to strengthen Venezuela's "institution", staying in the center of political issues, performing both conservative and reformative actions that resulted in the increase of the murder rate stopping; though his popularity and the public's trust in the political system decreased. According to the OVV, since 2000, some 250,000 homicides have been committed, most of them with firearms.

==== Bolivarian Revolution ====
When you have a functioning democracy and you have the opposition and the government in power, there's different solutions to problems; people debate, people discuss. In Venezuela, debate and discussion is not what the government is interested in, they want only loyalty. So if you have a police force, it's not about whether you're doing your job, it's about whether you're a revolutionary. So it doesn't matter what the statistics are, are you with the government or are you not with the government.

— Thor Halvorssen, founder of the Human Rights Foundation

Under Hugo Chávez, Venezuela institutionality deteriorated, with political instability, impunity and violent government language increasing. According to Gareth A. Jones and Dennis Rodgers in their book Youth violence in Latin America: Gangs and Juvenile Justice in Perspective, "With the change of political regime in 1999 and the initiation of the Bolivarian Revolution, a period of transformation and political conflict began, marked by a further increase in the number and rate of violent deaths" showing that in four years, the murder rate had increased from 25 per 100,000 in 1999 to 44 per 100,000 in 2003. The Bolivarian Revolution attempted to "destroy what previously existed, the status quo of society" with instability increasing. The Bolivarian government then believed that violence and crime were due to poverty and inequality, though while the government boasted about reducing both poverty and inequality, the murder rate continued to increase in Venezuela. The rise of murders in Venezuela following the Chávez presidency has also been attributed by experts to the corruption of Venezuelan authorities, poor gun control and a poor judiciary system. The Chávez government banned private gun ownership in 2012 but the overall crime rate continued to increase. In some cases, crime has grown so pervasive in Venezuela that the military is ordered to avoid public places during nighttime hours since criminals often attempt to steal their weapons, with robberies in the country often targeting unaware individuals using a 'kill first, steal later' method.

Escalating violent crime, especially murder, had been called "perhaps the biggest concern" of Venezuelans during the nationwide crisis. According to The New Yorker magazine Venezuela had "by various measures, the world's highest violent-crime rate" in 2017, and almost none of crimes that are reported are prosecuted. InSight Crime says the crisis has "all too often been obscured by the government's reluctance to release damning crime statistics". The New Yorker reporter found that even stairwells in a public hospital were not safe from robbers, who preyed on staff and patients despite the large number of security forces guarding the hospital, saying this was because the police were assigned to contain journalists who might embarrass the government with exposés on the state of the hospital; they were not assigned to protect its occupants. The police allegedly collaborated with the robbers, receiving a cut of what they stole.

The U.S. Bureau of Diplomatic Security says most of the violence comes from organized street gangs, and attributes criminal activity to four factors: "often corrupt" underpaid police, an "inefficient and politicized judicial system", problems in the prison system, and widespread availability of weapons.

=== Homicide data ===
Venezuela is currently among the countries with the highest murder rates in the world. Recently, the murder rate in Venezuela is the subject of some dispute according to the Associated Press, since Bolivarian government slowly denied access to homicide statistics. A non-governmental organization known as the Venezuelan Violence Observatory (OVV), which collects crime data from seven different universities around the country, provides data of homicide rates in Venezuela.

In 2010, The New York Times stated that according to news reports, data from human rights groups, such as the OVV's statistics, may actually be undercounting the number of those murdered in Venezuela. According to the Venezuelan non-governmental organization PROVEA, unlike other NGOs, the Venezuelan government excludes homicide data that includes fighting or police related deaths in its murder rate statistics. PROVEA figures provided in the UN's 2014 Global Homicide Book put Venezuela's homicide rate at 53.7 murders per 100,000 inhabitants in 2012, closer to the Venezuelan government's 2012 estimate, but still the second highest peacetime murder rate in the world after Honduras (estimated at 90.4).

The OVV puts the homicide rate for 2013 at approximately 79 per 100,000 and the murder rate in the capital Caracas at 122 per 100,000 residents. According to the Venezuelan government, the homicide rate in 2013 dropped from 50 to 39 per 100,000. In 2015, the OVV's murder rate data showed an increase of the rate to 90 per 100,000 with an estimated 27,878 Venezuelans murdered adding up to nearly 20% of murders in the Latin American region. Attorney General Luisa Ortega Díaz stated to the United Nations that the rate was 62 per 100,000 for 2014, nearly twice as high as claimed in 2013. According to the World Bank, the 2016 homicide rate was 56 per 100,000, making Venezuela third in the world, after El Salvador and Honduras. OVV data has 23,047 homicides committed in Venezuela in 2018, a rate of 81.4 per 100,000 people, with the decline being attributed to emigration. The government says there were 60 daily homicides in 2016, and 45 daily in 2015, corresponding with Venezuela's downward economic spiral, according to NBC News; the OVV says the numbers are higher. In 2017, Luisa Ortega stated that Public Ministry had registered a rate of 70 per 100,000.

By 2018, Venezuela's murder rate–described as the highest in the world–had begun to decrease according to the OVV, with the organization stating that this downward trend was due to the millions of Venezuelans that emigrated from the country at the time. The U.S. Bureau of Diplomatic Security stated that there were 73 daily violent deaths in 2018. In 2019, the murder rate declined significantly to 60.3.

==== Other homicide data ====
According to Sanjuan, 95% of Venezuela's homicide victims are men with 69% of them being between ages 15 and 34. In 2000, the homicide rate for young men was 225 per 100,000. Sanjuan data from 2000 shows that in the capital city of Caracas, 92% of homicides are due to firearms and that 83% of homicide victims died near their homes, 55% in public altercations and 55% of the homicides occurred on the weekend. A more recent 2014 UNICEF report titled Hidden in Plain Sight, it was stated that in Venezuela, along with other Latin American countries, the leading cause of death for males between 10 and 19 is murder.

=== Censorship of violence ===
In 2009, it was reported that Venezuelan authorities would assign judicial police to Caracas area morgues to speak with families. At that time, they would advise families not to speak to report the murder of their family member to the media in exchange to have the process of recovering the victims body in an expedited manner. It was also reported that police would intercept the families of the victims and take them to the library of the University Institute of the Scientific Police (IUPOLC) where authorities offered families ways to "streamline procedures and advise them not to give information to the press in return for their aid". The cover ups were possibly performed following an El Nacional cover story showing piles of corpses scattered throughout a morgue in Venezuela.

=== Violence against women ===
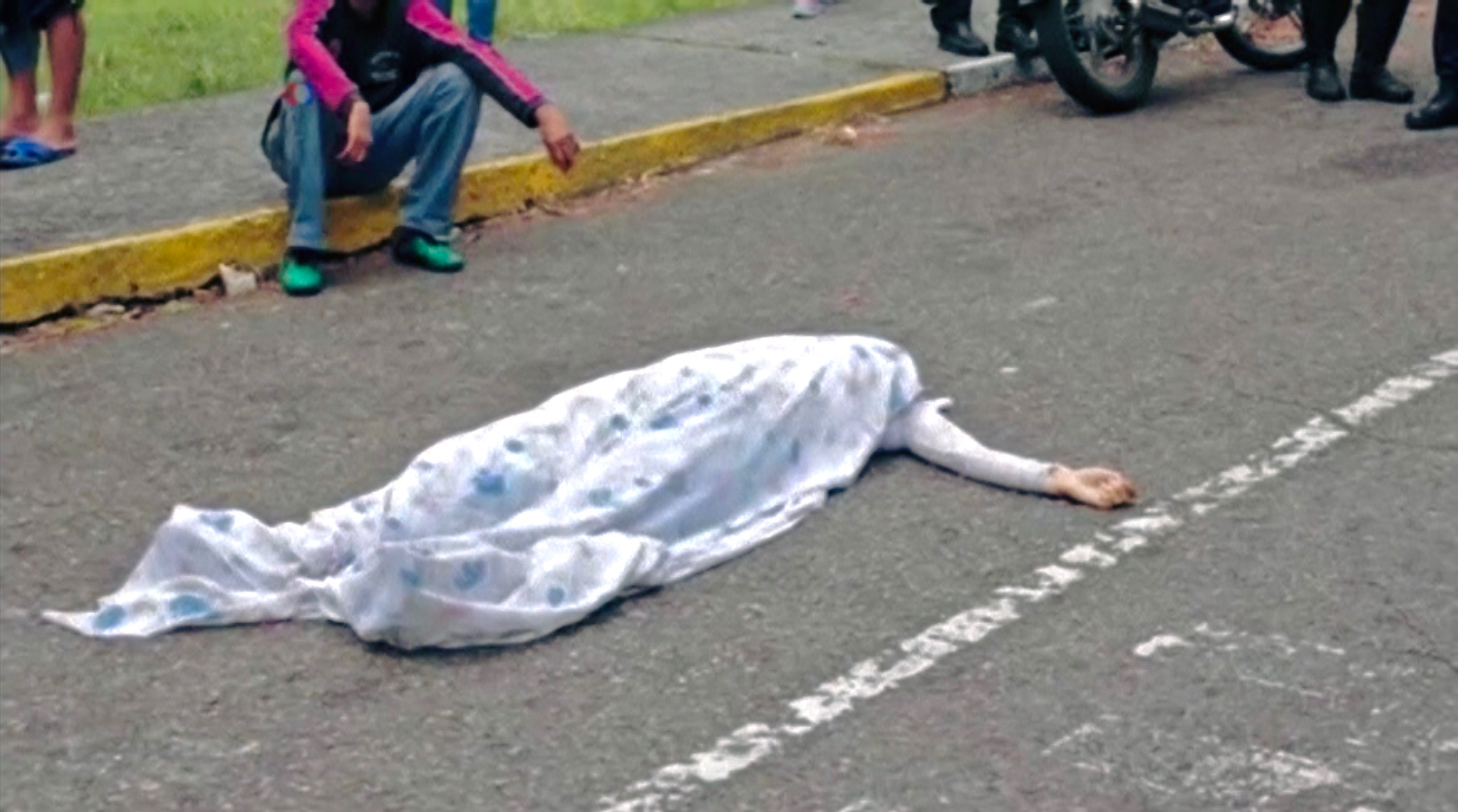
Paola Ramírez, a female student killed during the 2017 Venezuelan protests

Violence against women in Venezuela occurs in Venezuela. With corruption and the crisis in Venezuela, offenders are not being prosecuted. In 2014, only 0.7% of the official complaints of violence towards women resulted in trials. There is a United Nations database on Violence against women in Venezuela.

== Kidnappings ==
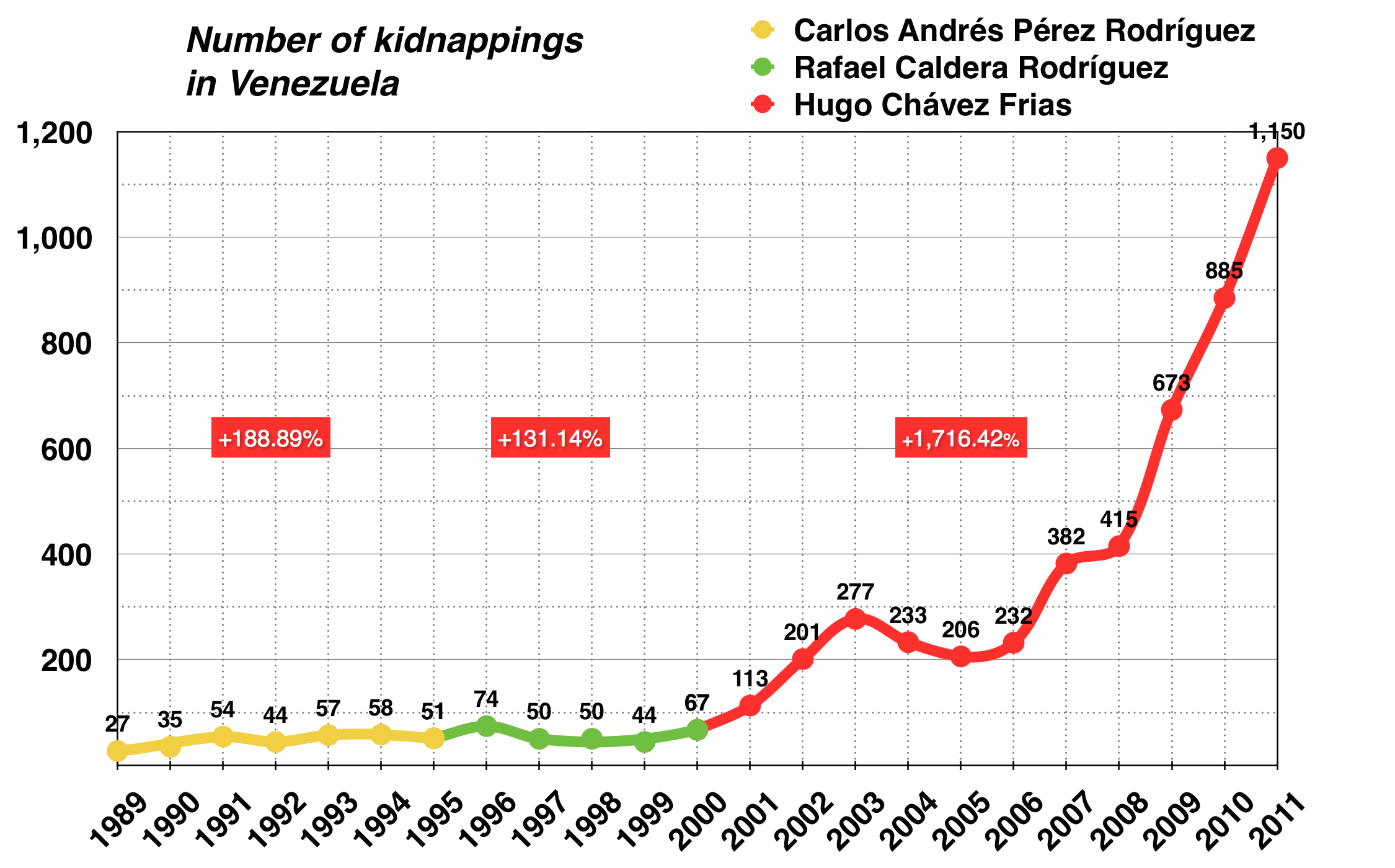
Number of kidnappings in Venezuela 1989–2011. Source: CICPC * Express kidnappings may not be included in data.

Director James Brabazon stated that "kidnapping crimes had skyrocketed ... after late Venezuelan President Hugo Chavez freed thousands of violent prisoners as part of controversial criminal justice system reforms" while also increasing due to Colombian organized crime as well. He further explained that criminals felt that the Venezuelan government did not care for the problems of the higher classes, which in turn gave them a sense of impunity that created a large business of kidnapping. Both the rich and poor are victims of kidnapping and criminals even fear being kidnapped by more powerful gangs.

In leaked government INE data for kidnappings in the year 2009, the number of kidnappings were at an estimated 16,917, contrasting the CICPCs number of only 673, before the Venezuelan government blocked the data. According to the leaked INE report, only 1,332 investigations for kidnappings were opened or about 7% of the total kidnapping cases, with 90% of the kidnappings happening away from rural areas, 80% of all being express kidnappings and the most common victim being lower-middle or middle class Venezuelans and middle-aged men.

In 2011, the Venezuelan government's statistics reported an average of two kidnappings per day, while other estimates showed 50 kidnappings per day. According to the BBC article, 4 of 5 kidnappings are express kidnappings which are not included in government statistics. The article also explains the problem of police involvement with kidnappings, with the Venezuelan government admitting that 20% of crimes involve authorities and criminologist Mármol García stating that 90% of kidnappings go unreported in Venezuela. In 2013, consulting firm Control Risk ranked Venezuela 5th in the world for kidnappings, only behind Mexico, India, Nigeria and Pakistan. The report stated that 33% of kidnappings occurred in the capital city of Caracas and that hundreds of kidnappings happen every year. News.com.au called Venezuela capital "the kidnap capital of the world" in 2013, noting that Venezuela had the highest kidnapping rate in the world and that 5 people were kidnapped for a ransom every day.

False or "virtual" kidnappings are also used in Venezuela. Criminals will cut off access to family members and then report to the family that they have been kidnapped, demanding a ransom without actually imprisoning an individual. In Venezuela's prisons, inmates will use "telemarketing" strategies, creating fear in individuals so that they will pay before possibly being kidnapped.

There is no reliable data on kidnapping in Venezuela and available data is considered an underestimate. While it is against the law to pay a ransom, according to criminologists, at least 80% of kidnappings are not reported for fear of retaliation, or because relatives prefer to negotiate, hoping the hostage will be released and fearing they will be killed if authorities are contacted. Available data underestimates the amount of express kidnapping, where victims are typically released in less than two days after relatives pay a quick ransom. Most kidnapping victims are released after a ransom is paid, but in 2016, at least 18 kidnapped people were killed. At least 80% of kidnappings occur in a limited area around Caracas and including Miranda State. In the areas where most kidnappings occur, the government set up so-called "peace zones" where official police withdrew and criminal gangs took over; according to NBC News, "experts say the government has armed these groups ... [who] ... control large territories, financed through extortion and the drug trade".

=== Authorities involved in kidnappings ===
Many kidnappings are not reported to police in Venezuela since they are not trusted. According to Anthony Daquín, former adviser to the Minister of Interior and Justice of Venezuela, "[s]taff of the Directorate of Military Counterintelligence and SEBIN (Bolivarian National Intelligence Service) operate these bands kidnapping and extortion". According to experts, kidnappings and torture by the Directorate of Military Counterintelligence increased during the 8-year tenure of Hugo Carvajal.

=== Combating kidnappings ===
According to Brabazon, businesses, families and friends gather money and put it aside for in the event they need it to pay kidnapping ransoms. Wealthy Venezuelans invest in armored vehicles and bodyguards, while middle class Venezuelans change routes to work frequently, refrain from wearing jewelry in public, and never travel on foot alone. Since the local police are not trusted by Venezuelans, kidnappings are usually not reported and cannot be combated by the authorities.

== Drug trade ==
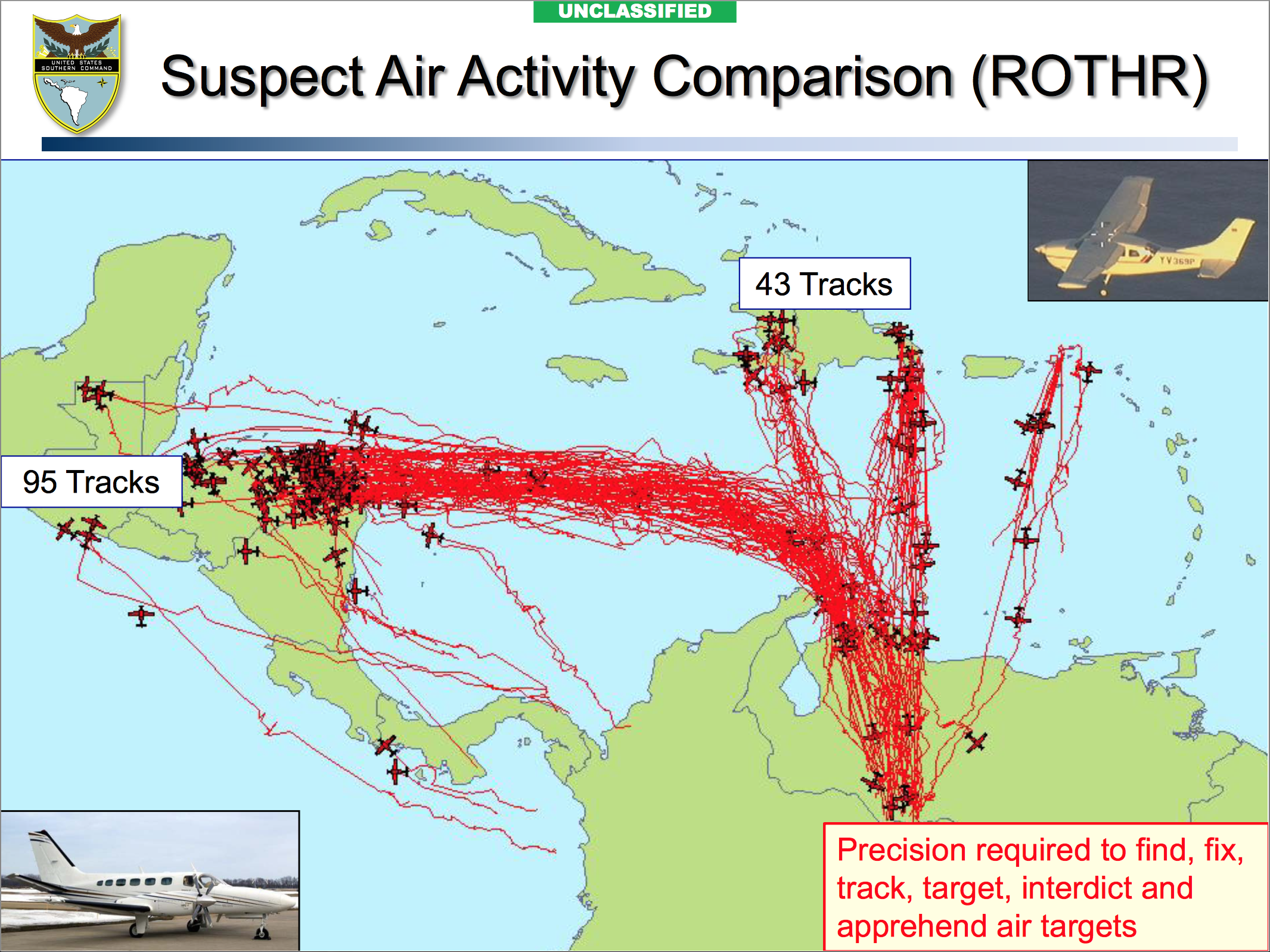
Aircraft activity of drug trafficking suspects tracked by the United States Southern Command showing multiple drug flights from Venezuela in 2010

Venezuela is a significant route for drug trafficking, with Colombian cocaine and other drugs transiting Venezuela towards the United States and Europe. Venezuela ranks fourth in the world for cocaine seizures, behind Colombia, the United States, and Panama.

In 2007, authorities in Colombia claimed that through laptops they had seized on a raid against Raul Reyes, they found documents purporting to show that Hugo Chávez offered payments of as much as US$300 million to the FARC. According to Interpol, the files found by Colombian forces were considered to be authentic.

Independent analyses of the documents by a number of U.S. academics and journalists have challenged the Colombian interpretation of the documents, accusing the Colombian government of exaggerating their contents. According to Greg Palast, the claim about Chavez's $300 million is based on the following (translated) sentence: "With relation to the 300, which from now on we will call 'dossier', efforts are now going forward at the instructions of the cojo [slang term for 'cripple'], which I will explain in a separate note." Palast suggests that the "300" is supposedly a reference to "300 prisoners" (the number involved in a FARC prisoner exchange) and not "300 million", as Raul Reyes was one of the Farc's main negotiators for prisoner exchanges.

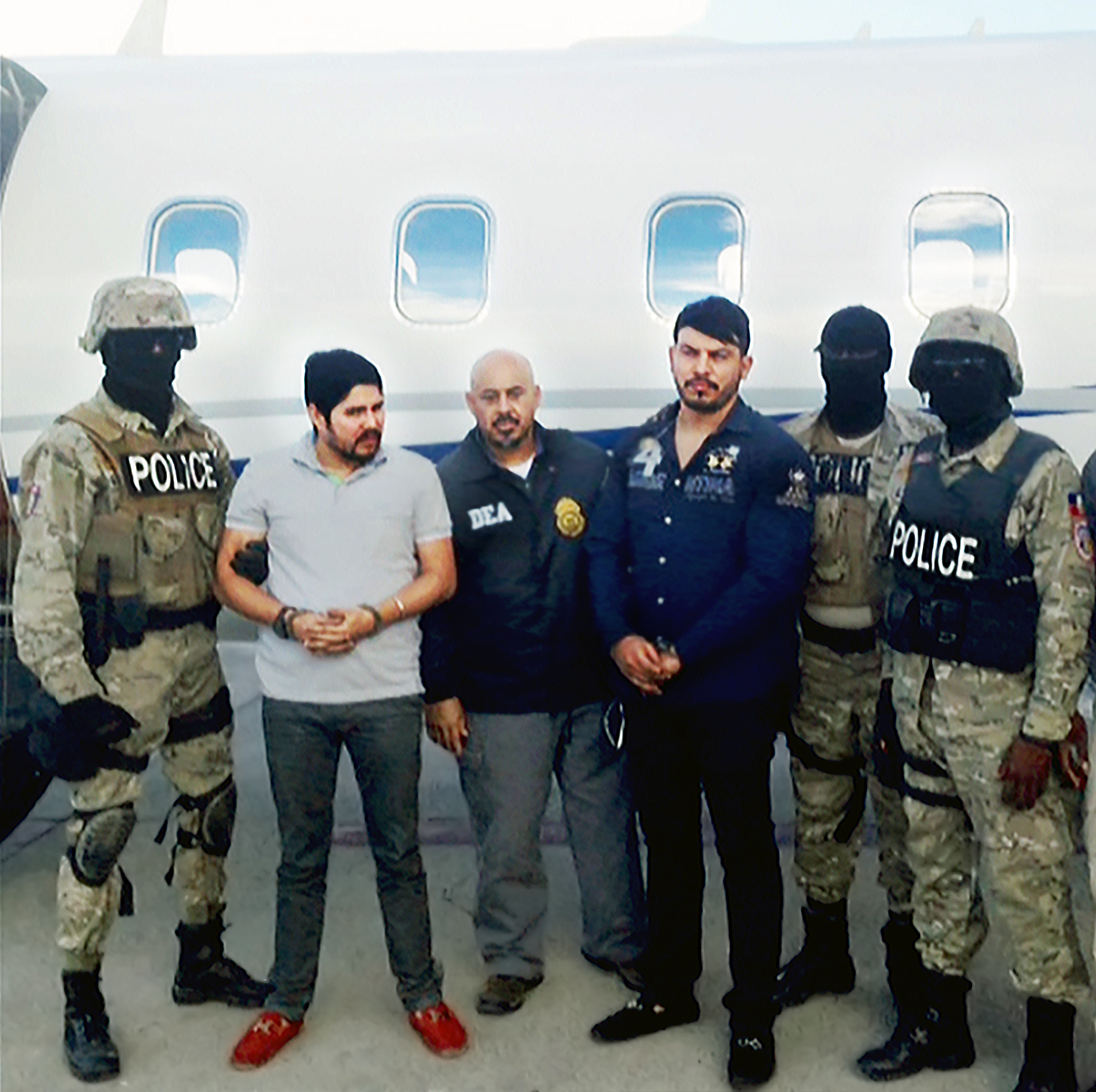
The nephews of President Nicolás Maduro, Efraín Antonio Campo Flores and Francisco Flores de Freitas, after their arrest by the United States Drug Enforcement Administration on 10 November 2015

In 2008, the U.S. Department of Treasury accused two senior Venezuelan government officials and one former official of providing material assistance for drug-trafficking operations carried out by the FARC guerrilla group in Colombia. In March 2012, Venezuela's National Assembly removed Supreme Court Justice Eladio Aponte Aponte from his post after an investigation revealed alleged ties to drug-trafficking; on the day he was to face questioning, Aponte Aponte fled the country, and has sought refuge in the U.S., where he began to cooperate with the Drug Enforcement Administration (DEA) and the Department of Justice. Aponte says that, while serving as a judge, he was forced to acquit an army commander who had connections with a 2 metric ton shipment of cocaine. Aponte also claimed that Henry Rangel, former defense minister of Venezuela and General Clíver Alcalá Cordones were both involved with the drug trade in Venezuela. Venezuelan officials have also been allegedly working with Mexican drug cartels.

In September 2013, an incident involving men from the Venezuelan National Guard placing 31 suitcases containing 1.3 tons of cocaine on a Paris flight astonished French authorities. On 15 February 2014, a commander for the Guard was stopped while driving to Valencia with his family and was arrested for having 554 kilos of cocaine in his possession.

Two nephews of Maduro's wife Cilia Flores, Efraín Antonio Campo Flores and Francisco Flores de Freitas, were involved in the narcosobrinos incident and found guilty for their alleged involvement in illicit activities such as drug trafficking in November 2016, with some of their funds possibly assisting President Maduro's presidential campaign in the 2013 Venezuelan presidential election and potentially for the 2015 Venezuelan parliamentary elections, with the funds mainly used to "help their family stay in power". One informant stated that the two would often fly out of Terminal 4 of Simon Bolivar International Airport, a terminal reserved for the president. Due to the fact that the "sobrinos" (nephews in Spanish) of Maduro and his wife Cilia Flores were arrested for narcotics trafficking, the media described the nephews as the narcosobrinos.

== Human trafficking ==
According to the Trafficking in Persons Report 2014 by the State Department of the United States, "Venezuela is a source, transit, and destination country for men, women, and children subjected to sex trafficking and forced labor". The State Department also states that the "Government of Venezuela does not fully comply with the minimum standards for the elimination of trafficking" explaining that Venezuelan authorities trained government officials about trafficking, but the Venezuelan government "did not publicly document progress on prosecutions and convictions of trafficking offenders or on victim identification and assistance". Due to the Venezuelan government not complying to the standards of stopping human trafficking, the State Department placed Venezuelan on its "black list" as a Tier 3 country, which opened the possibility of Venezuela facing sanctions.

== Organized crime ==
"Peace zones", seen in red, offered to gangs by the Bolivarian government

There was little history of organized crime in Venezuela until the start of the Bolivarian Revolution. The Bolivarian government was seen as being lenient on crime and justifying the criminals by saying they were poor and exploited. In 2013, the government negotiated with large criminal gangs on how to prevent violence and agreed to avoid policing gang territory in what were known as "peace zones", reinforcing criminal behaviors and making gang practices de facto law. According to InSight Crime, there are over a dozen mega-gangs in Venezuela, with some having up to 300 members.

Due to the largely unofficial economy that exists in Venezuela in which nearly every citizen participates, organized crime thrived as smuggling has been assisted by Colombian gangs, the Bolivarian National Guard and government officials.

At least 80% of kidnappings occur in a limited area around Caracas and including Miranda State. Most kidnappings occur around "peace zones" where official police withdrew and gangs took over; according to NBC News, "experts say the government has armed these groups ... [who] ... control large territories, financed through extortion and the drug trade".

=== Colectivos ===
El País reported in 2014 that Chávez had years earlier assigned colectivos to be "the armed wing of the Bolivarian Revolution" for the Venezuelan government, giving them weapons, communication systems, motorcycles and surveillance equipment to exercise control in the hills of Caracas where police are forbidden entry. In 2006, they received arms and funding from the state when they were brought under the government's community councils. Chávez eliminated the Metropolitan Police in 2011, turning security over to the colectivos in some Caracas barrios. Some weapons given to the groups include assault rifles, submachine guns and grenades. Despite the Venezuelan government's statements saying that only official authorities can carry weapons for the defense of Venezuela, colectivos are armed with automatic rifles such as AK-47s, submachine guns, fragmentation grenades, and tear gas.

During the 2014 Venezuelan protests against Maduro, colectivos acted against the opposition protesters. The Civil Association for Citizen Control said that more than half of those killed during the protests were killed by colectivos. Human Rights Watch described colectivos as "armed gangs who use violence with impunity" to harass political opponents of the Venezuelan government. Amnesty International calls them "armed pro-government supporters who are tolerated or supported by the authorities". An Organization of American States report on human rights violations in Venezuela stated that colectivos murdered at least 131 individuals between 2014 and 2017 during the anti-government protests.

Colectivos sometimes provide protection from crime in some neighborhoods they are committed to, though some neighborhoods report that colectivos attack neighbors themselves. As colectivos attempted to gain independence from the government, they began "controlling organized crime like drug trafficking in Caracas barrios". According to the International Crisis Group, colectivos may be involved in drug trafficking, arms dealing, and car theft. Phil Gunson, a freelance reporter for foreign media, states that, "It's no secret that many colectivos engage in criminal activities." Gunson reported that colectivos combat criminal gangs in neighborhoods and take over the previous gang's business in crime and also take over buildings already owned by individuals and collect rent from the owners. Colectivos are thought to be partially responsible for the increase in the Venezuelan murder rate, according to the Metropolitan Observatory on Citizen Security. FOX News says that, "Much of the crime has been attributed by analysts to government-backed gangs—referred to in Spanish as “colectivos”—who were deliberately put in place by the government", and that "while Venezuelan citizens were stripped of their legal recourse to bear arms, the 'collectivos'—established by Chavez when came to power—were legally locked and loaded," critics say. Some colectivos patrol the 23 de Enero barrio on motorcycles, masked and armed, supposedly to protect the neighborhood from criminals such as drug dealers. According to ABC News, "it is widely believed that colectivos kill drug traffickers who do not obey their orders".

During the 2019 Venezuelan blackouts in March, Maduro called on the armed paramilitary gangs, saying, "The time has come for active resistance". As blackouts continued, on 31 March, citizens protested the lack of electricity and water in Caracas and other cities; Maduro called again on the colectivos, asking them "to defend the peace of every barrio, of every block". Videos circulated on social media showing colectivos threatening protesters and shooting in the streets; two protestors were shot.

== Corruption ==
Corruption in Venezuela is high by world standards, and has been for much of the 20th century. The discovery of oil worsened political corruption, and by the late 1970s, Juan Pablo Pérez Alfonso's description of oil as "the Devil's excrement" became a common expression in Venezuela. Venezuela has been ranked one of the most corrupt countries on the Corruption Perceptions Index, going back to the start of the survey in 1995. The 2010 ranking placed Venezuela at number 164, out of 178 ranked countries.

According to some sources, Venezuela's corruption includes widespread corruption in the police force. Many victims are afraid to report crimes to the police because most officers are involved with criminals and may bring even more harm to the victims. A 2013 Gallup study showed that only 26% of Venezuelans have faith in their local police. Human Rights Watch claims that the "police commit one of every five crimes" and that thousands of people have been killed by police officers acting with impunity (only 3% of officers have been charged in cases against them). The Metropolitan Police force in Caracas was so corrupt that it was accused of assisting some of the 17,000 kidnappings.

== Petty crime and thefts ==
Crime rates are higher in 'barrios' or 'ranchos' (slum areas) and after dark. Petty crime such as pick-pocketing is prevalent, particularly in public transport terminals in Caracas. As a result of the high levels of crime, Venezuelans were forced to change their ways of life due to the large insecurities they continuously experienced. 2014 Gallup polls showed that only 19% of Venezuelans felt safe walking alone at night, with nearly one quarter of the respondents stating that they or a household member had money stolen from them in the past year.

While Venezuelans were suffering from shortages in Venezuela, the occasional looting of trucks full of goods became more common in the country with the robberies being committed by criminal gangs. Originally, looters would wait for trucks to crash and loot the scene, though recently trucks have been attacked instead. In one incident involving a crashed truck, hundreds of men, women and children looted the vehicle. In July 2015, BBC News stated that due to the common shortages in Venezuela, every week there are videos shared online showing Venezuelans looting supermarkets and trucks for food. In June 2016, it was reported that the town of Cumaná was under effective curfew after an outbreak of mass looting. In 2017, it was revealed that even military personnel became targets, with criminals instead beginning to just kill all of their victims before stealing their belongings, introducing a more violent face to theft in the country.

Venezuela is especially dangerous toward foreign travelers and investors who are visiting. This is due to Venezuela's economic problems. The United States State Department and the Government of Canada have warned foreign visitors that they may be subjected to armed robbery, kidnapping and murder. In 2014, former Miss Venezuela 2004 winner Monica Spear and her husband were murdered with her 5-year-old daughter being shot while visiting, and an elderly German tourist was murdered only a few weeks later.

== Crime prevention ==
=== State crime prevention initiatives ===
During the presidency of the Hugo Chávez, more than 20 programs were created attempting to deter crime, though insecurity continued to increase following their implementation. In 2009, the Venezuelan government created a security force called the Bolivarian National Police as well as a new Experimental Security University. Human rights groups suggest that the government's policing efforts are too "timid". The United Nations has stated that the Venezuelan government is lacking 20,000 investigative police.

Chávez's successor, Nicolás Maduro, has also initiated programs trying to combat crime. Under his administration, extrajudicial killings rose dramatically with over 8,000 Venezuelans being killed by state authorities between 2015 and 2017.

==== Ley contra el Secuestro y la Extorsión ====
In 2008, the National Assembly passed the Law Against Kidnapping and Extortion (Ley contra el Secuestro y la Extorsión), a law that imposes penalties of up to 30 years in prison to address a kidnapping situation that was not covered by a specific law. Despite the introduction of the new law, the majority of cases are not resolved and only received the Venezuelan government's attention in high-profile cases.

==== Plan Patria Segura ====
On 13 May 2013, President Nicolas Maduro initiated Plan Patria Segura saying "we have decided to fight to build a secure homeland". The plan, created by Miguel Rodríguez Torres, included the placement of 37,000 authorities throughout the country. The goal of Plan Patria Segura to disarm, prevent organized crime and drug enforcement. The methods of accomplishing these tasks were through surveillance, checking documents, verification checkpoints and to help guide communities. Some have criticized Plan Patria Segura calling it a failure after crime continued to increase following its implementation.

Days after the replacement of the plan's creator Miguel Rodríguez Torres by Carmen Meléndez as Minister of the Popular Power for Interior, Justice and Peace,

==== Disarmament ====
In 2013, it was reported that Venezuela was one of the most weaponized areas in the world, with one firearm per two citizens. On 22 September 2014, President Maduro announced that his government would invest $47 million to create 60 new disarmament centers, and $39 million to fund a plan under which soldiers would patrol the most dangerous neighborhoods. In a Cabo Vadillo (es) episode revealing crime in Caracas, it is stated that at the time of recording in 2014, there were over 5 million illegal firearms in a city of about 5 million people. Colectivos stated to the Venezuelan government that they were not going to participate in the disarmament plan, stating that they were groups involved with the Bolivarian Revolution and that criminal gangs should instead be focused on.

=== Judicial system ===
Venezuela's judicial system has been ranked the third most corrupt in the world by Transparency International and according to the World Justice Project's Rule of Law Index 2021, Venezuela had the worst rule of law in the world; having the second worst civil justice system in the world and the worst criminal justice system in the world.

==== Public opinion ====
The majority of Venezuelans surveyed in the Rule of Law Index 2015 believed the judicial system was corrupt with 98% believing the correctional system was ineffective while 100% thought the government had improper influence in the criminal justice system. The majority of Venezuelans also believed that there was a poor due process of law while also thinking that the criminal justice system was not timely and judgement was ineffective.

=== Prisons ===
Venezuelan prisons are led by "pranes" or criminal bosses that operate while jailed. During the tenure of Minister of Prison Services Iris Varela, pranes were given control of prisons with the belief that they would maintain leadership and lower violence. Instead, pranes run criminal organizations outside of prisons and receive security within their facilities.

In the World Report 2014 by Human Rights Watch, the organization stated that "Venezuelan prisons are among the most violent in Latin America". They explained that "Weak security, deteriorating infrastructure, overcrowding, insufficient and poorly trained guards, and corruption allow armed gangs to effectively control prisons". They also mentioned that hundreds of violent deaths occur at Venezuelan prisons each year. In 2014, the UN called the state of the Venezuelan prison system "a tragedy".

There are a total of 34 prisons in Venezuela holding about 50,000 inmates. According to the Venezuelan Observatory of Prisons (OVP), from 1999 to 2015, there were 22,998 violent incidents, with 16,417 injured and 6,581 inmates killed. Their occupancy level is at a shocking 153.9% according to 2016 studies. In the year 2000, the rate was only 58 per 100,000 people. Jumping to the year 2014, the rate was 166, and as of 2016 the rate was at 173

In 2018, Minister of Prison Service Iris Varela stated that when "[c]omparing the Venezuelan prison system with other penitentiary systems in the world, I can guarantee that this is the best in the world, because there have been no incidents", ignoring at least the April 2018 fire that occurred in the police station jails in Valencia, Carabobo where 68 people died per official figures.

The Acarigua prison riot in 2019, left 29 prisoners dead, and 19 guards injured. Over 40 inmates were killed and an unknown number of guards and inmates were wounded during a May 2020 incident at Los Llanos jail near the city of Guanare. Venezuelan authorities claimed the incident was an escape attempt by inmates, while the Venezuelan Prison Observatory noted the inmates were angry over insufficient food and water and called for an investigation.

==== Lack of state authority ====
In Venezuelan prisons, there are reports of prisoners having easy access to firearms, drugs and alcohol. According to Alessio Bruni of the United Nations Committee against Torture, "a typical problem of the prison system is gun violence, nearly circulating freely within prisons, causing hundreds and hundreds of people killed every year" with the UN committee alarmed at reports that between 2004 and 2014, 4,791 inmates were killed and 9,931 injured.

Carlos Nieto, head of Window to Freedom, alleges that heads of gangs acquire military weapons from the state saying, “They have the types of weapons that can only be obtained by the country's armed forces. ... No one else has these.” Use of internet and mobile phones are also a commonplace where criminals can take part in street crime while in prison. One prisoner explained how, “If the guards mess with us, we shoot them” and that he had "seen a man have his head cut off and people play football with it.”

In a Journeyman Pictures documentary titled Venezuela - Party Prison, a reporter visits San Antonio Prison on Margarita Island. The prison is described as a "paradise", with a community including pools, bars, a boxing ring and many other accommodations for any visitor of prisoners who can stay the night at the prison for up to three days per week. San Antonio Prison was controlled by El Conejo (The Rabbit), a powerful jailed drug trafficker who makes his "enforcers" patrol the prison. In an interview with Prison Minister Iris Varela, the minister explained how all prisons were under her control and that there was no anarchy. Varela was also known to be acquainted with El Conejo, as critic Carlos Nieto showed the reporter a photo of Varela with El Conejo on his bed. Professor Neelie Perez from the University of Caracas explained how it is difficult for the government to control prisons without resorting to violence, therefore recognizing and legitimizing high ranking prisoners as heads of prisons. Perez also states that evidence shows that crime is organized from within these prisons.

Edgardo Lander, a sociologist and professor at the Central University of Venezuela with a PhD in sociology from Harvard University explained that Venezuelan prisons are "practically a school for criminals" since young inmates come out "more sort of trained and hardened than when they went in". He also explained that prison are controlled by gangs and that "very little has been done" to control them.

==== "El Coliseo" ====
In Venezuelan prisons, inmates partake in gladiatorial matches to settle disputes. In 2011, the Inter-American Commission on Human Rights of the Organization of American States denounced the practice of "The Coliseum" saying "The Commission reiterates to the State the need to take immediate and effective steps to prevent such incidents from happening again" after two inmates died and 54 more were injured from these practices.

However a year later, one "Coliseum" in Uribana left 2 dead and 128 injured. Those injured had to be assisted by a church in the area.

==== Mismanaged facilities ====
In 2014, on average, Venezuelan prisons held 231% of their capacity, according to Alessio Bruni of the U.N. Committee against Torture. Bruni provided the example of the Tocorón Prison that in 2013 was holding 7,000 prisoners despite having been designed for 750.

Venezuelan rights groups report that the 34 prisons in Venezuela hold 50,000 people but are only supposed to hold about one-third of that. In 2012, La Planta, a prison built in 1964 with a capacity of 350 inmates, held almost 2,500 inmates with many armed with heavy weapons.

By 2018 deep into the crisis in Bolivarian Venezuela, prisoners suffered from starvation and communicable diseases in addition to violence as a result of the mismanagement and overcrowding of prisons.

In May 2020, inmates rioted at the Llanos Penitentiary Center in Guanare, leading to 40 deaths. The facility had been overcrowded by more than three times its designed capacity.

== Foreign visitors ==
Venezuela is an especially dangerous country for foreign travelers and investors who wish to visit it. This is due to Venezuela's economic problems. The U.S. State Department and the Government of Canada have warned foreign visitors that they may be subject to armed robbery, kidnapping and murder in Venezuela. Most tourists who die are murdered as a result of violent robbery, as criminals do not discriminate between their victims. In 2014, former Miss Venezuela 2004 winner Monica Spear and her husband were murdered in front of their 5-year-old daughter, who was wounded by a gunshot, during a visit to Venezuela, an event that shocked the entire country. An elderly German tourist was murdered just a few weeks later in Nueva Esparta.

== See also ==
- Law enforcement in Venezuela
- Crime and violence in Latin America
- Faddoul Brothers

== Bibliography ==
- World Drug Report 2010 Statistical Annex: Drug seizures (PDF). United Nations. 2010.
- Trafficking in Persons Report 2014 (PDF). United States Department of State. 2014. pp. 407–08.
