= Express kidnapping =

Abduction where a small immediate ransom is demanded

Express kidnapping (Spanish: secuestro exprés; Portuguese: sequestro relâmpago) is a method of abduction where a small immediate ransom is demanded, often by the victim being forced to withdraw money from an ATM, or more modernly to do a mobile money transfer.

Known in the United States since at least 1986, they are more commonly associated with urban areas of Latin America, such as Mexico, Venezuela, Peru, Brazil and Colombia. In some parts of Latin America, express kidnappings known as a millionaire tour (in Spanish paseo millonario) involve an innocent taxi cab passenger and a criminal driver, who stops to pick up associates. The passenger is taken to a variety of ATMs, and forced to "max out" their bank card at each.

This type of kidnapping does not require much experience or preparation and is suspected of being committed by inexperienced criminals more often than not.
