= Illegal drug trade in Venezuela =

In 2005, Venezuela severed ties with the United States Drug Enforcement Administration (DEA), accusing its representatives of spying. Following the departure of the DEA from Venezuela and the expansion of DEA's partnership with Colombia in 2005, Venezuela became more attractive to drug traffickers. Between 2008 and 2012, Venezuela's cocaine seizure ranking among other countries declined, going from being ranked fourth in the world for cocaine seizures in 2008 to sixth in the world in 2012.

== Drug trafficking routes ==
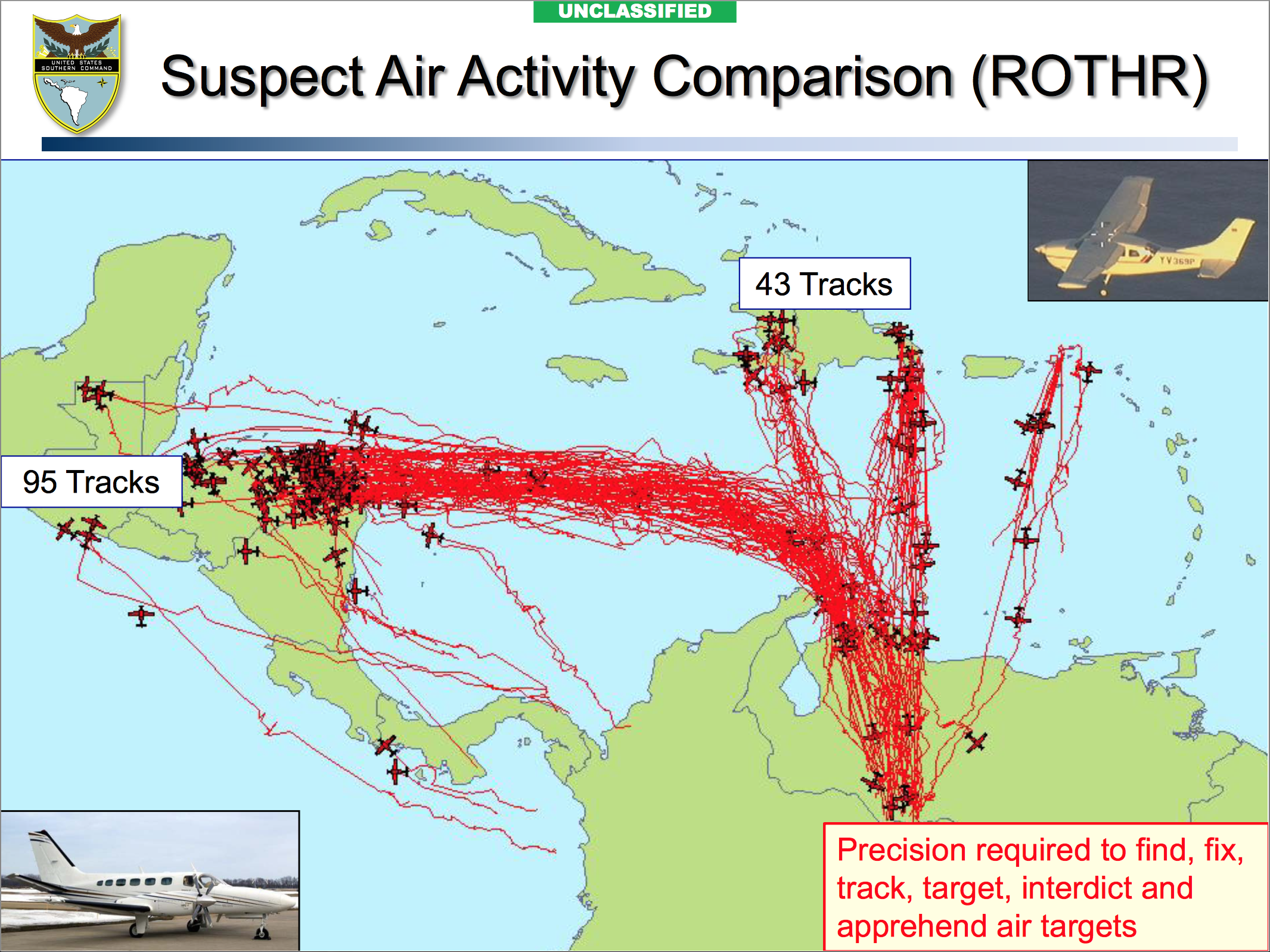
Aircraft activity of drug trafficking suspects tracked by the United States Southern Command showing multiple drug flights from Venezuela in 2010

According to a 2009 US report, 90% of US cocaine is sourced from Colombia, with Venezuela and the Caribbean accounting for around 10% of US-destined cocaine trans-shipments in 2010. Another significant route is directed to export cocaine, marijuana and other illegal drugs via direct sea shipments from Venezuela to Europe, with half of all direct shipments to Europe between 2006 and 2008 originating in Venezuela. (Note: Another route sees shipments by air via West Africa to Spain to be distributed in Europe.) For decades, Venezuela has been a major transit hub for cocaine trafficking, but had not been a major producer of cocaine until the 2010s.

=== Aircraft routes ===
In 2012, the United States stated that the majority of aircraft related to drug trafficking originate from Venezuela's border area near Colombia, with "almost all the planes that land in Honduras, the focal point of Central American air drug trafficking, come from Venezuela."

In Apure, Colombian guerrilla group FARC had set up locations in the state, creating multiple airfields in the region. In September 2013, 31 suitcases containing 1.3 tons of cocaine on an Air France flight astonished Paris authorities as it was the largest seizure of cocaine recorded in mainland France.

At a presentation at the XXXII International Conference on Drugs in 2015, commander of the United States Southern Command General John Kelly stated that though relations with other Latin American nations countering drug trafficking has been good, Venezuela was not as cooperative and that "there's a lot of cocaine leaving Venezuela to the world market". General Kelly also stated that almost all shipments of cocaine using aircraft comes out of Venezuela and that since 2013 to early-2014, the route of drug trafficking aircraft has changed from heading to Central America to primarily traveling through Caribbean islands.

== Groups involved ==
Since 2012, the United States government has stated that "generally permissive security forces and a corrupt political environment have made Venezuela one of the preferred routes of cocaine trafficking from South America", noting that drug trafficking organizations ranging from Mexican cartels, such as El Tren de Aragua, Los Zetas, Ángeles Caído and the Sinaloa Cartel, to armed far-right Colombian organizations and the FARC and ELN, have operated from Venezuela. According to the United States, "elements of the Venezuelan security forces have assisted these drug trafficking organizations".

=== Cuntrera-Caruana Mafia clan ===
In the early 1970s, affiliates of the Cuntrera-Caruana Mafia clan moved to Venezuela, which became an important hideout as the clan bought hotels and founded various businesses in Caracas and Valencia, as well as an extended ranch in Barinas, near the Colombian border. "Venezuela has its own Cosa Nostra family as if it is Sicilian territory," according to the Italian police. "The structure and hierarchy of the Mafia has been entirely reproduced in Venezuela." The Cuntrera-Caruana clan had direct links with the ruling Commission of the Sicilian Mafia, and were known as the "bankers of the Cosa Nostra", due to their ability to launder a massive amount of money of the Mafia.

Pasquale, Paolo and Gaspare Cuntrera were expelled from Venezuela in 1992, "almost secretly smuggled out of the country, as if it concerned one of their own drug transports. It was imperative they could not contact people on the outside who could have used their political connections to stop the expulsion. " Their expulsion was ordered by a commission of the Venezuelan Senate headed by Senator Cristobal Fernandez Dalo and his money laundering investigator, Thor Halvorssen Hellum. They were arrested in September 1992 at Fiumicino airport (Rome), and in 1996 were sentenced to 13–20 years.

=== Norte del Valle Cartel ===
In 2008, the leader of the Colombian Norte del Valle Cartel, Wilber Varela, was found murdered in a hotel in Mérida in Venezuela.

=== Venezuelan government ===
According to Jackson Diehl, Deputy Editorial Page Editor of The Washington Post, the Bolivarian Government of Venezuela shelters "one of the world's biggest drug cartels". There have also been allegations that former president Hugo Chávez and Diosdado Cabello being involved with drug trafficking.

In May 2015, The Wall Street Journal reported from United States officials that drug trafficking in Venezuela increased significantly with Colombian drug traffickers moving from Colombia to Venezuela due to pressure from law enforcement. One United States Department of Justice official described the higher ranks of the Venezuelan government and military as "a criminal organization", with high ranking Venezuelan officials, such as National Assembly President Diosdado Cabello, being accused of drug trafficking and chief of Cartel of the Suns. Those involved with investigations stated that Venezuelan government defectors and former traffickers had given information to investigators and that details of those involved in government drug trafficking were increasing.

==== Narcosobrinos incident ====
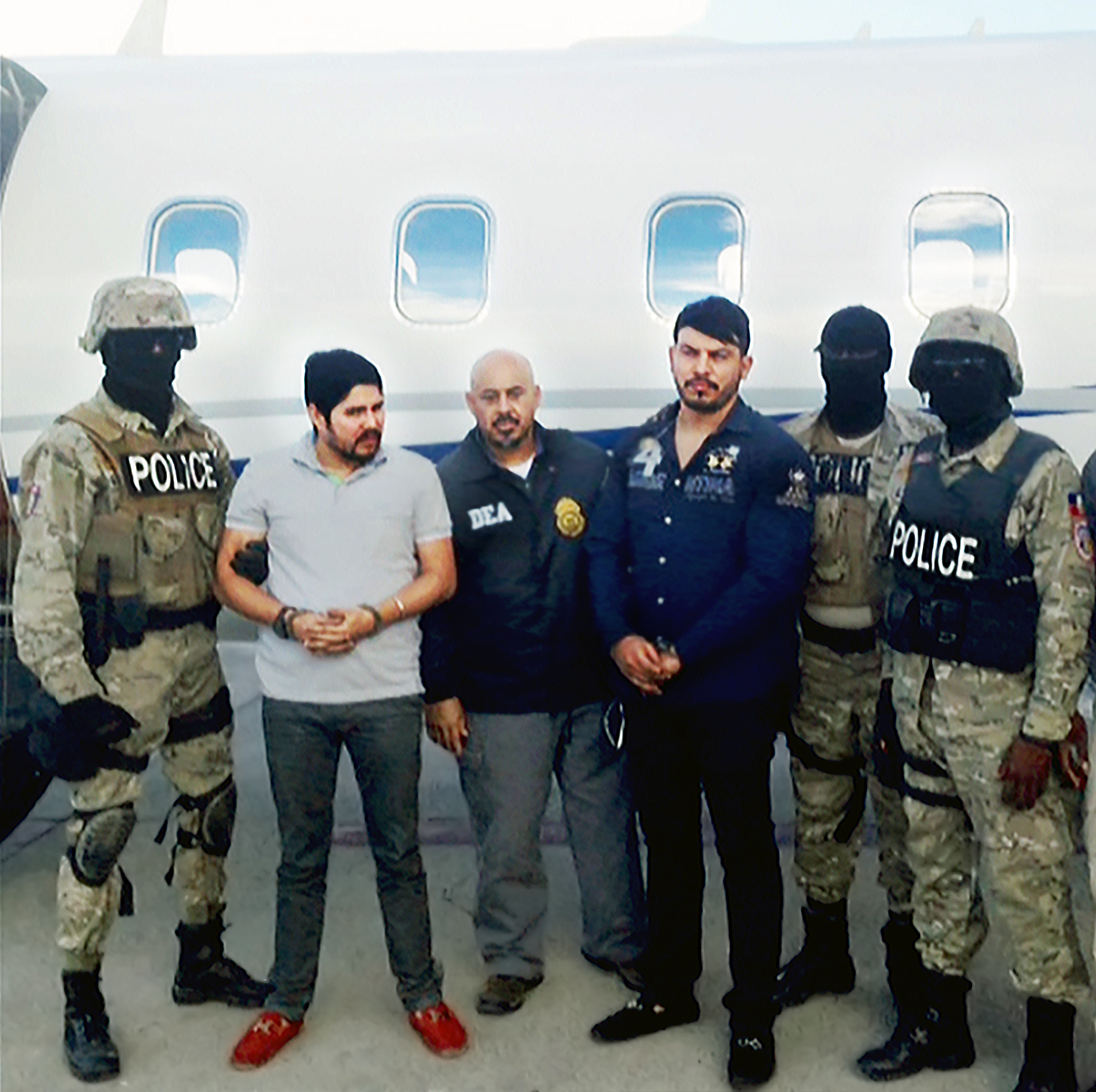
The nephews of President Nicolás Maduro, Efraín Antonio Campo Flores and Francisco Flores de Freitas, after their arrest by the United States Drug Enforcement Administration on 10 November 2015

In October and November 2015, the Drug Enforcement Administration (DEA) began monitoring two nephews of President Nicolás Maduro's wife Cilia Flores—Efraín Antonio Campo Flores and Francisco Flores de Freites—after the two had contacted a person that was a DEA informant. They wanted advice as how to traffic cocaine. They brought to the meeting a kilogram of the drug so that the informant could understand its quality. On 10 November 2015, Campo Flores and Flores de Freites, were arrested in Port-au-Prince, Haiti by local police while attempting to make a deal to transport 800 kilograms of cocaine destined for New York City and were turned over to the DEA where they were flown directly to the United States. The men flew from a hangar reserved for the President of Venezuela in Simón Bolívar International Airport into Haiti while being assisted by Venezuelan military personnel, which included two presidential honor guards, with the nephews carrying Venezuelan diplomatic passports which did not have diplomatic immunity according to former head of DEA international operations Michael Vigil. A later raid of Efraín Antonio Campo Flores' "Casa de Campo" mansion and yacht in the Dominican Republic revealed an additional 280 lbs of cocaine and 22 lbs of heroin, with 176 lbs of the drugs found in the home while the remainder was discovered in his yacht.

Campo stated on the DEA plane that he was the step son of President Maduro and that he grew up in the Maduro household while being raised by Maduro's wife, Cilia Flores. When the two learned that they did not have diplomatic immunity, they began to give names of those involved, allegedly naming former National Assembly President Diosdado Cabello, and Governor of Aragua State Tareck El Aissami. It is expected that without cooperating with investigators, Maduro's nephews could face between 20 and 30 years in prison. Due to the extradition process, New York courts could not apprehend those who assisted the nephews on their way to Haiti. The incident happened at a time when multiple high-ranking members of the Venezuelan government were being investigated for their involvement of drug trafficking, including Walter Jacobo Gavidia, Flores' son who is a Caracas judge, as well as Diosdado Cabello and Tarek El Aissami.

On November 18, 2016, the two nephews were found guilty, with the cash allegedly destined to .."help their family stay in power".

==== FARC ties ====
In 2008, the U.S. Department of Treasury accused two senior Venezuelan government officials and one former official of providing material assistance for drug-trafficking operations carried out by the FARC guerrilla group in Colombia. In the same year, the Secretary General of the Organization of American States, Jose Miguel Insulza, testified before the U.S. Congress that "there are no evidences [sic]" that Venezuela is supporting "terrorist groups", including the FARC. In a 2009 United States Congress report, it was stated that corruption in the Venezuelan armed forces was facilitating Colombian FARC guerillas' drug trafficking.

In March 2012, Venezuela's National Assembly removed Supreme Court Justice Eladio Aponte Aponte from his post after an investigation revealed alleged ties to drug-trafficking. On the day he was to face questioning, Aponte Aponte fled the country, and has sought refuge in the U.S., where he began to cooperate with the Drug Enforcement Administration (DEA) and the Department of Justice. Aponte says that, while serving as a judge. he was forced to acquit an army commander who had connections with a 2 metric ton shipment of cocaine. Aponte also claimed that Henry Rangel, former defense minister of Venezuela and General Clíver Alcalá Cordones were both involved with the drug trade in Venezuela. Venezuelan officials have also been allegedly working with Mexican drug cartels.

In September 2013, an incident involving men from the Venezuelan National Guard placing 31 suitcases containing 1.3 tons of cocaine on a Paris flight astonished French authorities. On 15 February 2014, a commander for the Guard was stopped while driving to Valencia with his family and was arrested for having 554 kilos of cocaine in his possession. According to Colombian weekly Revista Semana, the director of the Dirección General de Inteligencia Militar (DGIM), Venezuelan agency in charge of Military Intelligence, was involved in supporting FARC drug trafficking.

==== Hezbollah and Iran ties ====
The Venezuelan government has allegedly had a long relationship with the Islamic militant group Hezbollah. In a 2011 article by The New York Times, Colonel Adel Mashmoushi, Lebanon's drug enforcement chief, stated that flights between Venezuela and Syria that were operated by Iran could have been used by Hezbollah to transport drugs into the Middle East. According to long-time serving New York district attorney Robert Morgenthau, high-ranking Venezuelan officials turned Venezuela to "a global cocaine hub" and his office had found that cocaine in New York was linked to Venezuela, Iran and Hezbollah. Morgenthau also explained how Hugo Chávez's government allegedly assisted Iran with drug trafficking so Iran could circumvent sanctions and fund their development of nuclear weapons and other armaments.

== International actions ==
The CIA, in spite of objections from the Drug Enforcement Administration, in 1990 allowed at least one ton of nearly pure cocaine to be shipped into Miami International Airport. The CIA claimed to have done this as a way of gathering information about Colombian drug cartels. But the cocaine ended up being sold on the street.

In November 2014, authorities from Brazil, Colombia, Honduras, and the United States dismantled an international drug trade and money laundering operation which was based in Brazil where aircraft had their ID codes modified and were then flown from areas in Venezuela controlled by FARC to Honduras where the aircraft were abandoned.

=== Indictment of Maduro and senior Venezuelan officials ===
US attorney general Pam Bondi's August 2025 announcement that the reward for Maduro's arrest has increased to $50 million

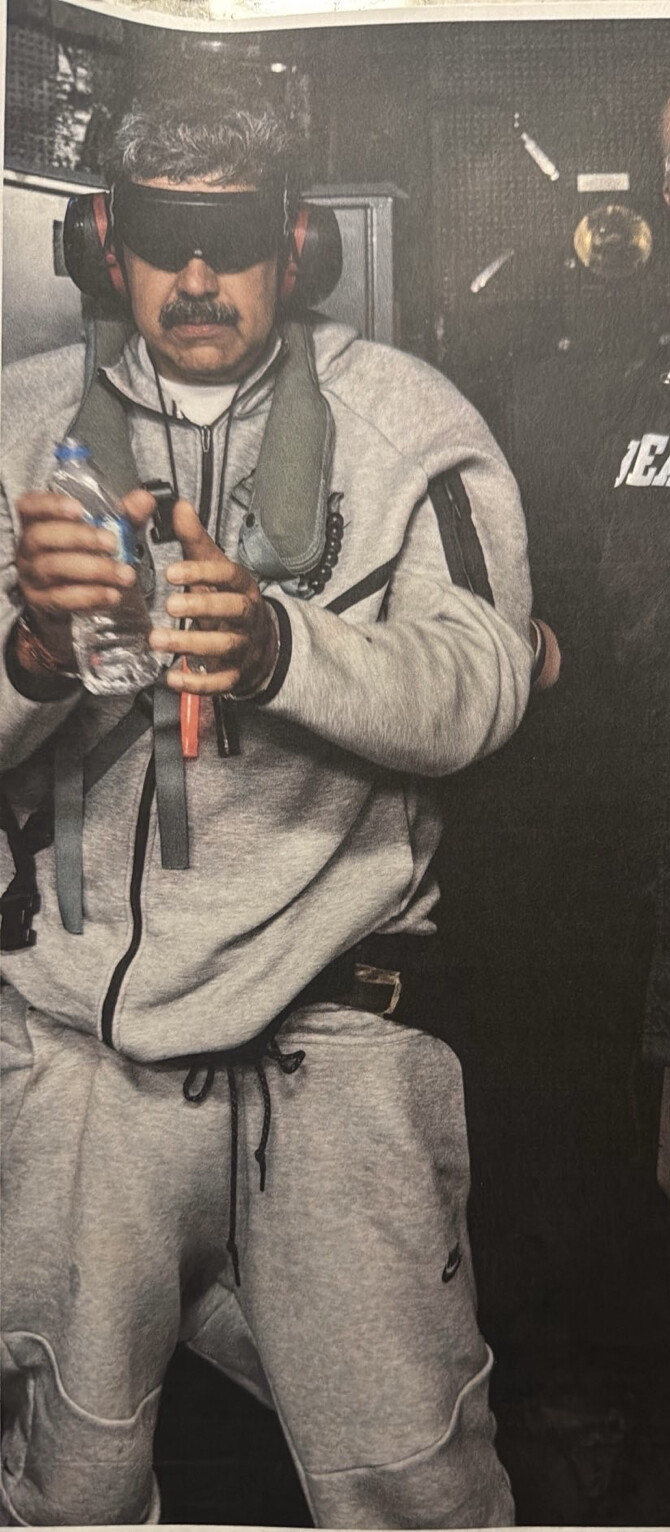
Venezuelan president Nicolás Maduro in custody of U.S. forces aboard the USS Iwo Jima, 3 January 2026

In March 2020, United States Attorney General William Barr described Venezuela under the Nicolás Maduro regime as a country plagued by criminality and corruption, and announced criminal charges against him, other Venezuelan officials, and some former Colombian FARC members for what he called "narco-terrorism." He accused Maduro and high-ranking Venezuelan officials of conspiring with the FARC to ship tons of cocaine into the US to wage a health war on American citizens. According to Barr, Venezuelan leaders and the FARC faction organised an "air bridge" from a Venezuelan air base transporting cocaine to Central America and a sea route to the Caribbean. Hours after the announcement, the Department of State offered $15 million for any information leading to the arrest of Maduro.

After Maduro was inaugurated for a third term on 10 January 2025, the US State Department announced that the reward against Maduro was increased from $15 million to $25 million. National Security Council spokesperson John Kirby said that the decision to raise the bounty as part of "a concerted message of solidarity with the Venezuelan people," meant "to further elevate international efforts to maintain pressure on Maduro and his representatives." Secretary of State Antony Blinken stated that the U.S. "does not recognize Nicolas Maduro as the president of Venezuela" and a US Treasury Under Secretary, Bradley Smith, added that the U.S. stood with its "likeminded partners" in "solidarity with the people's vote for new leadership and rejects Maduro's fraudulent claim of victory".

The reward was increased again to $50 million on 7 August 2025, with Attorney General Pam Bondi accusing Maduro of collaborating with foreign terrorist organizations, such as Tren de Aragua, the Sinaloa Cartel, and the Cartel of the Suns. Bondi described Maduro as one of the "world's most notorious narco-traffickers" and a "threat to national security," which prompted the reward to be doubled. She concluded, "Under President Trump's leadership, Maduro will not escape justice, and he will be held accountable for his despicable crimes," before providing the public with a hotline number to report tips to the Drug Enforcement Administration. In a Fox News interview, Bondi stated that the DOJ had seized approximately $700 million in assets linked to Maduro. The assets allegedly included multiple luxury homes in Florida, a mansion in the Dominican Republic, private jets, vehicles, a horse farm, jewelry, and large sums of cash. She described Maduro's government as an "organized crime operation" that continued to function despite the seizures.

Increasing Maduro's bounty led to some mockery of Bondi and the Trump administration on social media, with the phrase "He's in Venezuela" trending on Twitter. Some users claimed the move was merely a distraction from the concurrent controversy surrounding the Jeffrey Epstein client list. Venezuelan officials, such as foreign minister Yván Gil and Vice President Delcy Rodríguez, also framed it as a distraction from the Jeffrey Epstein controversy, while dismissing the announcement as a "crude political propaganda operation" and a "ridiculous and cheap show", respectively. Maduro, for his part, dared Trump to arrest him during a nationally televised speech and warned US leadership that attempting to do so would provoke a response that could also lead to the end of the American empire.

On 3 January 2026, U.S. special operations forces raided Caracas and captured Maduro and his wife Cilia Flores at their compound. Per anonymous U.S. sources, a Venezuelan source was used by the CIA to track Maduro's whereabouts, and the bounty was a clear aid in receiving reward. Maduro and Flores were transported to the United States and taken into federal custody in New York City. He is currently detained at the Metropolitan Detention Center in Brooklyn. Maduro and Flores pleaded not guilty to their charges.

== Statistics ==
According to The New York Times, claims presented by the Venezuelan government "appear to be vastly overstated". In 2009, a report from the United States Congress said that from 2004 to 2007, the quantity of cocaine exported from Colombia via Venezuela had quadrupled, reaching 17% of world trade in cocaine in 2007. The smuggling of cocaine has increased in Venezuela in the 2010s, going from about 25% of South American cocaine coming from the country in 2010 to about 33% in 2015.

== See also ==
- Crime in Venezuela
- National Anti-Drug Office
