= Murder of Kluivert Roa =

2015 protest related death in Venezuela

- Location: Barrio Obrero of San Cristóbal, Venezuela
- Date: 24 February 2015
- Attack type: Murder by shooting, police brutality
- Charges: Murder
- Verdict: Guilty
- Sentence: 18 years
- Convicted: Javier Osías Mora

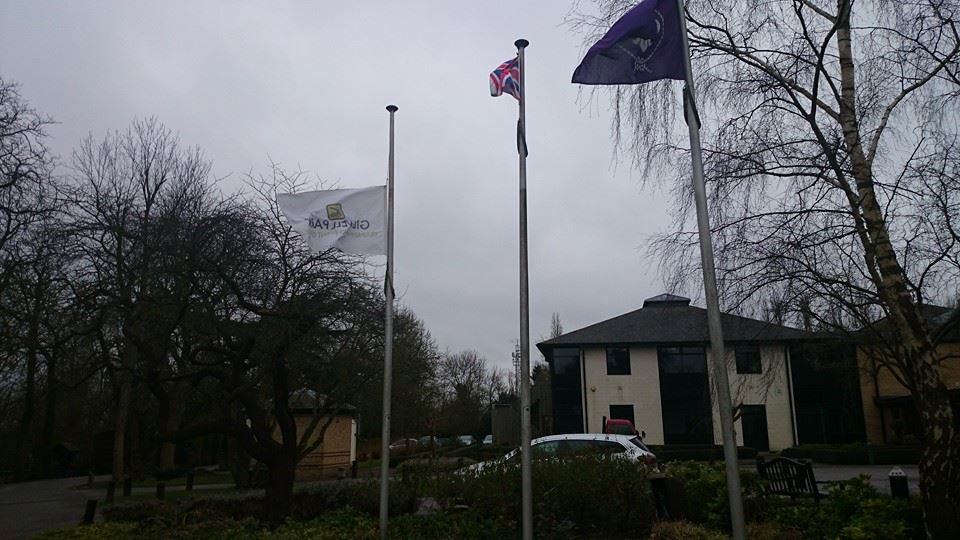
Gilwall Park

Kluivert Ferney Roa Núñez (November 3, 2000 – February 24, 2015) was a Venezuelan high school student who was killed during a protest against Venezuelan President Nicolás Maduro by an officer from the Policía Nacional Bolivariana. The event shocked Venezuela.

== Biography ==
Roa was born in San Cristóbal, in the Andean state of Táchira. He was a high school student at the Instituto Agustín Codazzi.

== Death ==
On February 24, 2015, at the Barrio Obrero of San Cristóbal, during a student protest against Venezuelan President Nicolás Maduro, Roa was shot by Javier Osías Mora, an officer of the Policía Nacional Bolivariana. The bullet struck Roa in the head at the top of his skull. He was immediately sent to the San Cristóbal Central Hospital, but died on the way to the hospital.

The official time of this event was given to the authorities, who designated the case.

== Investigation and sentencing ==
The officer, Javier Mora Ortiz, admitted to the killing shortly after he was arrested. On 9 May 2015, Ortiz was sentenced to 18 years in jail, with the court ruling that he was guilty of murder.
