= Law enforcement in Venezuela =

Law enforcement in Venezuela is highly fragmented, being split across multiple police agencies of various types.

The National Guard, with around 33,000 officers, is attached to the Ministry of Defence. The Cuerpo de Investigaciones Científicas, Penales y Criminalísticas, with around 8,000 officers, is the primary criminal investigation agency. The Policía Nacional Bolivariana, created in 2009, had 2,400 officers in July 2010 (with a further 1,400 in training).

In addition, each of Venezuela's 23 states has its own police force, numbering around 50,000 officers altogether. Finally, since 1989's decentralization legislation, many municipalities have set up their own police forces. Both state and municipal/city police forces report to the Federal Ministry of Interior, Justice and Peace through their respective state governments.

== History ==
=== 1958-1998 ===
In 1958, Venezuela overthrew the dictator Marcos Pérez Jiménez, but for much of the 1958-1998 period the criminal justice and law enforcement system established under Jiménez and the earlier dictator Juan Vicente Gómez was not substantially reformed, and "the criminal justice system remained a blemish on this image of democracy". A small 1987 survey found that 74% of prisoners said that the police tortured them. The police relied heavily on obtaining confession evidence, and for poor defendants a lack of effective defence lawyers "led to frequent convictions of innocent people".

Other aspects of the justice system conspired to make this worse: "Venezuelan criminal procedure crushed poor and uneducated defendants in its Kafkaesque gears." Prisons were extremely violent, with a high probability of death or rape; and about 70% of prisoners were awaiting a judge's decision. After some years of public pressure, 1998 saw the drafting of a radically reformed criminal law, which came into effect in July 1999.

=== 2006 CONAREPOL ===
In 2006, a National Commission on Police Reform (CONAREPOL, from the Spanish name) conducted studies aimed at reforming the police, in consultation with police and local communities. It found that

"Careful study of the different police agencies makes it evident that many do not have adequate infrastructure, and they are lacking in basic services or the spaces that are necessary for police activities (e.g., holding cells). In other cases, they do not even have their own building. Higher level technological resources (phones, fax, internet connection, computers, software) are relatively rare or, if present, are found only at central headquarters. Lack of, or deficiencies in, infrastructure are most marked for the municipal police.… [T]he majority of [all] police agencies are unable to assign a firearm to each officer on duty; neither are there sufficient handcuffs or bullet-proof vests. Some agencies have only one firearm for the whole force."

In general, the Commission found, "bureaucracy is weakly developed: three-quarters of state and municipal forces do not have a manual for procedures and two-thirds lack an organizational manual".

The recommendations given by the CONAREPOL have resulted in the 2009 establishment of the Policia Nacional Bolivariana by the passing of two required laws for its establishment by the National Assembly, thus making it the youngest ever national police force to be established in Latin America.

== Secret police organizations ==
- Bolivarian Intelligence Service (SEBIN)
- Dirección de Inteligencia Militar (DIM)

== See also ==
- Crime in Venezuela
