= Experimental Security University =

University in Venezuela

- Universidad Nacional Experimental de la Seguridad
- Type: Public
- Established: 2009
- Location: Caracas, Venezuela
- Website: unes.edu.ve

The Experimental Security University (UNES, Universidad Nacional Experimental de la Seguridad) is a state university in Venezuela founded in 2009. It specialises in providing training for Venezuelan police and security forces, in particular the new Policía Nacional Bolivariana.
