= Bolivarian National Police =

National police agency of Venezuela

Bolivarian National Police Policía Nacional Bolivariana
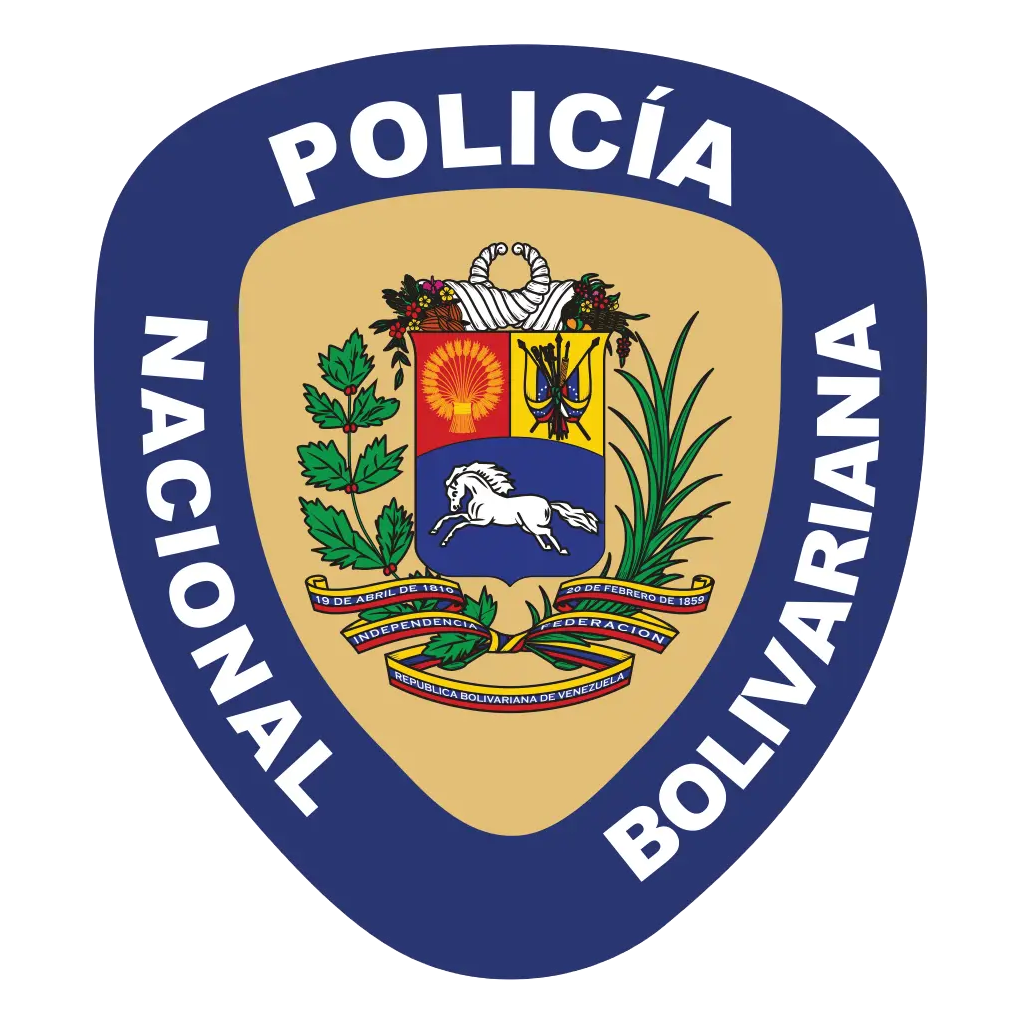
- Abbreviation: PNB

Jurisdictional structure
- National agency: VEN
- Operations jurisdiction: VEN
- General nature: Civilian police

Operational structure
- Headquarters: Caracas

The Bolivarian National Police (Spanish: Policía Nacional Bolivariana, PNB) is Venezuela's national police force, created in 2009. Law enforcement in Venezuela has historically been highly fragmented, and the creation of a national police force was originally unpopular among the public and organizations. The creation of a National Police was one of the recommendations of a 2006 National Commission on Police Reform (CONAREPOL). At the time that the force was set up, the wage rate for officers in the new force was three times higher than that in existing forces.

As of July 2010, the PNB had around 2,400 officers, with a further 1,400 in training. Now it has grown into an estimated 20,000-strong national police force.

== Background ==
In 2001, the Venezuelan National Assembly gave the government one year to create a national police force. President Hugo Chávez then attempted to create a centralized national police force, announcing his plans in August 2002. However, the Venezuelan public, academics, NGOs and municipal governments rejected the idea with Alfredo Peña stating that the police would possibly be used to repress protesters, resulting with the Venezuelan government canceling the creation of a national police force.

In 2006 a National Commission on Police Reform (CONAREPOL, from the Spanish name) conducted studies aimed at reforming the police, in consultation with police and local communities. It found that

"Careful study of the different police agencies makes it evident that many do not have adequate infrastructure, and they are lacking in basic services or the spaces that are necessary for police activities (e.g., holding cells). In other cases, they do not even have their own building. Higher level technological resources (phones, fax, internet connection, computers, software) are relatively rare or, if present, are found only at central headquarters. Lack of, or deficiencies in, infrastructure are most marked for the municipal police.… [T]he majority of [all] police agencies are unable to assign a firearm to each officer on duty; neither are there sufficient handcuffs or bullet-proof vests. Some agencies have only one firearm for the whole force."

In general, the Commission found, "bureaucracy is weakly developed: three-quarters of state and municipal forces do not have a manual for procedures and two-thirds lack an organizational manual".

In November 2008 a Commission for the Police System (Comsipol) was created to implement CONAREPOL's recommendations. These included the creation of a National Police, which was done in 2009. Other recommendations were that the police should be specifically trained in human rights, and have a greater emphasis on crime prevention. The Experimental Security University was set up to provide such training with branches in various Venezuelan cities.

On 7 December 2009, the Bolivarian National Police was officially raised with the full enactment of the Police Service Organic Law of 2009 and the Police Service Statutes Law, published on the Official Gazette on the same day. These laws formally marked the founding of what is now South America's youngest national police force, which took place formally on December 20 the same year.

== Special Actions Force ==
The Special Actions Force of the Bolivarian National Police (Spanish: Fuerza de Acción Especial de la Policía Nacional Bolivariana, FAES) was created by President Nicolás Maduro to "combat crime and terrorism" in 2017. It has around 1,300 officers and includes the Unidad de Operaciones Tácticas Especiales (UOTE) a police tactical unit. It was accused by PROVEA, a Venezuelan human rights group, of having killed more than 100 people in low-income neighborhoods in the six months leading up to January 2019 during the protests in Venezuela. On 5 July 2019 the UN High Commissioner for Human Rights, Michelle Bachelet, released a report presenting evidence of the murdering of at least 6,800 Venezuelans from January 2018 to May 2019 by various security forces including the FAES. The report included documentation of instances of torture, including waterboarding and electric shocks. The regime deemed it as "biased". The PNB originally formed a police tactical unit in 2011.

== Functions ==
While Article 34 of the Police Organic Law states the similarities of the National Police with the state, municipal, city and township police forces and the Venezuelan National Guard, Article 39 of the said law states the following services to be rendered only by personnel of the National Police:

- Customs policing, penal establishment protection, environmental, maritime and migration protection, transport police services and border security
- Protection of state dignitaries and the diplomatic corps
- Partnerships with international police agencies and compliance with international laws ratified by the Venezuelan government
- Raising tactical groups with their respective regulations
- Full compliance with judicial order, laws and regulations passed by the National Assembly

== Arbitrary arrests, torture, and enforced disappearances ==
Between 2017 and 2022, Venezuela recorded 2,033 victims of alleged extrajudicial executions, leaving at least 1,520 children and adolescents orphaned, according to the Victims Monitor. This report documents how the Bolivarian National Police (PNB) has been a central actor in these events, with multiple incidents in which security forces—particularly the Special Actions Forces (FAES)—were responsible for numerous deaths. Jennifer Blanco, a 14‑year‑old teenager, is one of the many children affected by police lethality. Her father, Amilcar Blanco, was allegedly executed by the FAES after participating in protests against the government in 2019, leaving Jennifer and her four siblings orphaned. The Victims Monitor, in collaboration with the Consortium for Supporting Independent Journalism in the Region (CAPIR), carried out an investigation that brought to light the stories of 26 orphans in five Venezuelan states: Caracas, Lara, Táchira, Zulia, and Sucre. The data collected show that in Caracas alone, 1,328 children and adolescents were orphaned due to deaths from alleged extrajudicial executions or resistance to authority between 2017 and 2022. In Lara, these causes orphaned 143 minors between 2020 and 2022; in Táchira, 14 between 2021 and 2022; in Zulia, 27 in 2022 alone; and in Sucre, 17 in the same year. The investigation highlights serious psychological consequences, such as night terrors, as well as economic, educational, and emotional deprivations faced by these children.

According to a report by the NGO Lupa por la Vida, in 2022 the Bolivarian National Police (PNB) was the security agency responsible for the most deaths in Venezuela, with 196 fatal victims—representing 24% of the total deaths attributed to state security forces. In total, police and military personnel murdered 824 people in alleged extrajudicial executions. Of these, only 501 victims were identified, while 323 remain unidentified. In addition to the PNB, another 36 deaths were caused by the Directorate Against Organized Crime (DCDO) and 2 by the now-defunct Special Actions Force (FAES). State police recorded 193 victims, the Scientific, Criminal and Forensic Investigations Corps (CICPC) 142, the Bolivarian National Armed Forces (FANB) 126, and municipal police 45. Marino Alvarado, a lawyer and head of investigations at Lupa por la Vida, noted that although some special operations divisions of the PNB and the FAES were disbanded, this did not reduce police lethality, pointing to a "recycling" of FAES officers into other units such as the DCDO and the Criminal Investigation Directorate (DIP). The report also indicated that deaths of protesters at the hands of security forces were significantly reduced in 2022—the first year since 2013 in which no fatalities were recorded during protests. However, Alvarado underscored the persistence of impunity and the lack of investigations into murders committed by police and military personnel, criticizing the Venezuelan state's failure to comply with its commitments to the International Criminal Court. The states with the highest incidences of police violence were Carabobo, Zulia, Aragua, Yaracuy, and Portuguesa, with specific municipalities such as Sucre and Lander in Miranda, and Valencia in Carabobo being particularly affected.

The Bolivarian National Police (PNB) of Venezuela has been the subject of numerous allegations of abuses and human rights violations, continuing practices previously attributed to the disbanded Special Actions Forces (FAES). The new units of the PNB, such as the Directorate of Strategic and Tactical Actions (DAET), the Criminal Investigation Directorate (DIP), and the Directorate Against Organized Crime (DCDO), have been cited for arbitrary arrests, torture, enforced disappearances, and extrajudicial executions. A notable case is that of John Álvarez, a university student who reported being tortured by PNB agents after being detained on charges of conspiracy. His mother, Wenderlin Peña, stated that Álvarez suffered electric shocks and beatings, resulting in partial vision loss and injuries to his kidney and leg. The allegations of torture and police brutality occur in a context of selective repression by the government of Nicolás Maduro, according to reports by the United Nations, which documented multiple cases of human rights violations between 2020 and 2023. Despite the dissolution of the FAES and the reassignment of its members to other units, activists such as Marino Alvarado from the NGO PROVEA argue that abusive practices persist. The situation has generated an international response, with the United Nations demanding reforms and the International Criminal Court investigating possible crimes against humanity. The Venezuelan government, for its part, defends the actions of its security forces and claims that it has sanctioned more than 500 officials for human rights violations since 2017.

On May 25, 2024, Eliécer Enrique Fuentes Mendoza, a 17‑year‑old teenager, was killed by a gunshot to the head in the Santa Ana sector of Carapita, Caracas. According to witnesses and family members, the perpetrators were officers of the Bolivarian National Police (PNB). Eliécer was with neighbors and friends—many on motorcycles—performing stunts in the street when they were ambushed by a unit of the PNB’s Division Against Gangs, attached to El Junquito. When they attempted to flee to avoid detention, the officers opened fire, treating them as criminals. One witness recounted that several ran while others dropped to the ground, but one of the shots struck Eliécer in the head. Following the incident, the community attempted to halt the assault by confronting the officers and demanding justice. The teenager was taken to Miguel Pérez Carreño Hospital, where he was pronounced dead. On February 2, 2024, four members of the motorized brigade of the Bolivarian National Police (PNB) in Trujillo State were arrested on homicide charges after allegedly staging an encounter that resulted in the death of two young people. The victims, Marlon Montilla, 22, and Yonaiker Ramírez, 21, were murdered on January 24 in Valera. The Scientific, Criminal and Forensic Investigations Corps (CICPC) revealed irregularities in the case, indicating that the police officers had staged an encounter. According to witnesses, the young men were intercepted by a PNB unit at the Bella Vista field and allegedly taken to the city command. They were later found dead inside a vehicle on a nearby public road. The official version from the implicated officers—that it was a genuine encounter—was refuted by CICPC investigations, and two additional officers remain at large. This case recalls an earlier incident in October 2023 in Charallave, Miranda State, where two municipal police officers were arrested for staging an encounter after murdering Héctor Luis Huerta, 27, during his arrest for stealing a mobile phone. Venezuelan law, under Article 239 of the Penal Code, punishes the staging of criminal acts with prison sentences—aggravated in cases of homicide—with penalties of up to 25 years in prison.

== Organization ==
The National Police is headed by, as of 2016, the Director General of the National Police, Police Chief Commissioner MGEN Juan Francisco Romero Figueroa.

Organização	Subunidades
National Command Directorate of the National Police	Deputy Directorate; Office of the National Police Secretariat General
National Police Offices for:	Police Complaints and Actions; Legal Services; Human Resources; Information Technology; Communications and Public Relations; Police Planning and Systems; Administration; Special Action Force; Victim attention and police operations
National Police Directorates	Operations and Special Tactics; Intelligence; Land and Transportation Investigation and Security; Aviation; Migration; Prisons Police
National Police Regional Commands (serving all 23 states of Venezuela through the State, Municipal and Township/City Police Forces and in coastal areas by the Maritime Command)	Western; Andes; Central; Plains; Guayana; Eastern and Insular; Capital (Greater Caracas)

=== Ranks ===
	Nivel Alta Direccion		Nivel Estratégico				Nivel Táctico			Nivel Operativo
Venezuelan National Police
Venezuelan National Police	Comisario Superior	Comisario Mayor	Comisario General	Comisario Jefe	Primer Comisario	Comisario	Inspector Jefe	Primer Inspector	Inspector	Oficial Jefe	Primer Oficial	Oficial

== See also ==
- Law enforcement in Venezuela
- Murder of Kluivert Roa

== Sources ==
- Birkbeck, Christopher (2009), "Venezuela: the shifting organizational framework for the police", Police Practice and Research, Volume 10, Issue 4 August 2009, pages 295–304
