= 2019 Venezuelan protests =

Protests starting in January 2019

- Part of 2014–present Venezuelan protests and the Venezuelan presidential crisis
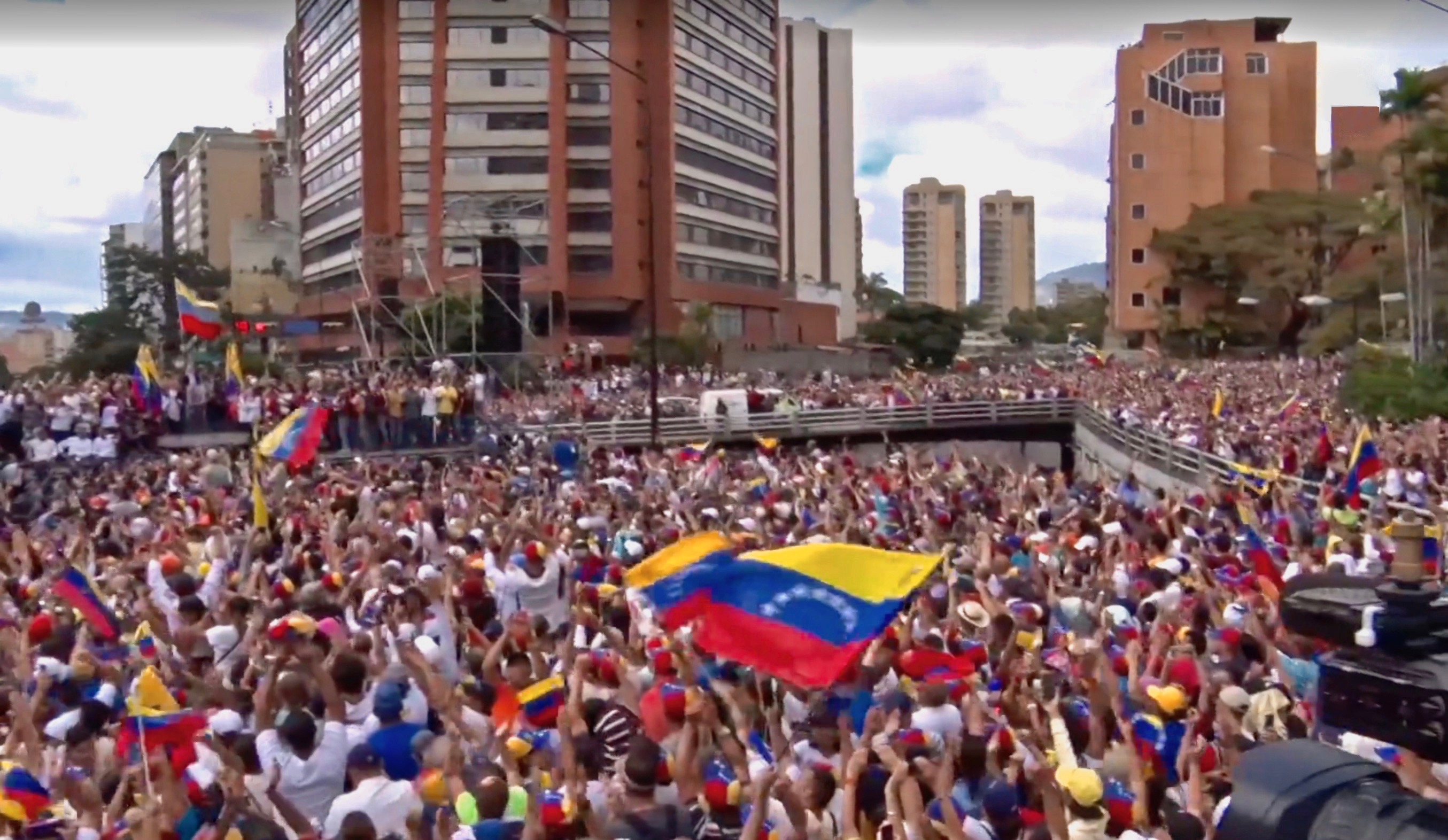
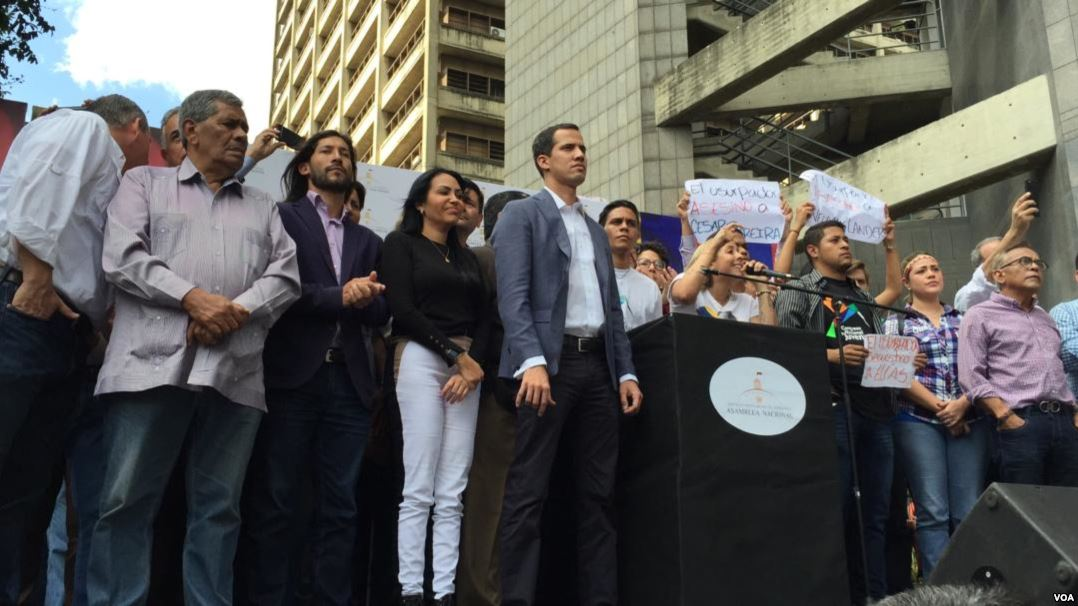
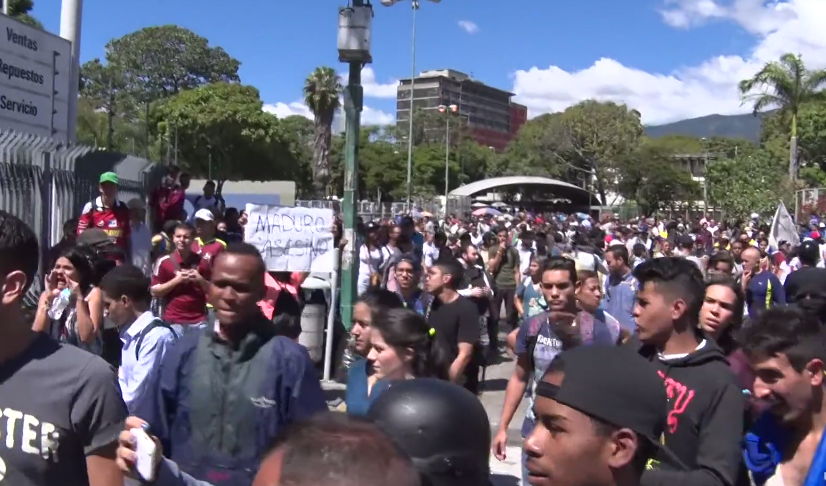
- Top to bottom, left to right: Protesters gathered in Caracas on 23 January. Juan Guaidó beside supporters during the first open cabildo. Protesters in Caracas during the second inauguration of Nicolás Maduro.
- Date: 10 January 2019 – 16 November 2019
- Location: Venezuela
- Caused by: Ongoing socioeconomic and political crisis; Venezuelan presidential crisis
- Goals: Resignation of Nicolas Maduro; Creation of a transitional government; Free and fair elections
- Result: Maduro remains in power >(Until 2026)

Parties
| (Venezuela) Opposition: Guaidó government; National Assembly; MUD; Supreme Tribunal in exile; Opposition protesters | (Venezuela) Government: Maduro government; Constituent Assembly; GPPSB; Supreme Tribunal; Colectivos (Pro-Maduro paramilitaries): La Piedrita; Tupamaros; Colombian Guerrillas: Revolutionary Armed Forces of Colombia; National Liberation Army; Maduro supporters |

Lead figures
| Juan Guaidó (Interim president of Venezuela) Prominent activists: (Venezuela) Juan Guaidó; (Venezuela) Leopoldo López; (Venezuela) Fabiana Rosales; (Venezuela) Luisa Ortega Díaz; (Venezuela) Rafaela Requesens; (Venezuela) Lilian Tintori; (Venezuela) Antonio Ledezma; (Venezuela) Diego Arria; (Venezuela) Henri Falcón | Nicolás Maduro (President of Venezuela) Others: (Venezuela) Delcy Rodríguez; (Venezuela) Vladimir Padrino López; (Venezuela) Diosdado Cabello; (Venezuela) Tareck El Aissami; (Venezuela) Néstor Reverol; (Venezuela) Cilia Flores; (Venezuela) Tarek William Saab; (Venezuela) Jorge Rodríguez |

Casualties
- Deaths: 107+ as of March 2019
- Injuries: 500+ as of February 2019
- Arrested: 956 (at least 77 children) as of February 2019

The 2019 Venezuelan protests were a collection of protests that were organized, since 11 January, as a coordinated effort to remove Nicolás Maduro from the presidency. Demonstrations began following Maduro's controversial second inauguration, developing into a presidential crisis between Maduro and National Assembly president Juan Guaidó. The protests also included counter-demonstrations organized by those who support Maduro.

The protests partially resumed early in 2020, but were suspended due to the arrival of COVID-19 to Venezuela.

== National protests ==
The Wall Street Journal reported in a March 2019 article entitled "Maduro loses grip on Venezuela's poor, a vital source of his power" that slums are turning against Maduro and that "many blame government brutality for the shift". Foro Penal said that 50 people—mostly in slums—had been killed by security forces in only the first two months of the year, and 653 had been arrested for protesting or speaking against the government.

There have also been rival demonstrations in support of the Bolivarian Revolution, Maduro's government and against foreign intervention.

Retired general Hugo Carvajal—the head of Venezuela's military intelligence for ten years during Hugo Chávez's presidency, who served as a National Assembly deputy for the United Socialist Party of Venezuela and was considered a pro-Maduro legislator, "one of the government's most prominent figures"—said that Maduro orders the so-called "spontaneous protests" in his favor abroad, and his partners finance them.

=== Nicolás Maduro's inauguration ===
Many Venezuelans did not support the inauguration of Maduro, and held protests across the nation and in the capital city, Caracas. Several cacerolazos were reported across Caracas, including near to where Maduro was being sworn in. Maduro supporters demonstrated separately. Before the inauguration, the opposition had called on the people to protest during the inauguration, with one protest co-hosted by students led by Rafaela Requesens and Guaidó's Popular Will party, blocking off a road near UCV.

=== Open cabildos ===
Treated as a form of peaceful protest, several open cabildos were held in January 2019. The first of these was on 11 January, held by Guaidó. In the streets of Caracas people gathered to support him.

=== January ===
In anticipation of the protests on 23 January, other violent protests occurred. On 21 January there was a small-scale attempted military mutiny seen as a failed coup. There were 27 soldiers who kidnapped security and stole weapons, trying to march on Miraflores, who fought with and were apprehended by authorities in the early hours. People in the local area continued the fight, protesting and burning things in the street even as tear gas was deployed. Colectivos killed a non-protesting woman in her own doorway, and five others were injured.

According to Venezuelan journalist Francisco Toro for The Washington Post, protests broke out in working-class Caracas neighbourhoods on January 22, which until then had supported Maduro. These resulted in the death of a 16-year-old boy by gunshot. Other protests happened in the large Bolívar state, where three people were killed and a statue of Hugo Chávez set alight and broken in half before the head and torso were hung like a trophy from a public bridge.

==== 23 January ====
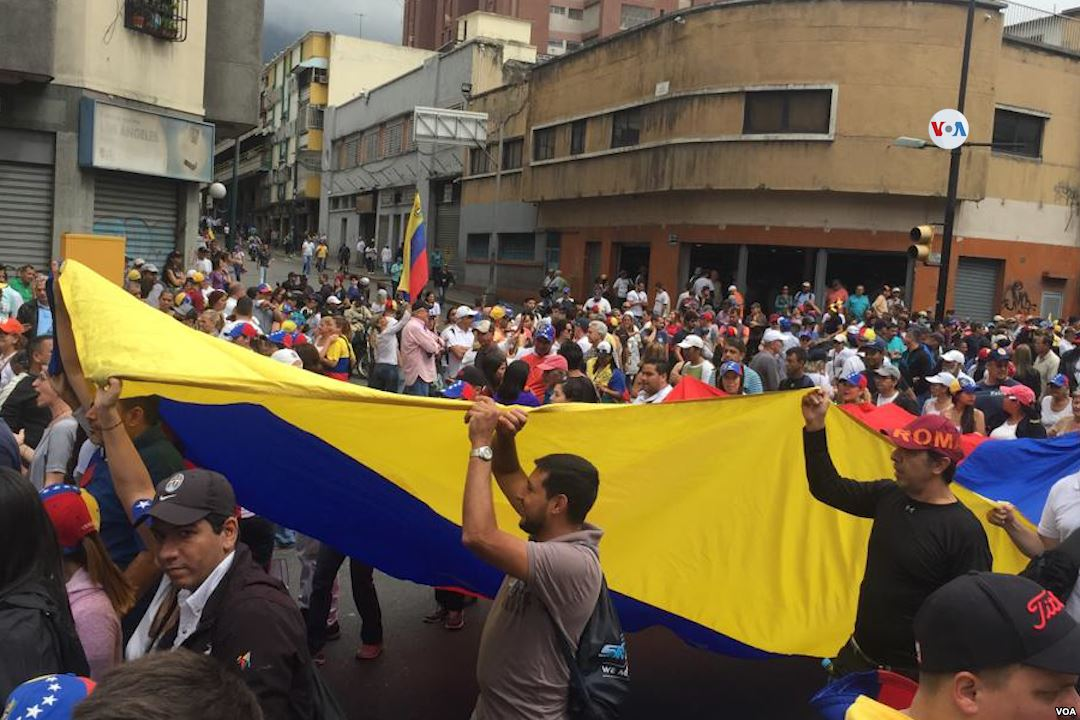
23 January 2019 protesters

Announced at the 11 January open cabildo, a series of protest marches drawing crowds which were reported by The Economist, The Wall Street Journal editorial board, and Yeshiva World News from hundreds of thousands to millions of Venezuelans, 23 January protests – on the anniversary of the 1958 Venezuelan coup d'état that overthrew dictator Marcos Pérez Jiménez – were the flagship event hoping to force Maduro to step down. United States Vice President Mike Pence sent a video of support to the nation on this day. Similarly, Juan Guaidó and his wife Fabiana Rosales sent separate videos to the military of Venezuela, asking for them to "not shoot at us".

Before the protest began, the Venezuelan National Guard used tear gas on gathering crowds at other locations. Another area of the capital was blocked off at Plaza Venezuela, a large main square, with armored vehicles and riot police on hand before protesters arrived. Photographic reports showed that some protests grew violent, resulting in injuries to both protesters and security. By the end of the day, at least 13 people were killed.

Cofavic interviewed witnesses who said that special forces killed five youths who had attended protests supporting the opposition.

During the evening hours, President of the Constituent Assembly Diosdado Cabello called on Maduro supporters to hold a vigil surrounding Miraflores Palace, though no one attended the event.

The Redes Foundation denounced in the Colombian Public Ministry that armed groups made up of National Liberation Army members and FARC dissidents, supported by the Bolivarian National Police and FAES officials, killed two Venezuelans, Eduardo José Marrero and Luigi Ángel Guerrero, during a protest in the frontier city of San Cristóbal, on Táchira state. Other protesters were injured during the shooting.

A few days later, Michelle Bachelet of the United Nations expressed concern that the violence during the protests could spiral out of control, and requested a UN investigation into the security forces' use of violence.

=== February ===
External images
- Satellite images of a Guaidó rally on 2 February 2019, 11:05 AM VET
- Satellite images of a Maduro rally on 2 February 2019, 11:05 AM VET

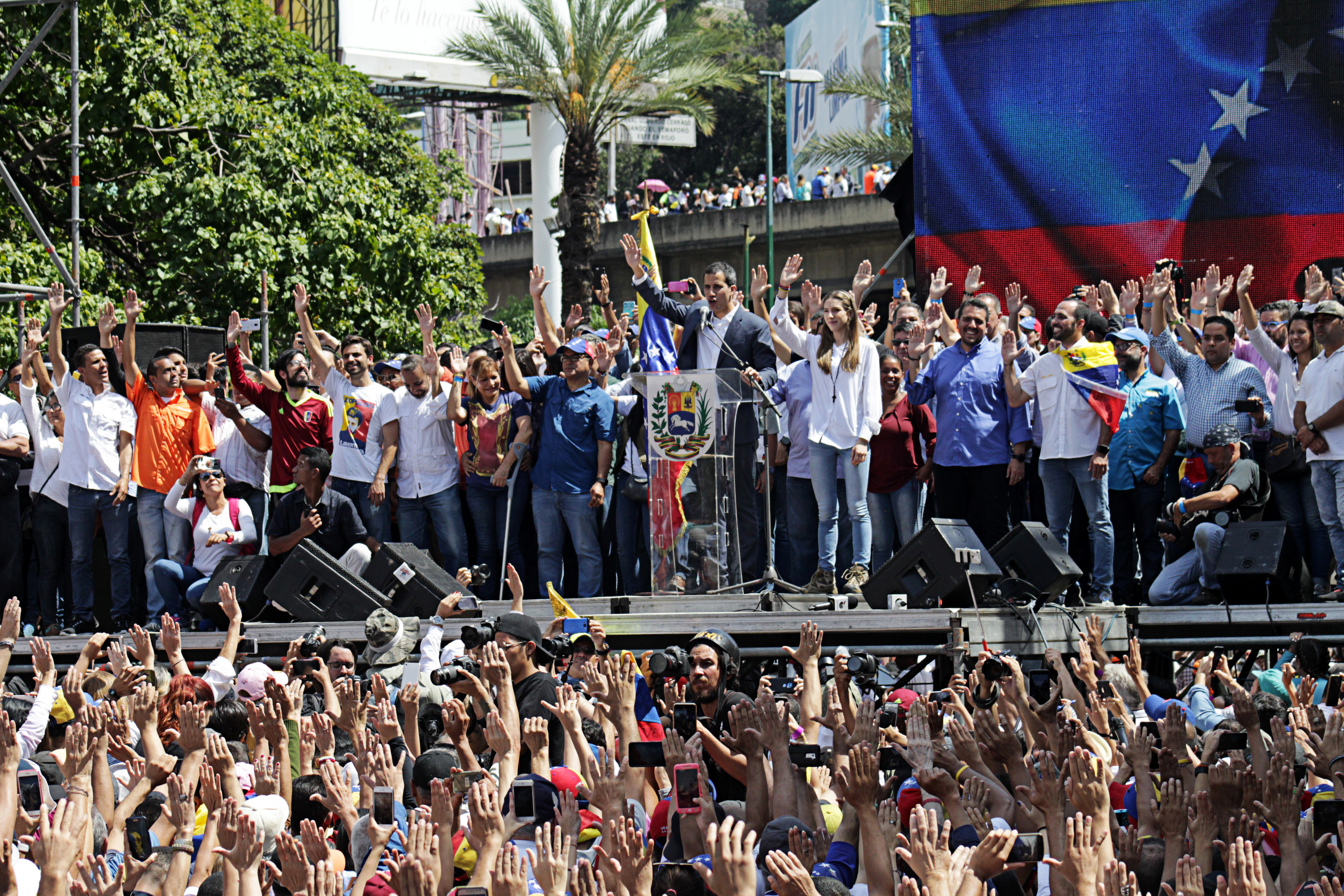
Guaidó at a 2 February demonstration

On 2 February opposition demonstrations filled the Las Mercedes Avenue in Caracas. The theme of the protests was to demand the entry of humanitarian aid into Venezuela, with hundreds of thousands of Venezuelans participating to show support for Guaidó. According to La Patilla, which provided satellite images, Maduro supporters participated in smaller counter-demonstrations on the same day at the same time.

At least 285 were injured and 14 were killed in the clashes on 23 February 2019.

=== March–April ===
Guaidó "took to the streets" to question Maduro's governance during the first two days of a nationwide blackout. According to The New York Times, "Maduro did not address the nation and his public silence has fed the tension gripping Caracas".

Protests against Maduro in Caracas and other cities were called for 9 March, and went on despite the closure of the Caracas Metro and the lack of social media. The rally headed by Guaidó, took place near the presidential palace in Miraflores; The Washington Post labeled the manifestation as "unusual" as it was held in a sector usually associated with Maduro supporters. Heavy police presence blocked the streets with anti-riot shields.

==== Call for Operation Freedom ====
Guaidó announced on 16 March that he would embark on a tour of the country to organize committees for what he called "Operation Freedom" (Spanish: Operación Libertad) with the goal to claim the presidential residence, Miraflores Palace. From the first rally in Carabobo state, he said, "We will be in each state of Venezuela and for each state we have visited the responsibility will be yours, the leaders, the united, [to] organize ourselves in freedom commands."

During the second wave of nationwide blackouts, Guaidó summoned new protests that would precede a decisive massive rally through Caracas. According to Guaidó, the goal of the protests is to increase political pressure, but rehearsals are needed as the operation cannot be organized "from one day to the next". Thousands of Venezuelans participated in a rally on 30 March, against the recurring blackouts. Guaidó toured around Miranda state and Caracas giving several speeches. Anti-riot police used tear gas against several opposition groups in areas where the Maduro supporters were active. Cacerolazos were reported in Caracas after blackouts resumed on Saturday night. The next day, protests against the lack of electricity and water occurred in Caracas and other cities. Some of the protests occurred close to the presidential palace. Maduro called again on the colectivos, asking them to "to defend the peace of every barrio, of every block". Videos circulated on social media showing colectivos threatening protesters and shooting in the streets; two protesters were shot. On Sunday night, police fired at protesters after they set burning barricades.

On 6 April, rallies were called by Juan Guaidó in more than 300 points around the country. Tens of thousands of Venezuelans denounced the lack of electricity and protested against Maduro's presidency, who they hold responsible for the economic crisis. Guaidó met the protesters at the main rally in El Marqués district of Caracas. In Maracaibo, the second largest city of Venezuela, protests were dispersed by police forces with tear gas and rubber bullets. El Nacional reported how tear gas was thrown from helicopters. Two lawmakers were also briefly detained in Maracaibo.

The same day, Maduro called a rival march. Thousands of protesters, mostly state workers, met at the center of Caracas. Maduro called for "understanding [that] we are in a true electrical emergency, a true national emergency."

In a public speech on 19 April in Caracas, Guaidó called for a "definite end of the usurpation" and the "largest march in history" on 1 May.

Guaidó continued to rally around the country for support. Armed forces and Maduro supporters have sometimes used roadblocks to avoid Guaidó's arrival to other cities. On 27 April, Guaidó had to cancel a rally in Barquisimeto because he was unable to get there.

==== 30 April ====
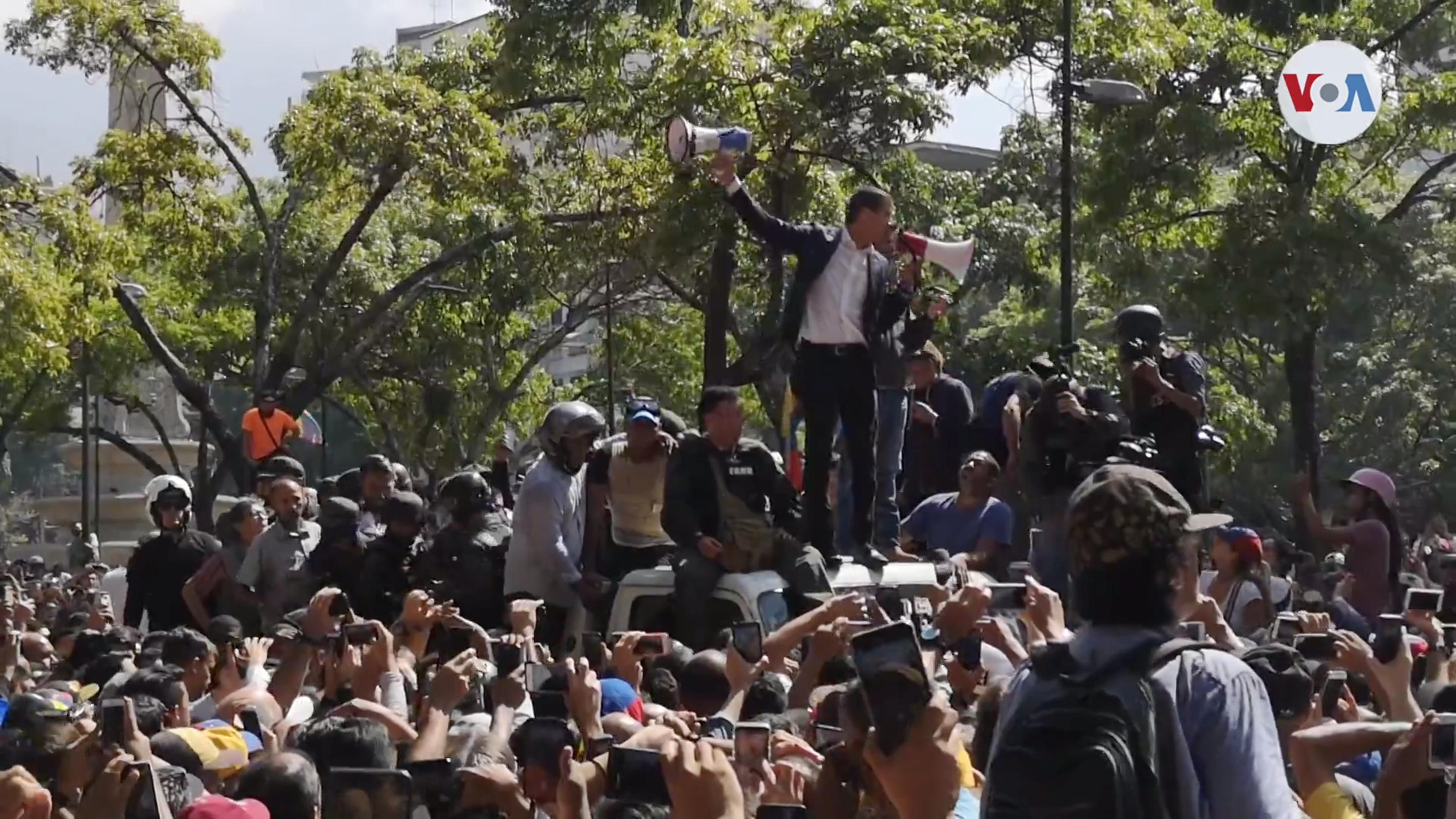
Guaidó speaking to supporters on 30 April 2019

On 30 April 2019, Leopoldo López—held under house arrest by the Maduro administration—was freed on orders from Guaidó. The two men, flanked by members of the Venezuelan armed forces near La Carlota Air Force Base in Caracas, announced an uprising, stating that this was the final phase of Operation Freedom. Guaidó said: "People of Venezuela, it is necessary that we go out together to the street, to support the democratic forces and to recover our freedom. Organized and together, mobilize the main military units. People of Caracas, all to La Carlota".

Maduro was not seen during the day, but he appeared with his Defense Minister Vladimir Padrino López on that evening's televised broadcast, and announced he would replace Manuel Ricardo Cristopher Figuera, the Director General of Venezuela's National Intelligence Service, SEBIN, who had broken with Maduro during the uprising.

By the end of the day, one protester had died, and López was at the Spanish embassy, while 25 military personnel sought asylum in the Brazilian embassy in Caracas. CNN reported that the "uprising faltered, having apparently failed to gain the support of senior members of the Venezuelan military".

=== May ===
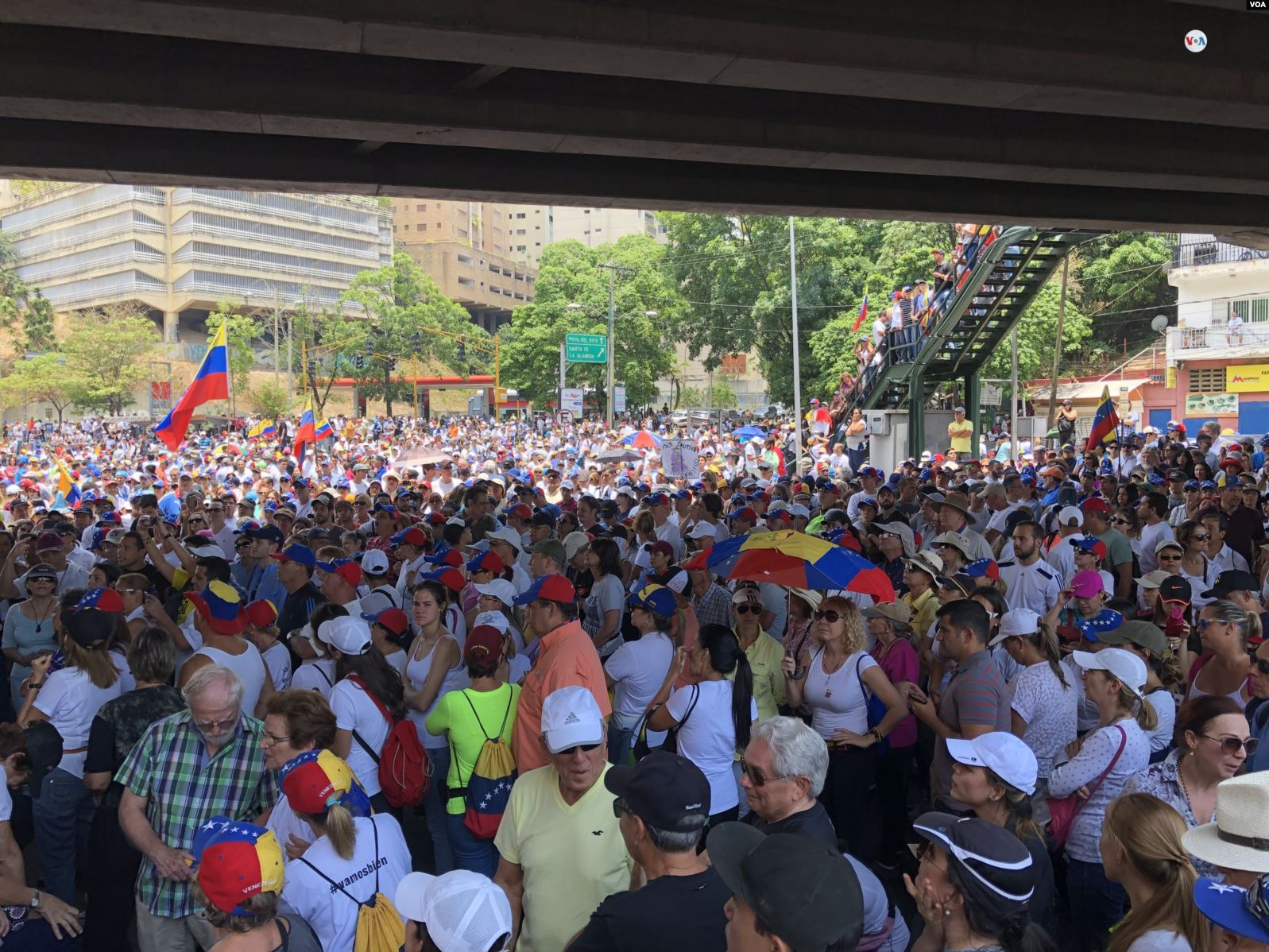
Protest of 1 May

Thousands to tens of thousands of supporters showed up for demonstrations on 1 May for Guaidó. (Note: The Guardian says tens of thousands; The Washington Post and The New York Times say thousands.) Guaidó's call for the largest march in history did not materialize and his supporters were forced to retreat by security forces using tear gas. Colectivos fired on protesters with live ammunition, and one protester was shot in the head and killed. Human Rights Watch "said it believed that security forces fired shotgun pellets at demonstrators and journalists". Guaidó acknowledged he had received insufficient military backing, but added that "Maduro did not have the support nor the respect of the Armed Forces", and called for strikes beginning on 2 May, with the aim of a general strike later in the month.

In the pro-Maduro counter rally, most supporters were from the public sector and many were brought from the interior of the country by bus. The Washington Post reported about 500 supporters, while The New York Times reported "thousands".

As of 2 May, there were 230 wounded in the protests, 205 arrests, and four dead. The Supreme Tribunal of Justice issued an arrest warrant for López on 2 May, who exited the gates of the Spanish Embassy, to speak with reporters, saying that Maduro's days are numbered. Maduro appeared at an army base to praise the loyalty of the forces.

On 4 May, Guaidó organized a peaceful march that was aimed to encourage more FANB defectors. The opposition leader later acknowledged that this march (including previous protests) did not have a sufficient outcome, and that he had "overestimated military support". During an interview with The Washington Post, Guaidó stated that he would consider a U.S. military intervention should the time arise.

On 11 May, Guaidó organized another march in Caracas, with a turnout of around a thousand Venezuelans. During the rally, Guaidó asked his ambassador appointed to the United States, Carlos Vecchio, to start a dialog with the US Southern Command.

The Venezuelan Observatory of Social Conflict (OVCS - Spanish: Observatorio Venezolano de Conflictividad Social), registered 1541 protests in the country during the month of May. As of June, OCVS and Provea have registered 60 protesters killed in rallies in the last five months.

=== June–July ===
Hundreds protested in front of the United Nations office in Caracas during the 22 June, the last day of the visit of the Office of the United Nations High Commissioner for Human Rights (OHCHR) chief, Michelle Bachelet. Mostly denouncing the human rights abuses carried out by Maduro administration, including extrajudicial killings, political arrests and detained journalists. Gilber Caro–a National Assembly member who was arrested in April and was released two days before the visit–joined the crowd. Protesters invited Bachelet to visit Maracaibo, a city that has collapsed under constant blackouts, fuel shortages and problems with security and health services. One of the chants during the protests included "Maduro is Pinochet", referring to Chilean dictator Augusto Pinochet, who jailed and tortured Bachelet and members of her family, killing her father. Some protesters held signs calling for the release of Juan Requesens, arrested in August 2018.

After three months of cooking gas shortages in La Fría, Táchira, a local protest broke out on 2 July. According to witnesses, officers fired at the crowd without warning. The 16-year-old Rufo Chacón, a bystander, was permanently blinded after being hit by over 52 buckshot pellets to his face at point blank range. Two police officers were investigated for injuring Chacón and attacking other protesters.

Guaidó called for nationwide protests to challenge Maduro's military parade on the Fifth of July, the independence day of Venezuela. A few thousands joined the rally in Caracas and marched to the DGCIM headquarters where days later a navy captain Rafael Acosta Arévalo was tortured to death. According to Guaidó's team, security forces were present on 15% of the 89 anti-Maduro demonstrations. No clashes were reported. Students, family and members of the clergy were present.

The president of the 2017 Constituent National Assembly, Diosdado Cabello, held a rally in Caracas in opposition to the OCHR report. His supporters describe the report is inaccurate and biased.

A small demonstration was carried out in front of the UN office in Caracas on 15 July, to protest against the DGCIM for their torture against detainees.

=== November ===
In November, Guaidó called for the return of the protests. On 16 November, nationwide rallies were carried out with a turnout of thousands of supporters in Caracas and in Maracaibo. (Note: Associated Press says about 2000 people gathered in Maracaibo) "Today, tomorrow and Monday — we will be in the streets", said Guaidó in his speech in the Altamira district in Caracas, mentioning the 18 days of protests that prompted Bolivian president Evo Morales to resign during 2019 Bolivian political crisis. Guaidó guided his supporters to the Bolivian embassy. The rallies were peaceful, anti-riot security forces covered the perimeter without throwing any tear gas canisters. According to reports, protest participation had a low turnout compared to earlier in the year.

The Maduro administration organized a counter-protest in the center of Caracas in solidarity with Evo Morales. Thousands of Morales's Venezuelan supporters wearing red shirts arrived in buses. Maduro did not participate and only addressed the crowd through state TV.

=== December ===
In a December poll by Venezuelan pollster Meganalisis, those surveyed were asked if they would go to the streets if Guaidó or the National Assembly called for protests. According to respondents, 84.8% would not protest, 10.9% would protest and 4.2% were unsure if they would protest.

== Abroad ==
During the presidential crisis, the United States government ended diplomatic relations with the Nicolás Maduro administration and recognized Juan Guaidó as the acting president of Venezuela. On 10 April, after the Maduro administration retired his diplomats from the embassy of Venezuela in Washington, activists from Code Pink, a US anti-war group, received keycards from the diplomats and moved into the building. The group secured all entrances with chains and locks. Carlos Vecchio, Guaidó's ambassador appointed to the US, tried to gain access to the building. The US government considers the embassy as property of Guaidó's interim government. For several days, pro-Guaidó protesters gathered outside the building trying to prevent the US activists from continuing to occupy the building. Clashes in May 2019 between US activists of the group and Venezuelan demonstrators resulted in arrests on both sides. US authorities issued an eviction notice on the group on May 14. The four remaining activists were removed from the embassy by US authorities on 16 May.

At the end of July 2019, some members of Code Pink that occupied the embassy visited Venezuela during the Foro de São Paulo. Maduro posed for pictures with the group and rewarded them with gifts, including a book on Simón Bolívar and a replica of Bolivar's sword.

== See also ==
- Protests against Nicolás Maduro
- La Salida
- 2014 Venezuelan protests
- 2017 Venezuelan protests
- 2019–2020 Hong Kong protests
- List of protests in the 21st century
