= La Piedrita =

Venezuelan paramilitary organization

- Dates active: September 1985–present
- Country: Venezuela
- Active regions: 23 de Enero, Caracas Metropolitan District
- Ideology: Bolivarianism; Chavismo
- Political position: Far-left
- Wars: crisis in Venezuela

La Piedrita is a colectivo that is active in Venezuela. It has been described as one of the most violent and influential colectivos in Venezuela. The colectivo has stated that they will defend the Bolivarian revolution "at all costs".

== History ==
=== Founding ===
La Piedrita was founded in September 1985 by Carlos Ramírez and Valentín Santana. The colectivo was founded to combat violence in the 23 de Enero neighborhood, with many of Santana's family members joining in the following years.

=== Bolivarian Venezuela ===
La Piedrita was formally organized when Bolivarian Circles were being established in Venezuela and since then, it has been described as a colectivo that is one of "the most violent in the country".

Lina Ron also headed the colectivo, who at the time of her leadership stated that thousands of Bolivarian Circles, such as her own, were "armed to the teeth". Ron allegedly had made connections with Diosdado Cabello as early as 2002, with Cabello reportedly being the key supporter of Ron. Also, Cabello had supposedly mediated between the colectivos of La Piedrita and the Tupamaros when they had a conflict in 2010.

== Activities ==
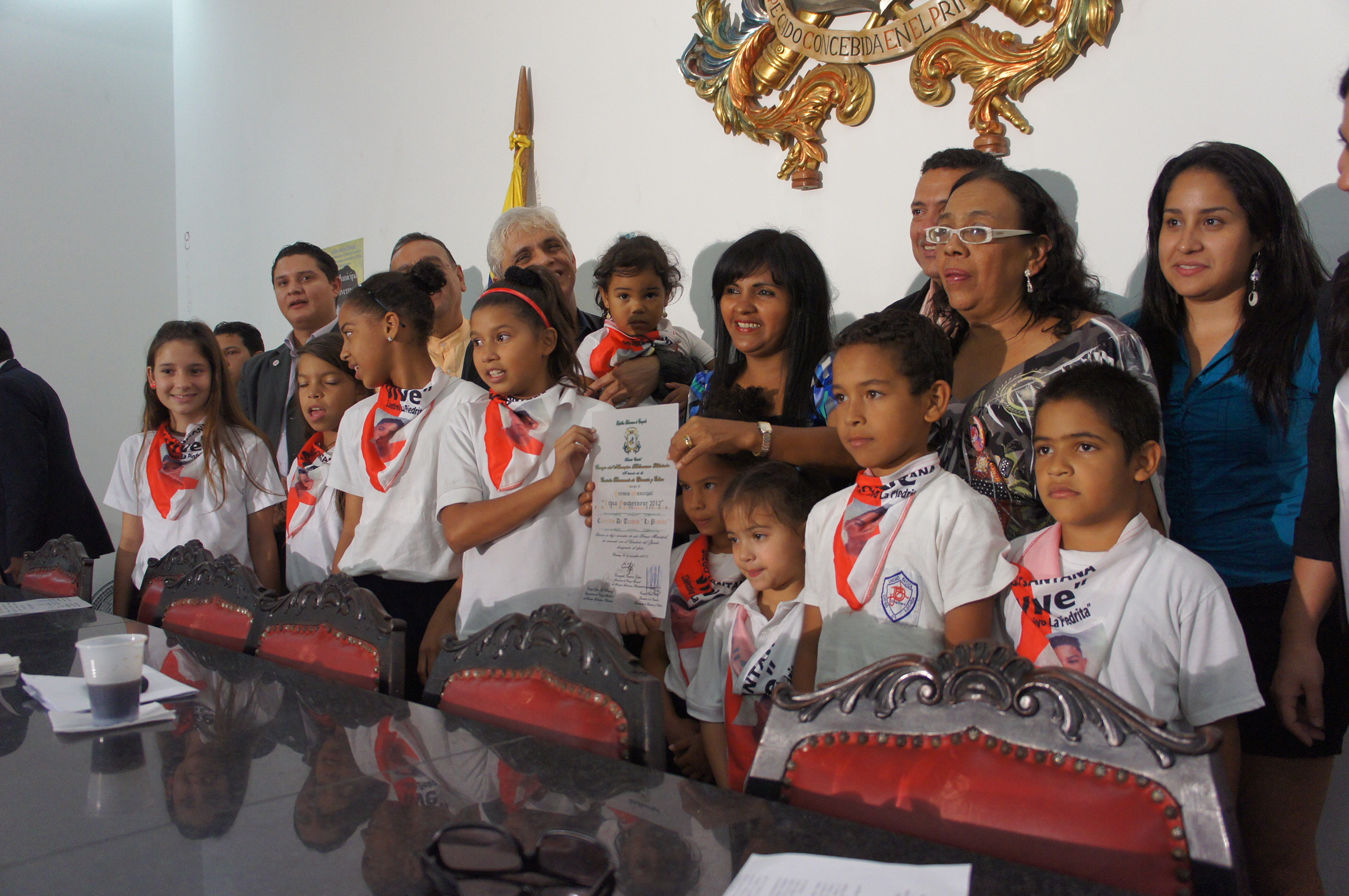
Children of La Piedrita receiving awards at the Palacio Municipal de Caracas.

The colectivo has control of a radio station as well as a clinic which was once run by Cuban doctors, though they had left due to the crisis in Venezuela. They also manage community gardens and farms. However, the colectivo is more recognized for their violent behavior.

=== Political violence ===
La Piedrita members have been described as "political shock troops for the Chavista regime" and often violently repressed political dissent in Venezuela in order to support the Bolivarian government. This political violence included attacking protesters and members of the media. Despite being wanted for multiple homicides in Venezuela, the colectivo's founder Valentín Santana has enjoyed impunity and has been seen with high-level officials of the Venezuelan government, including commander of the Bolivarian National Guard, General Fabio Zavarse.

== See also ==
- Colectivo (Venezuela)
- Units of Battle Hugo Chávez
- Immediate Mobilization Networks
