= Urban Land Committees =

Venezuelan local neighbourhood committees

Urban Land Committees (Spanish: Comités de Tierras Urbanas, CTUs) are Venezuelan local neighbourhood committees which, in conjunction with Venezuelan Communal Councils, develop land titling in urban areas. CTUs are organised and set up by local communities (around 100–200 families), in a contiguous area defined by the community. Under a February 2002 decree, the CTUs can apply to a government office for the local "barrio" residents to be given property title for state-owned land they have informally occupied on a long-term basis.

== History ==
Eligibility was however restricted to cases of state-owned land with no competing private claims.

By October 2006 the government said that over 200,000 titles had been assigned, benefiting about one million inhabitants.

In September 2006 a new law was passed, and amended in October 2009.

In May 2008 the third national convention of CTUs took place in Maracaibo, with international observers from Argentina and Uruguay and several other organizations.
