= Units of Battle Hugo Chávez =

Political organization in Venezuela

- Unidades de Batalla Hugo Chávez
- Abbreviation: UBCh
- Location: Venezuela
- Parent organization: PSUV
- Affiliations: Government of Venezuela

The Units of Battle Hugo Chávez (UBCh) is a collection of organizations with multiple members of PSUV involved that has both military and political characteristics.

== History ==
The UBCh originated as a group to defend the Bolivarian Revolution and support PSUV through electoral processes in Venezuela.

=== 2014 Venezuelan protests ===
These groups of guarimberos, fascists and violent [people], and today now other sectors of the country’s population as well have gone out on the streets, I call on the UBCh, on the communal councils, on communities, on colectivos: flame that is lit, flame that is extinguished.

— President Nicolás Maduro

During the 2014 Venezuelan protests, the Venezuelan government called on the UBCh to counter those protesting against the Venezuelan government. On 16 February, Nicolás Maduro confirmed that President of the National Assembly, Diosdado Cabello, was to oversee the deployment of PSUV throughout the country for "peace efforts" during the protests. Later that day, governor of Carabobo State, Francisco Ameliach, stated on Twitter, "UBCH, get ready for the fulminating counter-attack. Diosdado will give the order #Respect, Gringos&Fascists". On 18 February, armed individuals on motorcycles appeared at a protest in Valencia, the capital city of Carabobo State, and opened fire on protesters. One protester, Génesis Carmona, was shot in the head and died a day later. On 5 March, President Maduro also called on multiple government supporting groups himself, with such groups including the UBCh and colectivos, which he ordered to make sure protests were "extinguished".

== Tasks ==
The UBCh have vehicles, radios and resources to respond to any call made by the Venezuelan government. According to Elías Jaua, a leader of the PSUV, members of the UBCh must study the Chavista doctrine, must be responsible for mobilization, political action, including using propaganda about achievements of the Bolivarian Revolution, take place in government projects for communities and to combat "enemies" of the Bolivarian Revolution "in all fields".

=== Ten Commandments of the UBCh ===
The Ten Commandments of the UBCh according to the PSUV are the following:

1. Study and practice the teaching of ethics and politics of Chávez.
2. Strengthen and expand more and more in the forefront of the unit.
3. Take a historic commitment to be at the forefront of the drive and organization of all social and political forces of the Revolution in the community level to strengthen the people's government.
4. Be a permanent element of propaganda and mobilization around the country to publicize and promote the achievements and future plans of the Bolivarian Revolution in Venezuela.
5. Defend achievements of the revolution and fight in any terrain against enemies of the Fatherland together with the National Armed Forces.
6. To exercise social control tasks in the community.
7. A commitment to be at the forefront of building the Homeland Homes Network in the community and house to house visits.
8. Being the link between the community and the Revolutionary Government to achieve the solution of the most sensitive problems and actively participate in the Street Government program of the National Government.
9. A commitment to be at the forefront in shaping the People's Struggle and Good Living Circles.
10. Organize and accomplish tasks to win elections at all levels.

== See also ==
- Colectivo (Venezuela)
- La Piedrita
- Immediate Mobilization Networks
- Committees for the Defense of the Revolution
