= Venezuela and state-sponsored terrorism =

Venezuela-related controversy

The governments of Hugo Chávez and Nicolás Maduro have provided economic, political and military support to the Revolutionary Armed Forces of Colombia (FARC-EP) (Note: Guerrilla group classified as a terrorist organization by the United States and the European Union) and the National Liberation Army (ELN). (Note: Classified as a terrorist organization by the governments of Colombia, the United States, Canada, New Zealand, and the European Union.) The support of Colombian leftist guerrillas has continued during the government of Nicolás Maduro. By 2018, the investigative group InSight Crime reported that the ELN operated in at least 12 of Venezuela's 23 states. The Venezuelan NGO Fundación Redes (Fundaredes) in 2018 documented more than 250 reports of Venezuelans who were victims of recruitment by Colombian irregular groups. Recruitment has also been denounced by Colombian media.

== Background ==
Since the 1990s, the National Liberation Army (ELN) began to establish positions in the western border states of Venezuela. The ELN grew close to Venezuelan officials during the tenure of Venezuelan president Hugo Chávez, with Chávez approving relationships with the group.

== Hugo Chávez administration ==
The Colombian Army's military intelligence has intercepted FARC-EP communications in which they use the nickname El amigo (The friend) to refer to Hugo Chávez.

Before the 2002 coup attempt, discontent within the military started when President Hugo Chávez forced them to assist the FARC, a militant Colombian guerrilla group involved in illegal drug trade, with setting up camps in Venezuelan territories, providing ammunition to fight the Colombian government, supplying ID cards so they could move freely through Venezuela and sending members of Bolivarian Circles to their camps to receive guerilla training. The International Institute for Strategic Studies (IISS) accused Chávez's government of funding FARC's Caracas office and giving it access to intelligence services, and said that during the 2002 coup attempt that, "FARC also responded to requests from (Venezuela's intelligence service) to provide training in urban terrorism involving targeted killings and the use of explosives." Venezuelan diplomats denounced the IISS' findings saying that they had "basic inaccuracies".

In 2002, Venezuelan journalists Marianella Salazar, Ibéyise Pacheco, Marta Colomina and Patricia Poleo presented a video of a meeting between the Venezuelan army and the FARC-EP recorded in June 2000. Pacheco declared that in the dialogue heard in the video between the Venezuelan operation commanding officer and the head of the FARC's 33rd front, Rubén Zamora, there is talk of good relations between the two parties. The chief general of the Armed Forces, Lucas Rincón, said that the recording showed only a humanitarian mission of the Army.

In 2006, the United States imposed an arms embargo on Venezuela that banned all U.S. commercial arms sales and re-transfers to Venezuela. The United States State Department argued that Venezuela was not fully cooperating with U.S. antiterrorism efforts.

In 2007, authorities in Colombia claimed that through laptops they had seized on a raid against Raúl Reyes, they found documents purporting to show that Hugo Chávez offered payments of as much as $300 million to the FARC "among other financial and political ties that date back years" and documents showing the FARC rebels sought Venezuelan assistance in acquiring surface-to-air missiles, and alleging that Chávez met personally with rebel leaders. According to Interpol, the files found by Colombian forces were considered to be authentic. Howerver, independent analyses of the documents by a number of U.S. academics and journalists have challenged the Colombian interpretation of the documents, accusing the Colombian government of exaggerating their contents. According to Greg Palast, the claim about Chávez's $300 million is based on the following (translated) sentence: "With relation to the 300, which from now on we will call 'dossier', efforts are now going forward at the instructions of the cojo [slang term for 'cripple'], which I will explain in a separate note." The separate note is allegedly speaking of a hostage exchange with the FARC that Chávez was supposedly helping to negotiate at that time. Palast suggests that the "300" is supposedly a reference to "300 prisoners" (the number involved in a FARC prisoner exchange) and not "300 million".

On 16 December 2007, journalist John Carlin published an article in the Spanish newspaper El País, citing four FARC defectors and several intelligence and diplomatic sources, describing an "extensive and systematic cooperation that certain Venezuelan authorities provide to the FARC in their drug trafficking operations". According to the defectors, Venezuelan authorities provided protection to at least four Colombian guerrilla camps in Venezuelan territory, with one saying that "the National Guard and the Army offer their services in exchange for money", and the intelligence sources said that they have "solid" information that Ingrid Betancourt, a Colombian presidential candidate kidnapped by the FARC, was in Venezuela.

The Chávez government did not consider the FARC-EP as terrorists and requested a belligerent status for said group and that they be excluded from the lists of terrorist organizations of the Latin American governments and the European Union. Chávez specifically declared when presenting his 2007 annual report before the Venezuelan National Assembly that the FARC "are not a terrorist corps, they are real armies that occupy space in Colombia, they must be recognized, they are insurgent forces that have a political project, a Bolivarian project, which is respected here". President of the European Commission José Manuel Barroso rejected this proposal and reaffirmed the European Community's position regarding the FARC-EP's terrorist designation.

In 2008, the U.S. Department of Treasury accused two senior Venezuelan government officials and one former official of providing material assistance for drug-trafficking operations carried out by the FARC guerrilla group in Colombia. Later that year, the Secretary General of the Organization of American States, Jose Miguel Insulza, testified before the U.S. Congress that "there are no evidences [sic]" that Venezuela is supporting "terrorist groups", including the FARC.

The evidence about the FARC-EP presence that has had more impact includes satellite photographs and intelligence video, where structures similar to camps (with housing and military training areas) can be seen on the Venezuelan side of the border with Colombia, which reportedly belonged to the FARC-EP guerrillas. Venezuelan foreign minister Nicolás Maduro initially denied the existence of these camps and rejected the proposal to visit the area together with international observers to verify the claims. Extortion by the FARC-EP of Venezuelan citizens within the territory has been reported since at least 2008, who are given their respective payment receipts. On 4 February 2010, the Central Intelligence Agency and Federal Bureau of Investigation American federal agencies stated in a report that "Chávez was covertly supporting the FARC-EP".

== Nicolás Maduro administration ==
In 2010, leader of the Spanish separatist group ETA Iñaki de Juana Chaos fled to Venezuela from Northern Ireland in 2010 while appealing an extradition order in Spain. By 2015, he lived and ran a liquor store Chichiriviche. The same year at least two other ETA leaders resided in Venezuela: Arturo Cubillas and Xabier Arruti Imaz.

On 8 February 2017, a joint CNN and CNN en Español year-long investigation called "Passports in the Shadows" (Spanish: Pasaportes en la sombra) - based on the information provided by a whistleblower and subsequent investigations, reported that employees of the Venezuelan embassy in Baghdad, Iraq has been selling passports and visas to persons from Middle Eastern countries (specifically Syria, Palestine, Iran, Iraq and Pakistan) with dubious backgrounds for profits. The Venezuelan immigration department, SAIME, confirmed the sold passports' genuineness as each passport came with an assigned national identification number, although the names of the individuals were altered when checking against the national database. At least one individual's place of birth was also changed from Iraq to Venezuela. According to Misael López Soto, a former employee at the Venezuelan embassy in Iraq who was also a lawyer and CICPC officer, the Bolivarian government would sell authentic passports to individuals from the Middle East, with the Venezuelan passport able to access 130 countries throughout the world without a visa requirement. López provided CNN documents showing how his superiors attempted to cover up the sale of passports, which were being sold from $5,000 to $15,000 per passport. López Soto fled the Venezuelan embassy in Iraq in 2015 to meet with the FBI in Spain, with a Venezuelan official who assisted him to fly out of the country being killed the same day. The investigation also found that between 2008 and 2012, Aragua Governor Tareck El Aissami ordered for hundreds of Middle Eastern individuals to obtain illegal passports, including members of Hezbollah. The Venezuelan foreign minister, Delcy Rodríguez, denied the government's involvement when questioned by the reporters during the Seventy-first session of the United Nations General Assembly and accused the network of performing what she described as an "imperialistic media operation" against Venezuela for airing the investigation. On 14 February 2017, Venezuelan authorities ceased the broadcasting of CNN en Español two days after the Venezuelan president, Nicolás Maduro, ordered CNN to "(get) well away from here". The government deemed the report "(A threat to) the peace and democratic stability of our Venezuelan people since they generate an environment of intolerance." Venezuelan National Commission of Telecommunications director Andrés Eloy Méndez accused CNN en Español of instigating religious, racial and political hatred, violence and other themes.

The investigative group InSight Crime reported that the National Liberation Army (ELN) operated in at least 12 of Venezuela's 23 states by 2018. The Venezuelan NGO Fundación Redes (Fundaredes) in 2018 documented more than 250 reports of Venezuelans who were victims of recruitment by Colombian irregular groups. Recruitment has also been denounced by Colombian media. Insight Crime states that Venezuelan president Nicolás Maduro was tolerant of the ELN, explaining that "ELN's expansion in Venezuela has been marked by the Maduro administration's inaction and even encouragement towards the group", with reports from Venezuelan NGO Fundación Redes that the Venezuelan military had possibly armed ELN members.

In January 2019, the Redes Foundation denounced in the Colombian Public Ministry that armed groups made up of ELN members and FARC dissidents, supported by the Bolivarian National Police and FAES officials, killed two Venezuelan protesters, Eduardo José Marrero and Luigi Ángel Guerrero, during a protest in the frontier city of San Cristóbal, in Táchira state. Other protesters were injured during the shooting. The ELN supported Nicolás Maduro during the Venezuelan presidential crisis and said they "would fight" United States troops if they invaded Venezuela. On 28 July 2019, during the XXV São Paulo Forum held in Caracas, Nicolás Maduro declared that FARC-EP dissidents Iván Márquez and Jesús Santrich were "welcome" in Venezuela and at the São Paulo Forum.

In 2019, the opposition-led National Assembly of Venezuela designated the colectivos (irregular, leftist Venezuelan community organizations that support Nicolás Maduro, the Bolivarian government and the Great Patriotic Pole) as terrorist groups due to their "violence, paramilitary actions, intimidation, murders and other crimes", declaring their acts as state-sponsored terrorism.

On 2021, Venezuelan activist Javier Tarazona requested to the Public Ministry an investigation into the relationship of government officials with the ELN, presenting a photograph showing Ramón Rodríguez Chacín with his wife Carola and ELN guerrilla leaders Nicolás Rodríguez Bautista ("Gabino"), Eliecer Chamorro Acosta ("Antonio García") and Israel Ramírez Pineda ("Pablo Beltrán"). The following day, Tarazona and two others activists were arrested by the Bolivarian Intelligence Service and charged with "incitement to hatred, terrorism and treason". By 2024, Tarazona continued under detention.

Colombian President Iván Duque accused Maduro of assisting FARC and providing a safe haven for militants in Venezuela too.

== See also ==
- Iran and state-sponsored terrorism
- Israel and state-sponsored terrorism
- Pakistan and state-sponsored terrorism
- United States and state-sponsored terrorism
- Qatar and state-sponsored terrorism
- Terrorism and the Soviet Union
