= Bolivarian Circles =

Venezuelan organizations of workers' councils

- Círculos bolivarianos
- Founders: Hugo Chávez, Diosdado Cabello, Miguel Rodríguez Torres
- Founded: 21 December 2001; 24 years ago
- Dissolved: 10 April 2006; 20 years ago (domestic circles)
- Headquarters: Miraflores Palace, Caracas, Venezuela
- Size: 2.2 million (2003)

The Bolivarian Circles (Spanish: Círculos bolivarianos) are political and social organizations of workers' councils in Venezuela, originally created by President Hugo Chávez on 21 December 2001. The circles have also been described as militias and compared to Cuba's Committees for the Defense of the Revolution and Panama's Dignity Battalions.

Following the involvement of Bolivarian Circles in defending President Chávez during the 2002 Venezuelan coup d'état attempt, the government sponsored the creation of official communal councils on 10 April 2006, some of which became armed colectivos instead.

== Background ==
In April 2001, President Hugo Chávez tasked then-Vice President Diosdado Cabello and Miguel Rodríguez Torres to create and finance community organizations that would share local interests to Chávez so his government could lend resources and gain political support. Such support from the government made Chávez's opponents skeptical of any claims of autonomy. They are named in honor of Simón Bolívar, the leader who transformed most of South America from Spanish colonial outposts to the independent states now in place.

The circles were created as state-sanctioned groups that were to be the "principle organizing unit of popular power" and were announced by Chávez as "a great human network" that was created to defend the Bolivarian Revolution. Some circles were modeled after the Dignity Battalions that were created by Omar Torrijos and Manuel Noriega in Panama since Chávez admired the model when stationed there during his military career. The founding documents of Venezuela's Bolivarian Circles state that "the Supreme leader of Bolivarian Circles will be the President of the Bolivarian Republic of Venezuela" and that "the national and international headquarters for the registration of Bolivarian Circles will be the Palace of Miraflores".

Some Bolivarian Circles were given combat training and weapons, with some of their leaders being trained in Cuba. According to Lina Ron, a Chávez supporter and head of her own Bolivarian Circle, La Piedrita, thousands of circles deeply loyal to Chávez were "armed to the teeth". Chávez denied allegations of funding and the circles use of weapons.

== History ==
In January 2002, Bolivarian Circles were reported to have blocked the entrance of the newspaper office El Nacional for over an hour. Numerous journalists have been threatened, berated, and abused physically and verbally, particularly by people that identified with the Bolivarian Circles.

Bolivarian Circles also took part in demonstrations that became violent against the 2002 coup attempt. Shortly after the coup attempt in a May 2002 cable from the US Embassy in Caracas, there were concerned reports of members of Bolivarian Circles receiving new motorcycles, Nike brand clothing and that members of the Bolivarian Circles became armed, causing panic in neighborhoods. Numbers of Bolivarian Circles also increased significantly that month according to Diosdado Cabello, with number rising from 80,000 to 130,000.

=== 2007 protests ===
On 7 November 2007, masked gunmen riding motorcycles opened fire on students returning from a march in Caracas. At the Central University of Venezuela, eight people were injured, including one by gunfire.

=== Colectivos ===
According to private intelligence agency company Stratfor, Bolivarian Circles were also the parent organization of colectivos in Venezuela.

== See also ==
- Colectivo (Venezuela)
- Revolución Bolivariana
- Venezuelan Communal Councils
