= Colectivo (Venezuela) =

Paramilitary groups that support the Venezuelan government

Colectivos
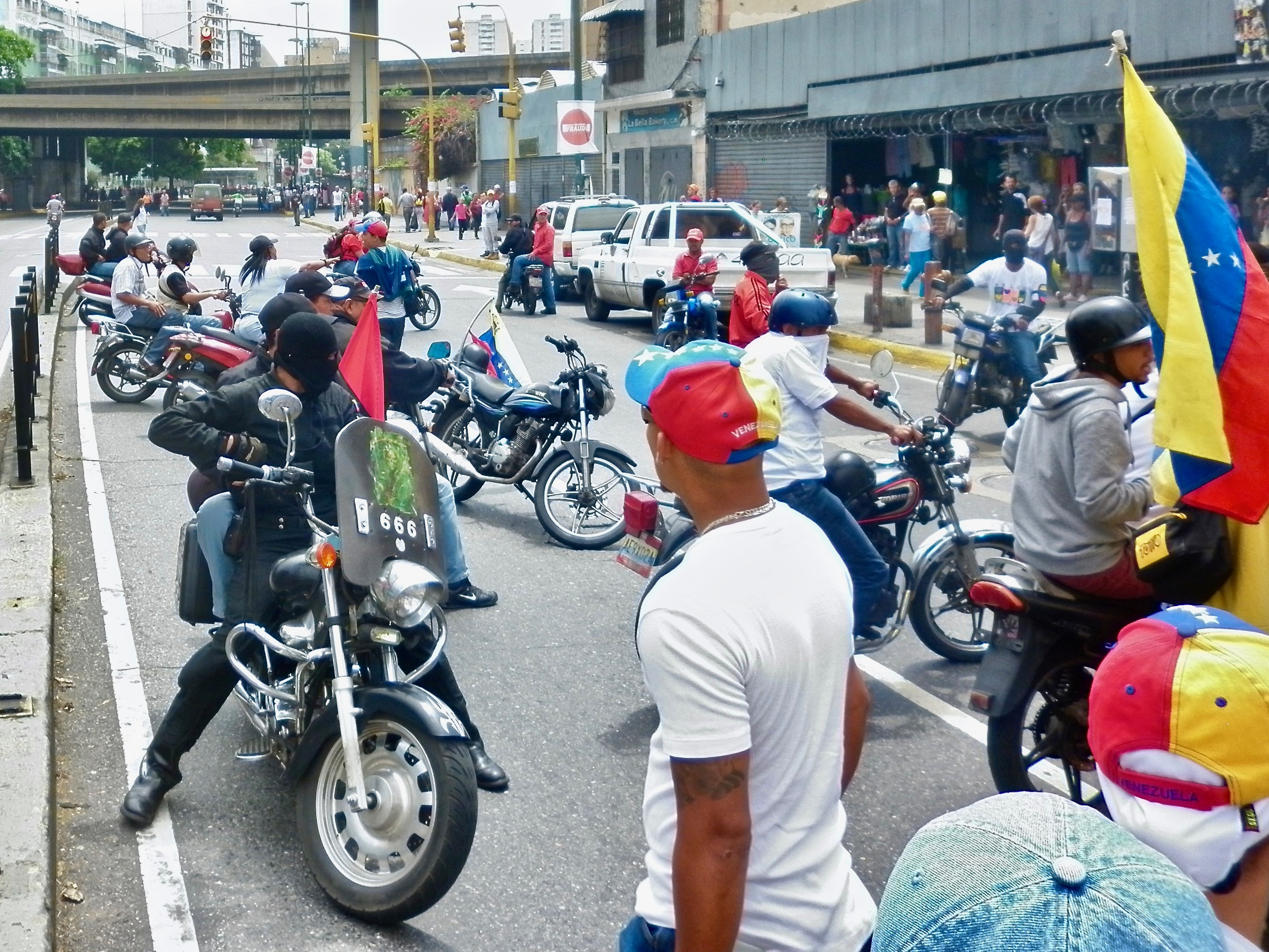
- Colectivos gathered during the Mother of All Marches in 2017
- Founding leader: Hugo Chávez (modern iteration)
- Political leader: Nicolás Maduro (until 2026)
- Dates active: 1960s/1990s-present
- Country: Venezuela
- Allegiance: Bolivarian Government of Venezuela: United Socialist Party of Venezuela (PSUV); Great Patriotic Pole (GPP)
- Groups: La Piedrita; Tupamaro; Alexis Vive; Collective Simón Bolívar; Coordinator March 5 Front; José Leonardo Chirinos; Collective Montaraz-Salvador Allende; Collective Pérez Bonalde; Collective Tres Raíces
- Ideology: Bolivarianism; Chavismo; Socialism of the 21st century

Colectivos ([ko.lek'ti.βos], lit. 'collectives') are Venezuelan armed paramilitary groups that support the Bolivarian government, the Great Patriotic Pole (GPP) political alliance and Venezuela's ruling party, the United Socialist Party of Venezuela (PSUV). Colectivo has become an umbrella term for irregular armed groups that operate in poverty-stricken areas. The term may also refer to a community organization with any shared purpose, such as a neighborhood group that organizes social events. Some colectivos began by doing community work or helping with social programs in barrios, and their members said they promoted democracy, political activism and culture.

As of 2019, there are dozens of colectivos in Venezuela. In 2018, InSight Crime wrote that there were 46 groups in the 23 de Enero neighbourhood. By 2017, they operate in 16 Venezuelan states, controlling about 10% of Venezuelan cities. Some personnel of Venezuela's intelligence agencies, including the Directorate General of Military Counterintelligence and the Bolivarian Intelligence Service, are also members of colectivos. Colectivos have both legal and illegal funding sources. They were initially funded by the Bolivarian government; some receive funds to distribute government food packages, and have access to government "slush funds". Others have been funded by extortion, black-market food and the drug trade.

Human Rights Watch described colectivos as "armed gangs who use violence with impunity" to harass political opponents of the Venezuelan government. Amnesty International calls them "armed pro-government supporters who are tolerated or supported by the authorities". Colectivos have attacked anti-government protesters and Venezuelan opposition television staff, sent death threats to journalists, and once tear-gassed the Vatican envoy. Through violence and intimidation, by 2019 colectivos increasingly became a means of quashing the opposition and maintaining political power; Maduro called on them during the 2019 Venezuelan blackouts.

An Organization of American States report on human rights violations in Venezuela stated that colectivos murdered at least 131 individuals between 2014 and 2017 during anti-government protests. The opposition-led National Assembly of Venezuela designated the colectivos as terrorist groups due to their "violence, paramilitary actions, intimidation, murders and other crimes", declaring their acts as state-sponsored terrorism. On 16 September 2020, the United Nations Independent International Fact-Finding Mission on Venezuela concluded in its first report that Venezuelan authorities and colectivos committed "violations amounting to crimes against humanity". The same year, the Office of the Prosecutor of the International Criminal Court stated that it believed there was a "reasonable basis" to believe that "since at least April 2017, civilian authorities, members of the armed forces and pro-government individuals have committed the crimes against humanity".

== Description ==
The Office of the United Nations High Commissioner for Human Rights has described colectivos as "pro-Government armed groups" that "decide who receives government assistance and perform surveillance and intelligence activities for the authorities [and have] intimidated, threatened and attacked people perceived as opposed to the Government". In 2019, the opposition-led National Assembly of Venezuela designated the colectivos as terrorist groups, declaring their acts as state-sponsored terrorism.

On 16 September 2020, the United Nations Independent International Fact-Finding Mission on Venezuela presented its first report to the United Nations Human Rights Council, concluding that Venezuelan authorities and colectivos committed "violations amounting to crimes against humanity". Its members stated that they had reasonable grounds to state: "Most of the violations and crimes ... were part of a widespread and systematic attack against a civilian population ... in furtherance of a state policy.” On 14 December 2020, the Office of the Prosecutor of the International Criminal Court stated that it believed there was a "reasonable basis" to believe that "since at least April 2017, civilian authorities, members of the armed forces and pro-government individuals have committed the crimes against humanity".

New York University Latin American Studies professor Alejandro Velasco said in 2019, "They have all the trappings of a paramilitary repressive force." Velasco, who studies colectivos, describes a change in the allegiance of colectivos, saying it has become more about power than supporting chavismo or a leftist ideology.

== History ==
The history of colectivos predates the presidency of Hugo Chávez. Colectivos emerged during the 1960s from urban guerrilla warfare as local sub-units of the Armed Forces of National Liberation and other revolutionary leftist organizations in metropolitan Venezuela, and made a return and major revival during Chávez's tenure, when he created their parent organizations, known as Bolivarian Circles. Bolivarian Circles also took part in demonstrations that became violent against the 2002 coup attempt against Chávez. InSight Crime says their power began to increase after the attempted coup, when Chávez decided he needed a security force independent of the military to counteract opposition demonstrators. A 2005 report by the newspaper El Nacional stated that paramilitary and motorcycle groups, described as "colectivos", were present in 36 cities around the country. In 2006, they received arms and funding from the state when they were brought under the government's community councils. In 2007, masked gunmen riding motorcycles opened fire on students returning from a march in Caracas. At the Central University of Venezuela, eight people were injured, including one by gunfire. Chávez eliminated the Metropolitan Police in 2011, turning security over to the colectivos in some Caracas barrios.

Bloomberg says that when he created the Bolivarian Circles, Chávez "brought the former outlaws into the socialist fold", where some also gained access to weapons through government jobs. Stratfor says that Diosdado Cabello, then serving as chief of staff for Chávez, was instrumental in the founding of the Bolivarian Circles, and maintains close ties to the colectivos. Chávez assigned colectivos to be "the armed wing of the Bolivarian Revolution" for the Venezuelan government, giving them weapons, communication systems, motorcycles and surveillance equipment to exercise control in the hills of Caracas where police are forbidden entry. Some weapons given to the groups include assault rifles, submachine guns and grenades. Almost all colectivos are community organisations. During Chavez' presidency, they became the main form of democratic community organising in Venezuela. Various colectivos have said that the Venezuelan government has had authorities disguise themselves as colectivo members in attempts to attack the opposition.

Colectivos act as "enforcers for the government", working with the Venezuelan armed forces and the ruling political party, PSUV. The Economist says they bring money into slums, punish criminals and intimidate political opponents. Some colectivos partake in drug trafficking, control access to the supply of food and medicine, and commit acts of extortion.

In 2008, some colectivos helped with after-school programs, child care centers, puppet shows, drug rehabilitation, and sports programs; they also encouraged voting by going door to door and protect communities from criminals. Every member of a colectivo is required to bring ten individuals to vote at polls during elections. Over time, colectivos became more heavily armed and their criminal activity increased. A small number of groups maintain community and cultural functions; most are "criminal gangs with immense social control", who "work alongside the security forces, often doing their dirty work for them", according to InSight Crime. Members can be difficult to identify because they often wear masks and do not have license plates on their motorcycles.

== Activity ==
=== 2002 coup d'état attempt ===
When Chávez was briefly ousted in 2002, colectivos helped lead demonstrations supporting him, and worked with the military to help return him as president.

=== 2009 Globovisión attack ===
In 2009, several dozen La Piedrita motorcyclists with red berets surrounded the entrance of the offices of television station Globovisión and subdued the security guards, entering the facility by force while tossing two tear gas canisters into the building. Chávez condemned the attack and pro-government leader Lina Rón was jailed for three months following the incident.

=== 2009 Vatican envoy attack ===
Colectivos tear-gassed the Vatican envoy in 2009 after Chávez accused the Roman Catholic Church of interfering with his government.

=== 2012 presidential election ===
During the 2012 presidential election, at a visit by opposition candidate Henrique Capriles to the San José de Cotiza neighbourhood in Caracas, a group of armed PSUV members began firing guns "in an apparent effort to break up the rally". Five people were injured, including the son of an opposition member of the National Assembly of Venezuela. Capriles was subsequently taken safely from the scene. Journalists for television channel Globovisión that were covering the rally (reporter Sasha Ackerman, cameraman Frank Fernández and assistant Esteban Navas) were threatened by the armed men, who confiscated their equipment and footage of the shootings. A Globovisión statement the next day identified the armed men as PSUV supporters, saying "These groups wore red shirts identifying them with a political tendency. More importantly, it was an armed and organized group that fired weapons against people".

==== Immediate Mobilization Networks ====
Immediate Mobilization Networks (in Spanish: Fuerzas Inmediatas de Movilización) were an alleged paramilitary organization formed by Venezuelan President Hugo Chávez to remain in control of the country if he was defeated in the 2012 presidential election. Its objectives were to abort the opposition rallies before they could be prepared, detection of opposition leaders, organizing street protests and resistance and control of territory.

Chávez militias have been responsible (along with the Army) from the custody of the electoral process (polling security, custody of the votes and his move to places count). A first contingent would be deployed in 51% of polling stations, the rest at 49%, precisely in many of the places where the opposition is strong.

Of its approximately 3,800 members, not everyone would have military targets. Some of them could be limited to monitoring process, but other functions provided for these groups, composed of small teams of five to seven members, require violence. Venezuelan Army sources said that in June they started handing out about 8,000 AK-103 to this group.

They were formed by "social intelligence teams" and "communicators in action" ("street propaganda and guerrilla internet") and of "territorial control equipment," constituted "as Rapid Action Force and Action street, with ability to block or enable critical road corridors, geographic areas or localities" and "defend the spaces adjacent to state institutions."

Their tactics were based on Iranian Basij units whose performance was decisive to abort the 2009 Iranian presidential election protests in 2009, and used a complex system of communication encryption.

=== 2013 presidential election ===
During the 2013 presidential election, Reuters said colectivos were "a key part of the government's electoral machinery" that "help[ed] sway close races and are sometimes tarred by critics as poll station thugs who intimidate opponents". The Carter Center said that during the elections, voting centers had an "intimidating climate" when motorcyclists "associated with the governing party" surrounded them.

=== 2014 protests ===
Colectivos fire toward the protest where Genesis Carmona was killed during a protest.

"President Maduro himself has on multiple occasions called on civilian groups loyal to the government to 'extinguish the flame' of what he characterized as 'fascist' protesters. ... [saying] 'These groups of guarimberos, fascists and violent [people], and today now other sectors of the country's population as well have gone out on the streets, I call on the UBCh, on the communal councils, on communities, on colectivos: flame that is lit, flame that is extinguished'."

— Human Rights Watch

The Venezuelan Prison Minister, Iris Varela, said that colectivos were a "fundamental pillar in the defense of the homeland". During the 2014 Venezuelan protests against new president Nicolás Maduro, colectivos acted with impunity against the opposition protesters. When armed groups threatened to rape individuals in an apartment complex in Maracaibo, the National Guard did not intervene. The Civil Association for Citizen Control said that more than half of those killed during the protests were killed by colectivos.

During the 2014 protests, armed colectivos attacked and burned a large portion of Fermín Toro University after intimidating student protesters and shooting one. The colectivos broke into the facility, looted, and damaged 40% of the university.

President Maduro thanked some groups of motorcyclists for their help against what he viewed as a "fascist coup d'etat... being waged by the extreme right"; at the same time, he distanced himself from armed groups by stating that they "had no place in the revolution". Jorge Arreaza, Venezuela's vice president at the time, also praised them saying, "If there has been exemplary behavior it has been the behavior of the motorcycle colectivos that are with the Bolivarian revolution." In 2014, Arreaza promised that the government would disarm all irregular armed groups in Venezuela.

The European Parliament asked the Venezuelan government to "immediately disarm and dissolve the uncontrolled armed pro-government groups and end their impunity". United States Secretary of State John Kerry accused the Venezuelan government of using "armed vigilantes" against those who opposed it.

In a report titled "Punished for Protesting", Human Rights Watch (HRW) stated that government forces allowed colectivos "to attack protesters, journalists, students, or people they believed to be opponents of the government with security forces just meters away" and that "in some cases, the security forces openly collaborated with the pro-government attackers". HRW also stated that they "found compelling evidence of uniformed security forces and pro-government gangs attacking protesters side by side", and that the government tolerated this activity.

=== Robert Serra's murder ===
Rising PSUV member and colectivo mediator Robert Serra was stabbed more than 30 times, killing him, in his "heavily guarded home" on 1 October 2014. The Venezuelan government blamed the opposition for Serra's death; Foreign Policy said others considered his murder an "inside job" because the government was "more factionalized since the death of Hugo Chávez" with different "ideological strains and interests [clashing] beneath the party's surface".

A week after Serra's death, clashes between Venezuelan police and colectivos began when police raided the headquarters of the Shield of the Revolution group and according to José Odreman, "a close associate of Serra" and leader of the 5 de Marzo group, a colectivo member was "shot dead in his sleep" during the raid. Three officers were reportedly taken hostage.

Right before he was shot, Odreman had made statements hinting at government involvement in Serra's death, saying to Minister Miguel Rodríguez Torres, "I lay full responsibility on you of what might happen to me. Enough comrades have been sacrificed". A little over an hour after his statements, photographs emerged showing the 5 de Marzo colectivo leader Odreman being held captive by Venezuelan authorities, followed by videos which showed his dead body lying in a pool of blood.

The Venezuelan government denied any relationship to Serra's death and stated that the clashes between colectivos and authorities were due to a murder investigation. The director of CICPC, José Gregorio Sierralta, stated that officers were fired upon and responded with deadly force that killed the colectivo members including Odreman. Residents of the building denied Sierralta's statements, stating that there was no confrontation or hostages, that Venezuelan authorities first raided the building reportedly killing one member in his sleep then raided the building once more supposedly capturing and executing the other four colectivo members, altered nearby evidence and stole items from the scene. Maduro stated that the five men who were killed in the incident were a gang of former police officers led by Odreman. Runrunes noted in an investigative article that the police and bodyguards arrested by Venezuelan authorities involved with Serra's death were also members of colectivos.

Following the clashes, Humberto López ("El Ché"), a colectivo leader, stated that all colectivos were on "war footing" and that the colectivos "did not bet on death, we are committed to war. All colectivos are up in arms." Noting that the Venezuelan Housing Mission buildings are in the hills of Caracas, El Ché assured that "the people would come down from the hills" if needed. Colectivos protested against the incidents and demanded the dismissal of then Ministry of Popular Power for Interior, Justice and Peace, Miguel Rodríguez Torres. Weeks later, on 24 October, Rodríguez Torres was replaced by Carmen Meléndez, with one of the reasons reportedly being the pressure colectivos placed on the government. Maduro also called on Freddy Bernal, a government leader with close ties to colectivos, to "reform" the police after the incident. Following the dismissal of Rodríguez Torres, the 5 de Marzo colectivo also called for the dismissal of Diosdado Cabello.

=== Attack on the University of Los Andes ===
Armed groups reported to be colectivos attacked the University of Los Andes in the city of Mérida in March 2015 to intimidate the protesters, shooting guns at students and faculty, holding the students hostage and stealing belongings of students.

=== 2017 protests ===
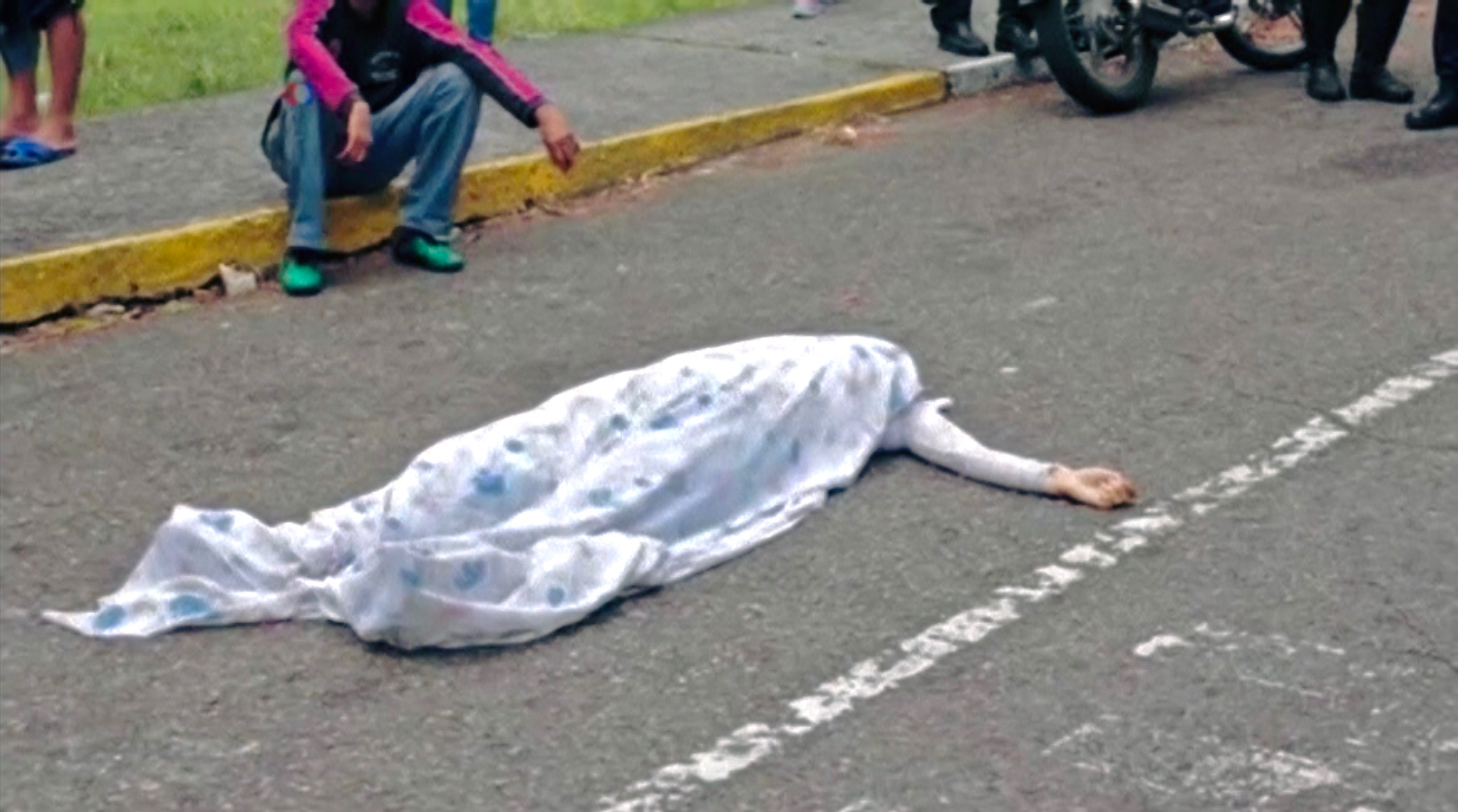
Body of Paola Ramírez

During the 2017 Venezuelan protests against Maduro, The New York Times stated that colectivos "appear to be playing a key role in repressing dissent"; they fight alongside officials and "engage in fiercer and often deadly intimidation". Bloomberg News said Maduro "unleashed the gangs on a large scale" during the protests. Days before the Mother of All Marches, Diosdado Cabello, a high-level PSUV official loyal to the Bolivarian government, stated that 60,000 motorized colectivos and the Bolivarian Militia would be spread throughout Caracas on 19 April to deter the opposition's march, calling the protest terrorism. During that march, Carlos Moreno, a 17-year-old boy, and 23-year-old Paola Ramírez, were killed by members of colectivos.

Colectivos also attacked Venezuela's opposition-majority National Assembly in 2017. Taking over the building where the legislature meets, they beat deputies and protesters with clubs and batons, splitting open the head of one deputy.

United States Senator Marco Rubio discussing colectivos with Director of the Central Intelligence Agency, Mike Pompeo

As the 2017 protests intensified, during the 11 May United States Senate Select Committee on Intelligence Worldwide Threats Hearing (SH-216), Senator Marco Rubio discussed with Director of the Central Intelligence Agency Mike Pompeo the role and actions of colectivos in Venezuela. Rubio asked if there was a "real threat" of colectivos selling advanced weaponry to the FARC, drug cartels or terrorists on the black market, to which Director Pompeo replied, "it is a real threat ... Maduro gets more desperate by the hour, the risk of these colectivos acting in a way that is not under his control increases as time goes on as well", mentioning that there has not been evidence of major arms deals taking place, though "stockpiles exist".

=== 2018 ===
In early 2018, Voice of America said members of colectivos in Aragua state appeared on a Colombian radio show and explained that they were paid by the government to violently prevent opposition marches and that some of their colleagues had "murdered several people".

According to Meduza, the Russian government supplied "specialists" who were involved in training of colectivos back in 2018. (Note: At the time, Vladimir Putin was in charge of President.)

==== El Junquito raid ====
Colectivos were involved in the 2018 operation to kill Venezuelan rebel Óscar Alberto Pérez, working alongside Venezuelan troops during the El Junquito raid. Heiker Leobaldo Vásquez Ferrera of a colectivo located in 23 de Enero was killed during the operation, with Bellingcat and Forensic Architecture highlighting that such cooperation between colectivos and Venezuelan authorities showed there was little separation between them.

=== Presidential crisis ===
InSight Crime says that colectivos provided strong support for Maduro when he assumed the presidency in his disputed second term. With National Assembly-designated acting President of Venezuela, Juan Guaidó, challenging Maduro's claim to the office, and amid an international effort to convince Maduro to step down and allow humanitarian aid into the country, Bloomberg News reported that colectivos "led the charge" against the opposition to Maduro. Because Guaidó offered an amnesty law to officials and military officers who disavow Maduro, and the colectivos have "nothing to lose", the "government may be using colectivos to relieve pressure on the military" during the 2019 Venezuelan protests, according to Velasco.

As tens of thousands of protesters marched in support on the day that Guaidó took the oath to serve as president, The Guardian reported that Maduro "allies threatened the use of armed pro-government militias–known as colectivos—to quell disturbances". Rafael Uzcátegui—Director of Venezuela's human rights organization, PROVEA—said there were 43 deaths at the protests as of 6 February; he believed most could be attributed to Venezuela's Special Action Force (FAES), followed by the colectivos. InSight Crime said that it is likely that Maduro "recruited (...) FAES members from the colectivos for their callousness and bloodthirstiness". The Washington Post said colectivos are increasingly made up of government or police personnel.

InSight Crime says that, as a result of the crisis in Venezuela, some colectivo members "are beginning to waver in their allegiance to the government because they have not been receiving the economic benefits they once did", but that "they fear persecution should they abandon the government's revolution". The Washington Post said that Maduro relies on them and they help him stay in power in spite of a crumbling economy; Chávez was more popular and not as dependent on colectivos, while Maduro is unpopular because of the economic conditions in the country, and has resorted to violence and intimidation for power. Public Radio International stated that opposition demonstrations "are routinely broken up by masked motorcyclists who open fire onto crowds" and that the government relies on the "loyalty of these irregular paramilitary groups to deal with the public heavy-handedly rather than the military, which could potentially disobey uncomfortable orders and cause a government-military rupture". The South Florida Sun reported that "colectivos have escalated attacks (...) opening fire on civilians and terrorizing communities."

==== Shipping of humanitarian aid ====
Over the weekend of 23–24 February, as Guaidó and the opposition sought to bring humanitarian aid across Venezuela's borders and into the country, colectivos attacked people at both the Colombian and Brazilian borders. Bloomberg said "within a block of an international bridge where food and medicine were waiting" for aid to enter, "colectivos terrorized thousands". They fired weapons from speeding motorcycles, and one protester stated that masked men stepped from behind a row of Venezuelan National Guard and fired on the crowd at the Venezuelan border, while a doctor said that colectivos terrorized with weapons medics who were volunteering to help the wounded. According to a member of Bolivar and Zamora Revolutionary Current (CRBZ), a group present that was described as a colectivo, said that CRBZ went to the border to defend Venezuela's sovereignty and defend against possible military intervention. The CRBZ member said that members of the opposition collaborated with Colombian guerilla groups on the border and that some CRBZ members had to find alternative transportation home since opposition protesters burned their vehicles.

At the Brazilian border, Bloomberg reported that observers said "colectivos ran rampant"; four died and hundreds were wounded. Humberto Prado, the director of the Venezuelan Prison Observatory, "accused the Maduro government of releasing prison inmates to fill the colectivos' ranks in their repression efforts", according to InSight Crime. As many military personnel defected into Colombia during the border clashes, InSight Crime suggested that "many of those who fled (...) did so because they were forced to work with the colectivos".

==== Blackouts ====
During blackouts in March 2019, Maduro called on the armed paramilitary gangs, saying, "The time has come for active resistance". US State Department special envoy to Venezuela Elliott Abrams labeled this a "breakdown in law and order", and said, "That's calling for armed gangs to take over the streets (...) Perhaps it is a sign of Maduro's lack of confidence in his own security forces." As blackouts continued, on 31 March, citizens protested the lack of electricity and water in Caracas and other cities; some of the protests occurred close to the presidential palace. Maduro called again on the colectivos, asking them "to defend the peace of every barrio, of every block". Videos circulated on social media showing colectivos threatening protesters and shooting in the streets; two protesters were shot.

==== 2020 Barqusimeto shooting ====
On 29 February 2020, the Speaker of the National Assembly of Venezuela Juan Guaidó mobilized a march against Nicolás Maduro in the Juan de Villegas parish, Barquisimeto, Lara state. Colectivos shot at Guaido's supporters and him, who was in a van at the time, leaving ten injured.

==== Other incidents ====
On 3 November 2022, colectivos attacked and denailed four female students of the University of the Andes that were protesting against the visit in Mérida state of Diosdado Cabello, vice-president of the United Socialist Party of Venezuela (PSUV).

=== 2023 opposition primary elections ===
In the morning of the 2023 Unitary Platform presidential primaries, on 22 October, colectivos prevented the installation of the voting center in the El Guarataro neighborhood of western Caracas. The non-governmental organization Voto Joven denounced that the groups stole material from a voting table and that violence with a firearm was registered. Neighbors of the neighborhood installed the voting center after the intimidation. In Plaza La Estrella, in Caracas, the beginning of voting was postponed due to the intentional burning of garbage in the center of the voting point. Nuns of the Patronato San José de Tarbes denounced that voters who tried to participate were threatened by colectivos, and that the center had to be moved to another location. Also in the morning, armed civilians entered the voting point La Cañada, in San Juan parish, pointed at the coordinator of the voting center and took away a table during the beginning of the process, firing several shots.

== Prominent groups ==
There were between 20 and 100 different colectivo groups in Venezuela as of 2014, with the most prominent groups being the Tupamaros, La Piedrita, Tres Raices, Frente Francisco de Miranda, Alexis Vive, and Ciudad Socialista Frente 5 de Marzo, In 2018, InSight Crime reported 46 groups in the 23 de Enero barrio alone. They control about 10% of Venezuelan cities, and operate in 16 Venezuelan states; Velasco says they number 5,000 to 7,000 individuals nationwide as of 2019. InSight Crime says that Tres Raíces and Frente 5 de Marzo are closely linked with Venezuela's security forces. Tres Raíces is also "one of the better armed" with members also working government jobs for SEBIN (Intelligence), DGCIM (military counterintelligence), FAES (police special action force) or municipal police.

=== La Piedrita ===
Location of prominent colectivos in the Capital District.

La Piedrita colectivo is one of the most influential in Caracas, specifically in 23 de Enero barrio where it has its roots dating to 1985 with founders Carlos Ramírez and Valentín Santana. La Piedrita formally organized when Bolivarian Circles were established by Chávez in Venezuela, and since then, has been described as a colectivo that is one of "the most violent in the country". La Piedrita was also headed by Lina Ron, who at the time of her leadership stated that thousands of Bolivarian Circles such as her own were "armed to the teeth". Ron had a connection with Diosdado Cabello from as early as 2002 when Cabello was the key supporter of Ron. Also, Cabello had supposedly mediated between La Piedrita and the Tupamaros when they had a conflict in 2010.

=== Tupamaros ===
The Revolutionary Tupamaro Movement (Tupamaro) is a Marxist-Leninist colectivo and political organization in Venezuela. Several Tupamaros participate in peaceful movements while some believe the "idea of armed struggle as a means to gain power". Chávez's government had an "ambiguous" relationship with the Tupamaros, who helped manage social programs, such as child care and drug rehabilitation centers, and promoted political participation; however, the Tupamaros' involvement in vigilante justice in high crime areas that the police force often avoided led to rifts with the federal government, which resorted on occasions to using the military to deal with the groups when they clashed with police. The Tupamaros are known to "cleanse" neighborhoods of criminals: if repeated warnings to criminals to leave an area fail, they often resort to murder using "death squads", though some claim that these measures are taken to remove competition in the area. During the 2014 Venezuelan protests, Tupamaros worked with the Venezuelan National Guard to attack protesters, with videos and pictures being uploaded to social networks.

== Funding and resources ==
=== Monetary ===
Colectivos were initially funded by the Bolivarian government, but became less dependent on the government, by funding themselves through crimes such as drug trafficking and extortion. Gunson states that some funding for colectivos comes from demanding payment for protection and requiring members to pay fees. According to The New York Times, colectivos "control vast territory across Venezuela, financed in some cases by extortion, black-market food and parts of the drug trade as the government turns a blind eye in exchange for loyalty". The Washington Post says some colectivos "have been put in charge of the distribution of government food packages in poor areas—giving them control over hungry neighborhoods.

In 2018, InSight Crime reported that the colectivos have diverse income sources—both legal and illegal. Some run legal, profitable businesses, but also receive government funds, largely through the profitable venture of distributing food through government concessions. One Tupamaro leader told InSight Crime that trafficking food and medicine is as profitable as drug-running, while less risky. InSight Crime also learned that colectivos are running "clandestine casinos".

Some colectivos, such as the Tupamaros, have formal links with the Venezuelan government and politics, with over 7,000 individuals on the Caracas payroll since 2008. Stratfor says that Diosdado Cabello, Freddy Bernal and Eliezer Otaiza, have been implicated in directing colectivos or helping fund them. Colectivos also receive funds from government funding for community projects. Velasco states that colectivos "receive government funding through both formal and informal channels, including slush funds the government doles out to different sectors" and also have "personal ties between members and government officials to access resources".

=== Weapons ===
El Pais stated that the Venezuelan government directly arms colectivos with weapons. Velasco believes that the same formal and informal methods of receiving funds is used for weapons. These methods include being armed and trained in formal government militias or working as security and bodyguards. Despite the Venezuelan government's statements saying that only official authorities can carry weapons for the defense of Venezuela, colectivos are armed with automatic rifles such as AK-47s, submachine guns, fragmentation grenades, and tear gas. In 2025, after operation Absolute Resolve, some Colectivos are seen carrying MPi-KMS-72 assault rifles during patrols, the East German variant of the AKMS assault rifle.

=== Crime ===
Colectivos sometimes provide protection from crime in some neighborhoods they are committed to, though some neighborhoods report that colectivos attack neighbors themselves. As colectivos attempted to gain independence from the government, they began "controlling organized crime like drug trafficking in Caracas barrios. Some colectivos patrol the 23 de Enero barrio on motorcycles, masked and armed, supposedly to protect the neighborhood from criminals such as drug dealers. According to ABC News, "it is widely believed that colectivos kill drug traffickers who do not obey their orders".

According to the International Crisis Group, colectivos may be involved in drug trafficking, arms dealing, and car theft. Phil Gunson, a freelance reporter for foreign media, states that, "It's no secret that many colectivos engage in criminal activities." Gunson reported that colectivos combat criminal gangs in neighborhoods and take over the previous gang's business in crime and also take over buildings already owned by individuals and collect rent from the owners. Colectivos are thought to be partially responsible for the increase in the Venezuelan murder rate, according to the Metropolitan Observatory on Citizen Security.

An Organization of American States report on human rights violations in Venezuela stated that colectivos murdered at least 131 individuals between 2014 and 2017 during anti-government protests.

=== Education ===
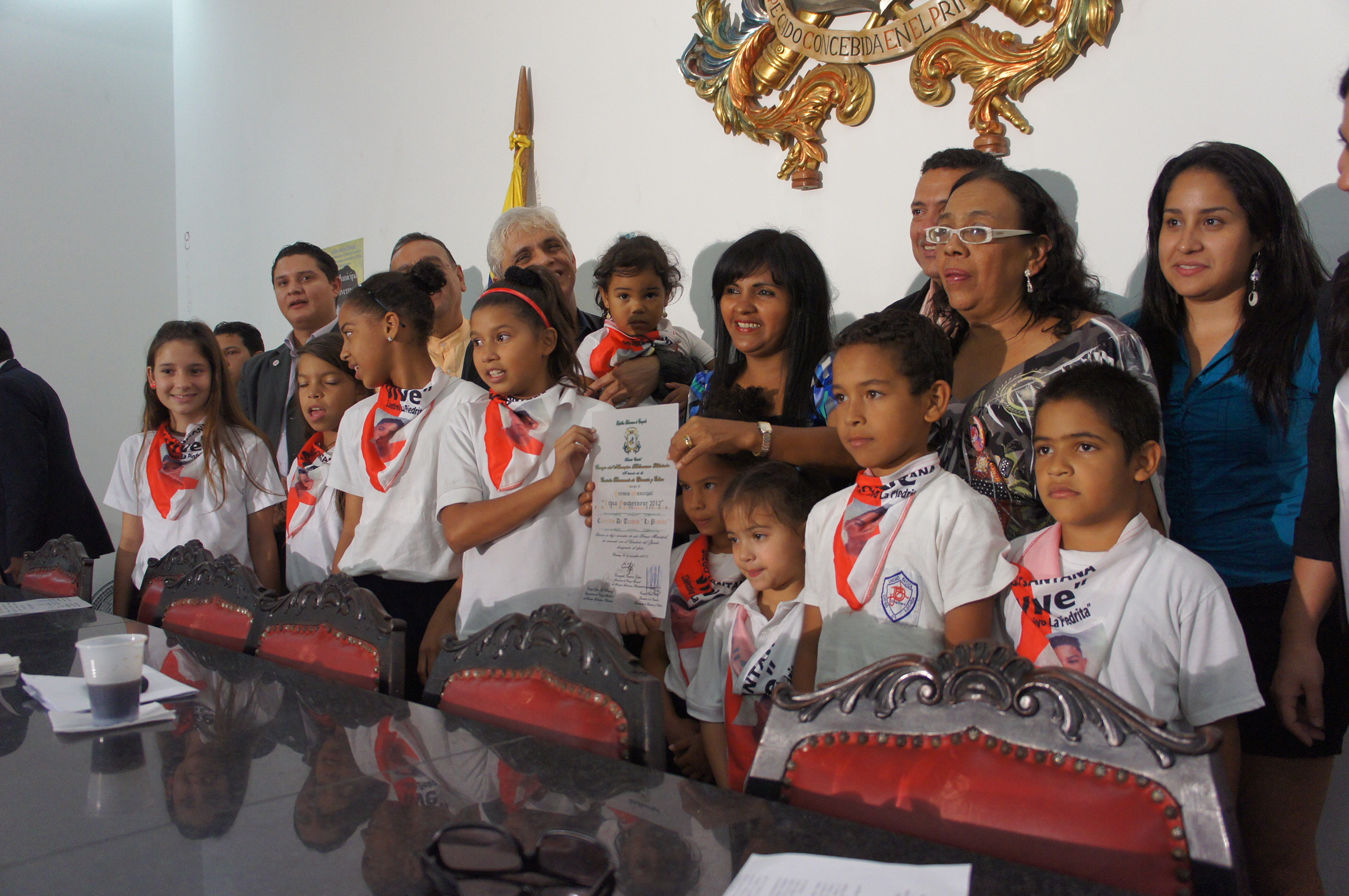
Children of the La Piedrita colectivo receiving awards at the Palacio Municipal de Caracas.

The president of the School of Teachers in Táchira, Javier Tarazona, stated that the Venezuelan government encouraged the participation of guerrillas and colectivos in schools and that their involvement "promotes violence, confrontation and, if necessary, war".

The president of the Venezuelan Chamber of Private Education, María Teresa Hernández, declared in 2014 that Resolution 058 passed in 2012 by the government was unconstitutional and that it "seeks for colectivos with political projects of the ruling party to be directly involved in public and private schools". She stated that schoolchildren are "very easy to manipulate" and need to develop political beliefs on their own. Article 102, for example, states that "Education, is a public service, and is grounded on the respect for all currents of thought".

== See also ==
- Baltagiya
- Basij
- Cartel of the Suns
- Committees for the Defense of the Revolution
- Communes
- Dignity Battalions
- International Criminal Court investigation in Venezuela
- Hilltop Youth
- La Piedrita
- List of designated terrorist groups
- Red Guards (China)
- Titushky
- Tonton Macoute
- Triad (organised crime)#Chinese government connections
- Tupamaro (Venezuela)
- Units of Battle Hugo Chávez
- Venezuela and state-sponsored terrorism
