= Tupamaro (Venezuela) =

Political party in Venezuela

Revolutionary Movement Tupamaro Movimiento Revolucionario Tupamaro
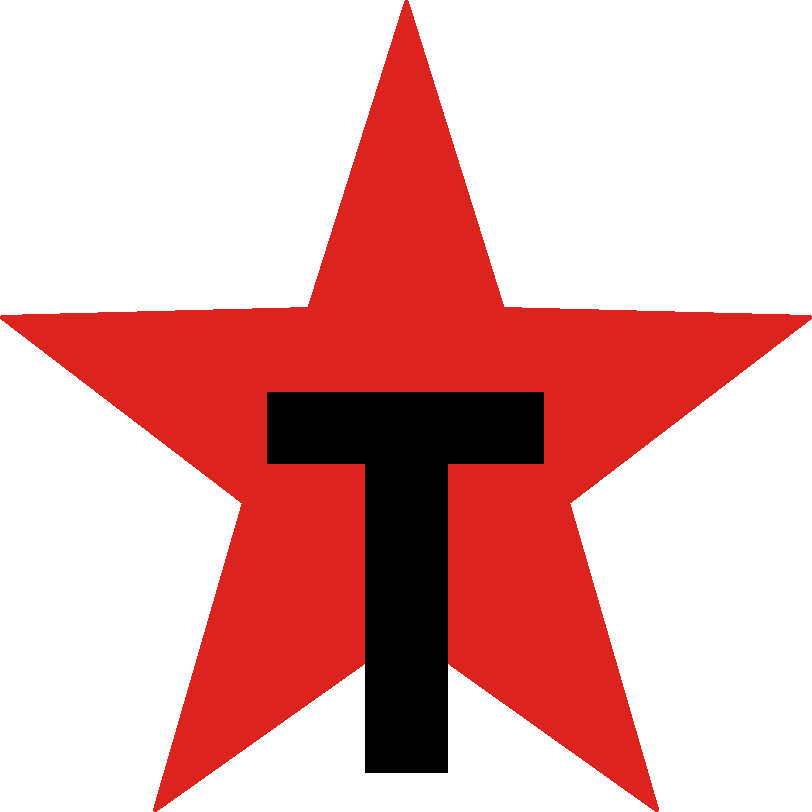
- Leader: Williams Benavides
- Founded: 1979
- Headquarters: Caracas
- Ideology: Communism; Marxism-Leninism; Guevarism; Foco theory; Left-wing nationalism; Revolutionary socialism
- Political position: Far-left
- National affiliation: Popular Revolutionary Alternative (faction); Great Patriotic Pole (faction)
- Colors: Red, Black
- National Assembly: 7 / 277

Party flag

Website
- www.tupamaro.org.ve

Revolutionary Movement Tupamaro
- Country: Venezuela
- Ideology: Communism; Marxism–Leninism
- Political position: Far-left
- Part of: Great Patriotic Pole; Colectivos

Revolutionary Movement Tupamaro (Spanish: Movimiento Revolucionario Tupamaro, MRT), often shortened to Tupamaro, is a far-left Marxist-Leninist communist party and one of the most prominent colectivos in Venezuela. Several Tupamaros participate in peaceful movements while some believe in the "idea of armed struggle as a means to gain power." The group supports the National Liberation Army (ELN) and allegedly had ties with Revolutionary Armed Forces of Colombia (FARC).

== History ==
After the end of the dictatorship of General Marcos Perez Jimenez, the Caracas area known as "el 23 de Enero" that was occupied by his wealthy officials was then taken over by poor squatters. Since then, the area has been described as a "hot bed of radicalism" and that residents have "a resistance mentality". When the Tupamaro in Uruguay were being targeted by the Uruguayan government, some of the Uruguayan members supposedly settled "el 23 de Enero". The Venezuelan Tupamaros have at least ideological links to the Tupamaros in Uruguay, who took the name of Tupac Amaru, the last Incan leader of Peru, who was executed by Spanish authorities in 1572 for opposing colonial rule. In the 1970s and 1980s, people who would later join the Tupamaros were allegedly taking part in guerrilla activities and performing vigilante actions during a period of rising crime in Venezuela.

=== Founding ===
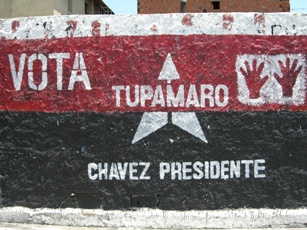
Tupamaros political art showing support for Hugo Chávez.

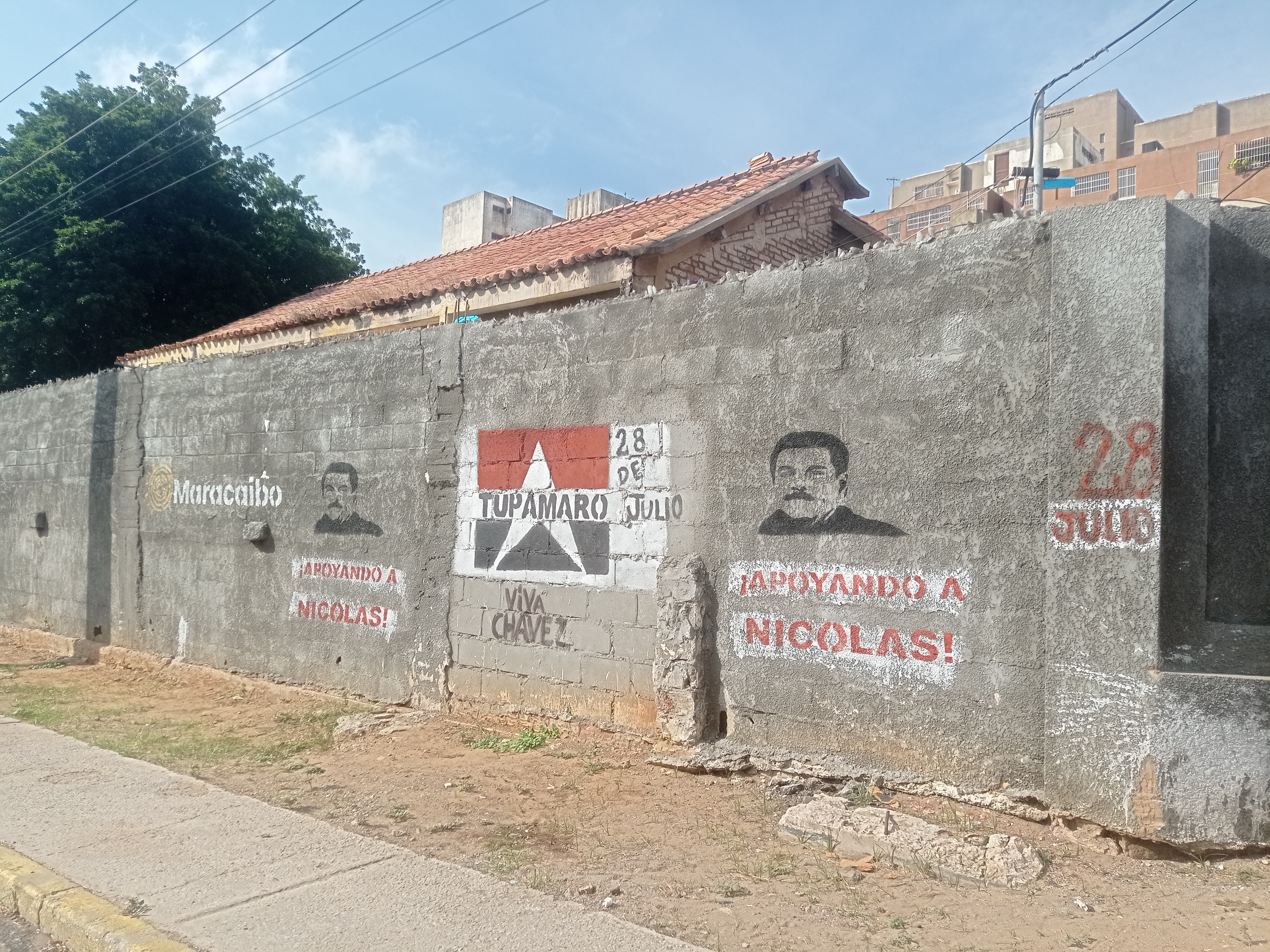
Propaganda in favor of Nicolás Maduro for the 2024 presidential elections in Maracaibo.

The Tupamaros were officially founded in 1992 and allegedly had the chance in prison to come into contact with Hugo Chávez, who was imprisoned for the 1992 Venezuelan coup d'état attempts. Chávez and the Tupamaros allegedly made a deal since Chávez needed protection and the Tupamaros needed resources. The election of Hugo Chávez as President of Venezuela resulted in the consolidation of former opposition groups in support of the new Movement for the Fifth Republic president.

The ideological basis of the movement began to deteriorate. In the first decade of the twenty-first century, the group was denounced by interests and stakeholders who disapproved of its actions, specifically alleged attacks on student movements that did not agree with Hugo Chávez.

== Leadership ==
The original leader of the Tupamaros was Jose Pinto, who was the General Secretary of the MRT. Alberto "Chino" Carías is the current leader of the Tupamaros and calls himself "a Marxist-Leninist guerrilla fighter". He states that he keeps contact with Carlos the Jackal and "has lost count of how many people he's murdered", saying "after ten [murders] you stop feeling remorse".

== Social work ==
With the emergence of Chavez as president, the group also cooperated with the state in administering social programs and promoting political participation. It is involved in after-school programs to keep children out of trouble, child care centers, puppet shows, drug rehabilitation and sports programs. A Tupamaro leader known as Chino, said of the group that "Our greatest accomplishment is having been able to change things through elections."

According to Dr. George W. Knox, executive director of the National Gang Crime Research Center, the Tupamaros are a "gang" and that they use claims like "helping the oppressed peoples" as a ploy that he describes as similar "to Al Capone offering free soup to Chicago's poor".

== Neighborhood actions ==
The group has refused to renounce use of arms to protect communities considered too dangerous even for police officers. In one such example in the high-crime 23 de Enero neighborhood in western Caracas, thieves, muggers or drug dealers who operate in the area run the risk of being executed by Tupamaros patrolling on motorcycles in death squads. A Tupamaro member known as "Mao" insisted neighbourhood criminals are given ample warning before facing execution. "First we give them a warning to get out of the area. If they don't listen, we see them again, this time with 10 of our comrades. If they fail to understand the message, we take matters into our own hands." Though, once again the masks they wear are said to ward off possible retribution from criminals, police or Chávez's political opposition, but they also reinforce an imposing image that critics call a tool of intimidation against Chávez's political opposition. Some have claimed that the Tupamaros execute such criminals because they are competition and they want to have control.

== Political violence ==
Luis Milan, a political science professor at Bolivarian University talked about a riot that began when police opened fire. With the arrival of more Tupamaros to the aid their comrades police, then, asked for military support, signifying the growing potency of the group. He added that "They are becoming a legitimate party, they are participating in the political process. It's a different time now."

=== Court decisions ===
On 8 August 2002, four military officers were being tried for rebellion following the 2002 Venezuelan coup d'état attempt and the Supreme Tribunal of Justice (TSJ) delayed the trial of the officers since judges could not agree on judgements. Following this, President Chávez gave a strong speech on Margarita Island in a "pre-April 11 fashion" calling for supporters to defend "to be ready, at all moments, to defend the Revolution against anyone" while also making statements on not putting pressure on the TSJ judgements. Tupamaros then allegedly attacked a police convoy with high-caliber weapons in a slum area which left one officer dead, one injured and an additional four civilian casualties. Chávez supporters also began to protest in Caracas, closing the street in front of the TSJ and burning tires and another four police officers were reported injured. Tupamaros had also reportedly blocked streets and subways and began to throw Molotov cocktails at police vehicles.

=== Elections ===
Ismach Leon, a campaign manager for the opposition party First Justice said, "The Tupamaros began following me to get me out of Coche (a Caracas slum) because I was campaigning for (conservative candidate) Julio Borges."

Near the conclusion of the 2012 Venezuelan presidential election, Tupamaros leader Alberto Carías stated that if the Venezuelan opposition did not accept a "sure victory" by Hugo Chávez, "that there would 'bullets'". He also stated that the group was "prepared and well armed" and would attack any opposition group that protested.

=== Foreign diplomats ===
In April 2006 following an event where United States Ambassador William Brownfield donated baseball equipment to a poor community in Caracas, Brownfield's convoy was hit, kicked and pelted with objects. The convoy was allegedly attack organized by the Tupamaros with some shouts supposedly heard at the time involving the word "Tupamaros".

=== Protests ===
It was alleged that during the 2014–15 Venezuelan protests, Tupamaros worked with the Venezuelan National Guard to attack protesters that opposed the Bolivarian government.
