= 23 de Enero =

- Parish
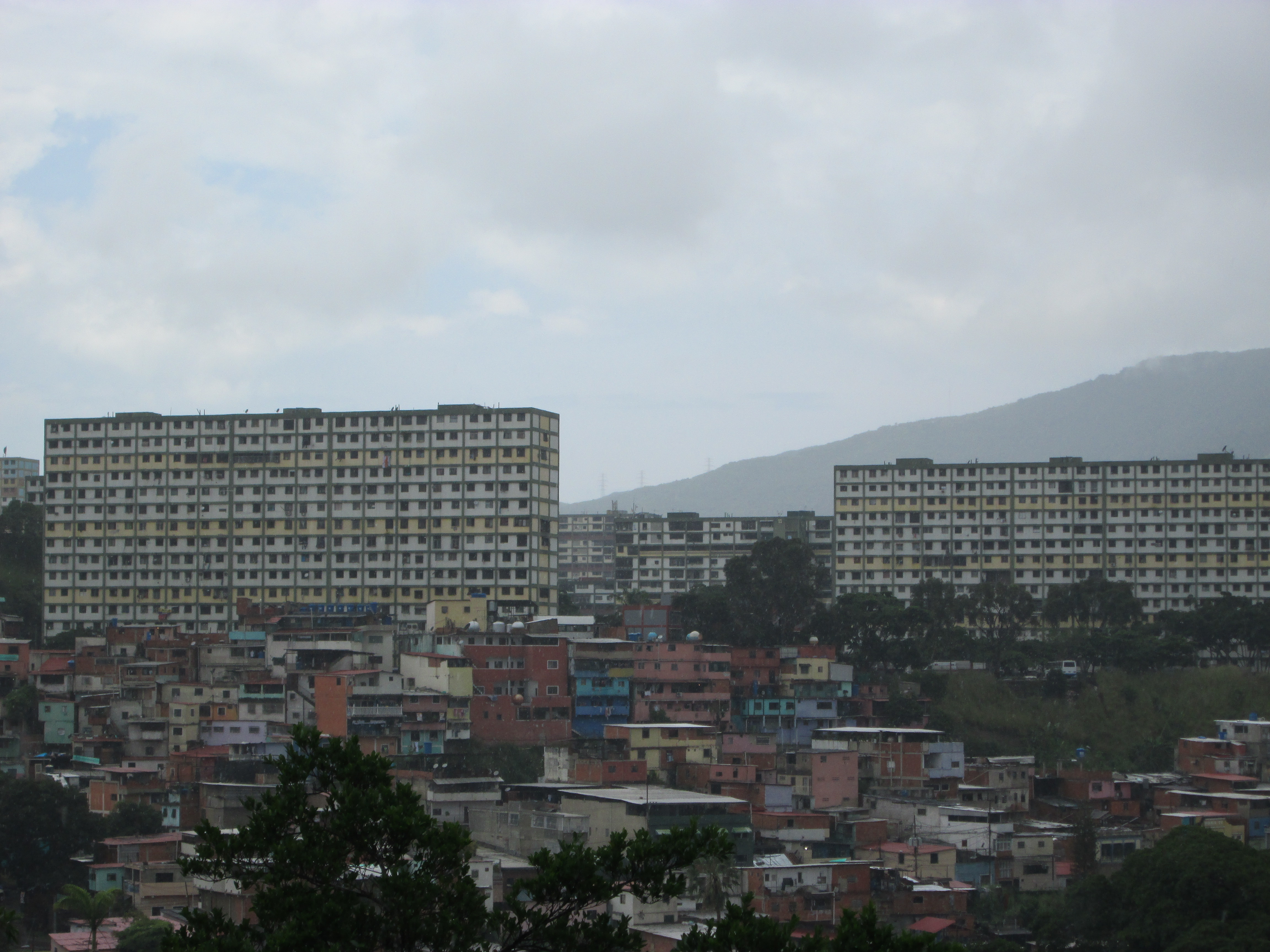
- 23 de Enero in 2013.

- 23 de Enero as seen located in the Libertador municipality.
- Coordinates: 10.5057°N 66.9349°W
- Country: Venezuela
- Federal district: Distrito Capital
- Municipality: Libertador

Area
  - Land: 2.31 km^{2} (0.89 sq mi)

Population (2009)
  - Total: 84,650
  - Density: 36,600/km^{2} (94,900/sq mi)
- Time zone: UTC−4 (VET)
- Website: www.caracas.gov.ve

23 de Enero is a parish located in the Libertador Bolivarian Municipality west of the city of Caracas, Venezuela. The parish receives its name from the date of the 1958 Venezuelan coup d'état which overthrew dictator Marcos Pérez Jiménez.

== History ==
=== Marcos Pérez Jiménez government ===
In the early 1950s, under the government of General Marcos Pérez Jiménez a Housing Unit apartments designed by architect Guido Bermúdez on the model of "Cité Radieuse" Swiss Le Corbusier, also used in the Unit was built Housing Tlatelolco (Mexico) with apartments that were granted to the population of middle and lower classes of Caracas. Initially "Urbanization December 2" would be called (in commemoration of the coup by Marcos Pérez Jiménez). However, the current name was assigned by his successor, Rómulo Betancourt, with the date January 23 (23 de enero) commemorating the overthrow of the general and marking beginning of democracy in Venezuela.

In 1966, it was decided to separate 23 de Enero from the Sucre Parish and place it under the "parish" category, keeping the same name of "23 de Enero". The parish has had a history of social struggle since then.

=== Carlos Andrés Pérez government ===
During the presidency of Carlos Andrés Pérez, the Caracazo, a wave of protests, riots, looting, shootings and massacres, occurred in Caracas beginning on 27 February 1989. 23 de Enero was one of the first areas in Caracas that began to riot and loot. Hugo Chávez also organized the 1992 Venezuelan coup d'état attempts while in 23 de enero.

=== Bolivarian government ===
Since 15 March 2013, the remains of former president Hugo Chávez now rest in the Museum of the Bolivarian Revolution (Cuartel 4 de febrero), also known as the "Montaña Barracks", the very spot where the coup attempt of 1992 was launched.

== Geography ==
It is located northwest of Caracas, nestled in a series of hills, adjacent to the Catia and Sucre parishes. It is a predominantly residential area, with major recreation areas. It is under the municipal government of the Mayor of the Libertador Bolivarian Municipality and the city of Caracas, also being under the regional jurisdiction of the Government of the Capital District, which are in charge of public works in the sectors grouped in 23 de Enero. The security service consists of the Bolivarian National Police (PNB), as well as the Venezuelan Army, which has the Cipriano Castro Barracks in the vicinity of the parish, and the Directorate General of the National Reserve (General Command of the National Militia), with headquarters in the Montana Barracks.

=== Sectors ===
The parish also has separate sectors such as el Observatorio, La Piedrita, La Silsa, Mirador, El Samán, La Cañada, La zona Central, Monte Piedad, Zona F and others.

== Demographics ==
As of 2009, the population of was 84,650. Most of the area is composed of slums of squatters who have remained in the area since the overthrow of Marcos Pérez Jiménez in 1958.

=== Crime ===
23 de Enero has a reputation of violence, robbery, kidnapping and drug trafficking. Colectivos such as the Tupamaros occupy the area where they allegedly partake in or combat crime. Colectivo members patrol the area thoroughly with some possessing armbands with the Venezuelan flag, firearms and radios. Residents claim that colectivos have reduced crime since they use heavy penalties that were allegedly instilled by former president Hugo Chávez.

== Gallery ==
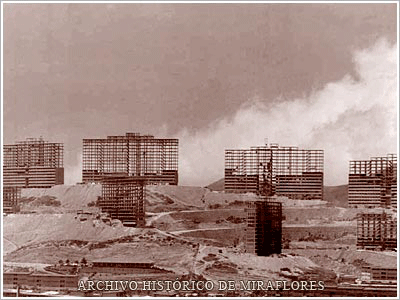
Construction of the complex in 1955.

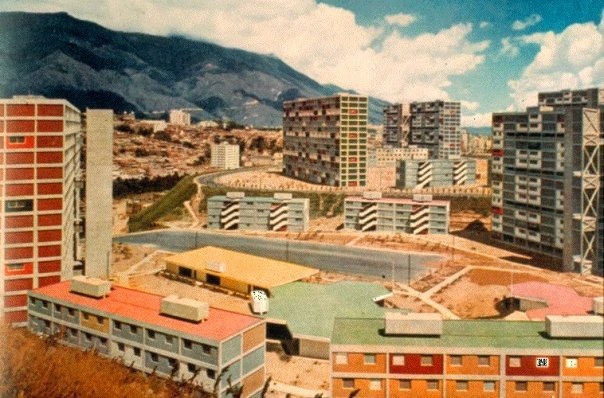
Original plan of the area.

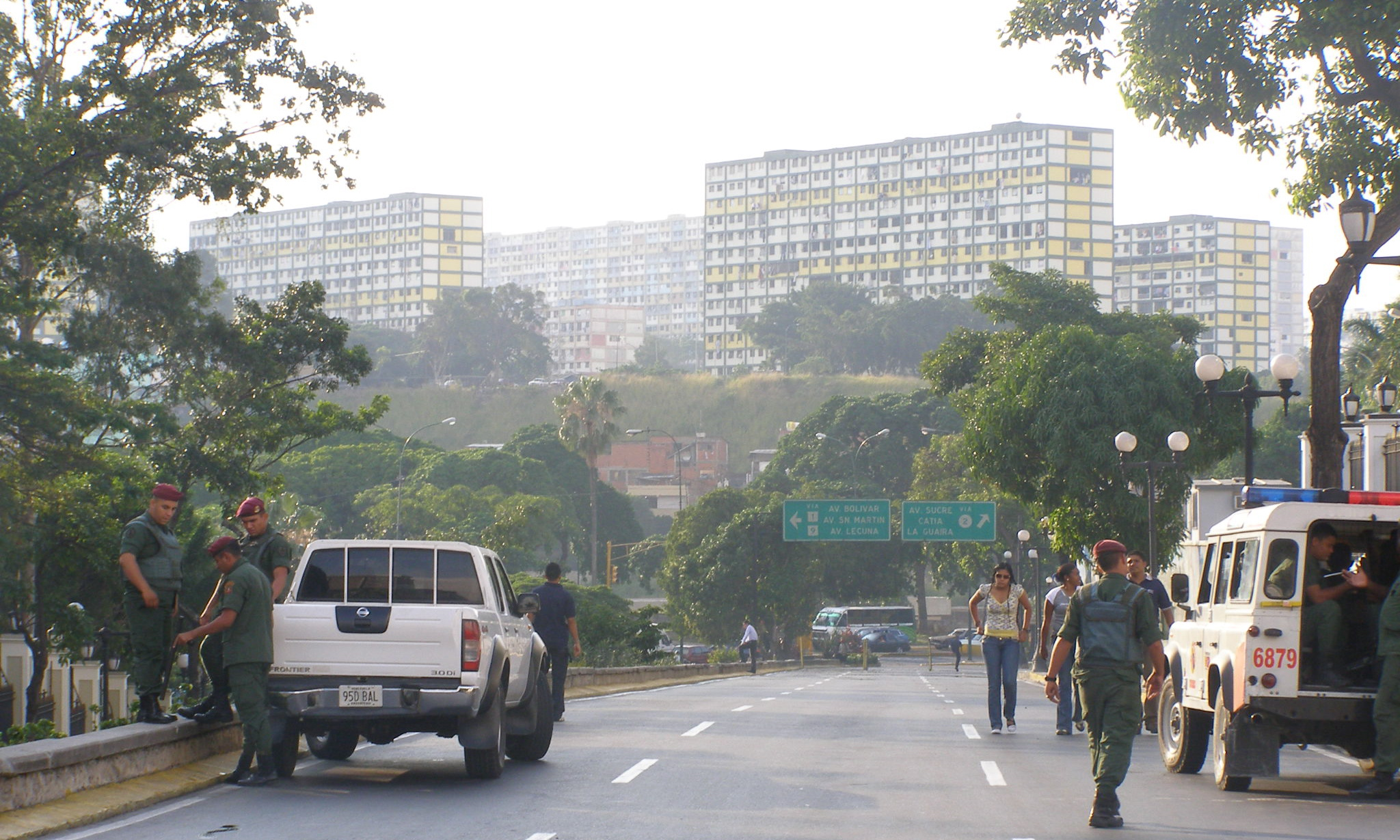
The area as seen from Miraflores Palace.

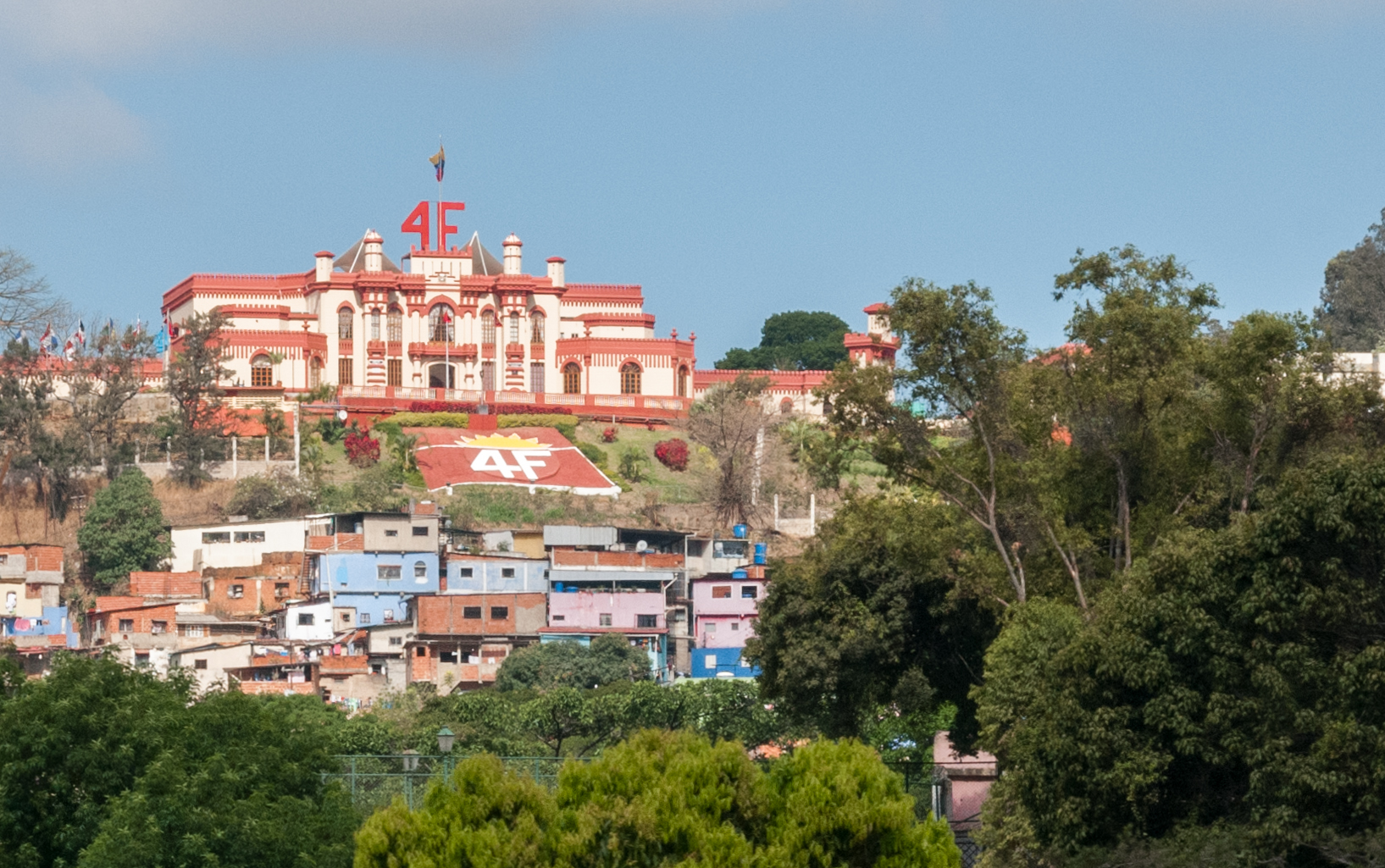
Cuartel de la Montaña
