= Venezuelan communal councils =

Venezuelan government body

In April 2006 the Government of Venezuela passed The Law of Communal Councils (consejos comunales) which empowers local citizens to form neighbourhood-based elected councils that initiate and oversee local policies and projects towards community development. Many Communal Councils became colectivos after they were armed by the Venezuelan government.

Over 19,500 councils were registered throughout the country and billions of dollars have been distributed to support their efforts by the government.

== Structure ==
Communal councils are a group of elected persons from a self-defined residential neighbourhood of about 150 to 400 families in urban areas, or closer to 20 families in rural areas, and potentially 10 in indigenous communities. The principal decision making body of a communal council is the citizens' assembly. The formal functioning committee is composed of the following five units:

- Citizens' Assembly
- Executive Body
- Financial Management Unit
- Unit of Social Oversight (Anti-corruption)
- Community Coordination Collective

All council persons are people within the community elected by the citizens' assembly for a period of 2 years. No person can occupy positions in more than one unit at time.

=== Unit of social oversight ===
The Unit of Social Oversight is a group of five community members elected by the Citizens' Assembly. They are an independent group who monitor and report on the application of council resources and activities towards the community development plan. They are also known as the Anti-corruption Unit.

=== Community Coordination Collective ===
The Community Coordination Collective (composed of one elected spokesperson from the Executive Body, Financial Management Unit & Anti-Corruption Unit respectively) is charged with galvanizing community organization, informing and training community members, and coordinating with the local militia reserves.

== International ==
Communal councils circles exist in other countries and are widespread in Europe, North America, and Australia.

=== Canada ===
In a June 2014 publication by the Center for a Secure Free Society, it was stated that even though some of those circles in Canada had disbanded

=== United States ===
In the United States, there were about 15 circles throughout the United States in 2005. In an article by The Miami Herald, the circles were present in cities such as Cincinnati, Boston, Miami, Salt Lake City, Knoxville and Milwaukee, with the largest organization in Miami having about 185 members.

== Present situation ==
Eight months after the law was passed, over 16,000 councils had already formed throughout the country. 12,000 of them had received funding for community projects – $1 billion total, out of a national budget of $53 billion. The councils had established nearly 300 communal banks, which have received $70 million for micro-loans.

As of March 2007 19,500 councils were registered. The law of Communal Councils was last reaffirmed and updated in November 2009.

== See also ==
- Urban Land Committees
