= Lina Ron =

Venezuelan political leader (1959–2011)

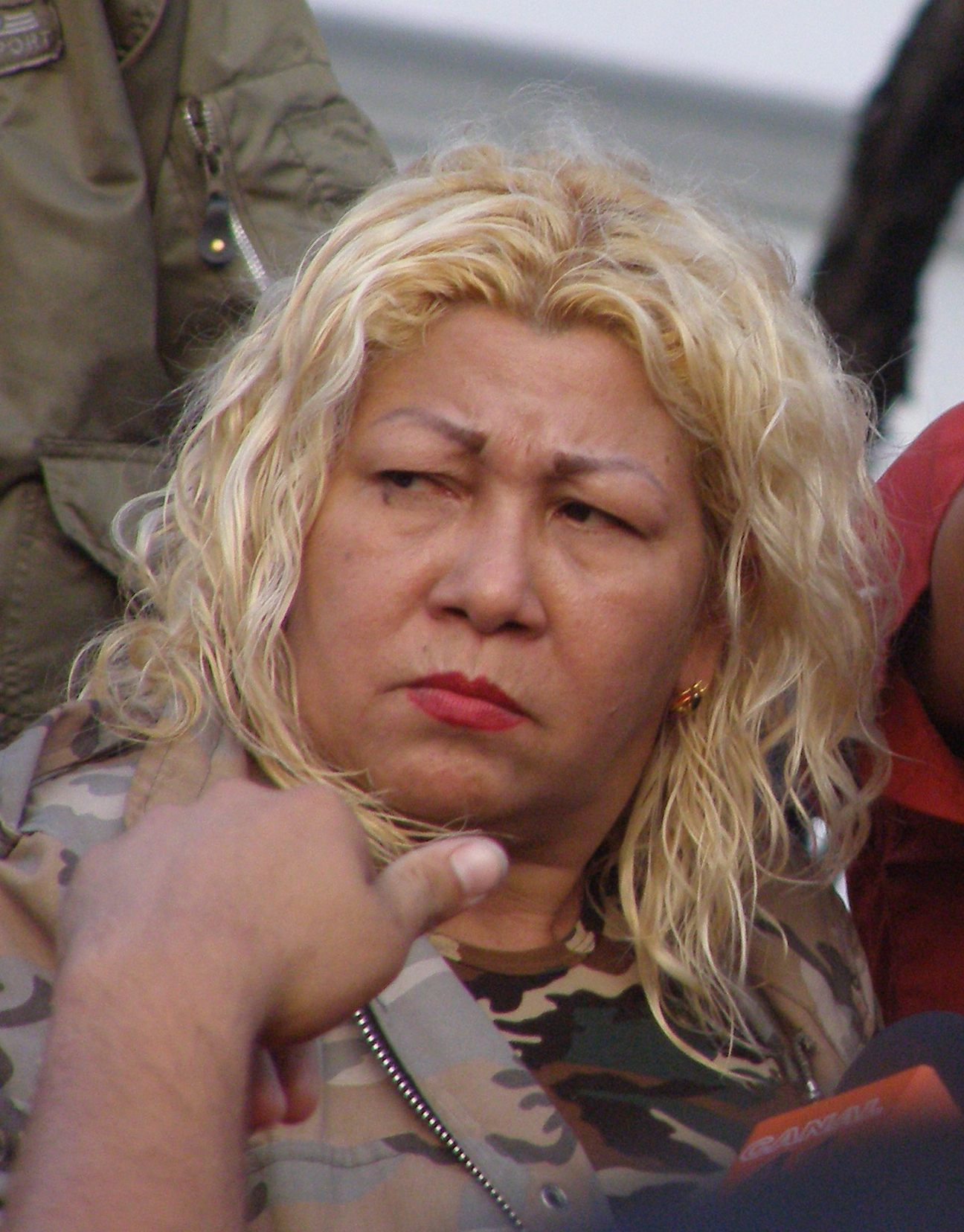
- Born: Ninette Lina Ron Pereira; September 23, 1959; Anaco, Anzoátegui, Venezuela
- Died: March 5, 2011 (aged 51); Caracas

Ninette Lina Ron Pereira (23 September 1959 – 5 March 2011) was a Venezuelan political leader. She was the founder and president of the Venezuelan Popular Unity party, one of the parties which supported President Hugo Chávez. Ron ran one of the Bolivarian Circles. She died of a heart attack in 2011 at the age of 51 and was buried in the South Cemetery of Plaza Andrés Eloy Blanco. President Chávez extolled her as "a true soldier of the people" and a "complete revolutionary."

== Early life ==
Lina Ron was born in Anaco, in the state of Anzoategui on September 23, 1959. She was the fourth child of Manuel Ron Chira, a political leader, and Herminia Pereira. She and her six brothers plus eight cousins were raised by Lina Ron's mother after her father Manuel went to prison after being convicted of murder. She studied medicine at the Central University of Venezuela until the eighth semester, when she dropped out.

== Political career ==
She moved to Caracas at the age of 27 and worked in a shopping mall before becoming a leftist student leader in the Comité de Luchas Populares (CLP), where she demonstrated in favor of students, street vendors and squatters. She dyed her hair platinum-blond and played an important role as an activist.

=== Political approach ===
Ron said she fought on behalf of the most dispossessed so that they would not become eternal victims of "the oligarchy and imperialism in Venezuela". She became famous in 2002, when she was part of the demonstration in front of the U.S. embassy during the attempted coup against Hugo Chávez.

Ron was very aggressive and volatile in her radical political approach, to the point that even Chávez called her "uncontrollable", and she labelled herself as the "ugly part" of the "revolution". She was also a leader of one of the Bolivarian Circles called La Piedrita stating that such circles were "armed to the teeth". In 2008, she and her companions had attacked the Archbishop's Palace in Caracas and irascibly evicted people who were there, and had adamantly demanded the support of the Catholic Church to the cause of the revolution. In 2009, Ron led an armed attack on Globovisión, where she and attackers threw tear gas into the headquarters of the news organization that left injured multiple individuals inside and threatened its security with firearms. She then went to jail for three months following the 2009 attack and was allegedly recommended to be placed on the United States' Visas Viper for suspected terrorists due to the violent actions.

== Death ==
On 5 March 2011, Andrés Izarra, then head of the Ministry of Communication and Information announced that Lina Ron died of "coronary obstructive disease of long standing". Officials of the Bello Monte morgue in Caracas ruled that she did not die of a reported medicine overdose or intoxication since there were no leaks found on any of her organs. Following her death, President Chávez stated that she "was a sharp sword and living flame of popular socialist Bolivarian Revolution" and that "with the departure of Lina Ron the sword sharpens more and the flame grows more".
