= Resistencia =

Resistencia may refer to:

- Resistencia, Chaco, a city in Argentina
- Resistencia International Airport (RES), an airport in Chaco Province, Argentina
- Resistencia Civil, a libertarian political movement in Venezuela
- La Resistencia (Venezuela), a Venezuelan opposition protest defence movement
- La Resistencia (film), a 1972 Argentine film
- La Resistencia (gang), Mexican gang
- La Resistencia Dios, Patria y Familia, a Peruvian neofascist far-right group that promotes Fujimorism
- Resistencia S.C., a football club in Paraguay
- Resistencia (horse), a Thoroughbred racehorse
- La Resistencia, Spanish TV talk-show
