= Nína Sæmundsson =

Icelandic and American sculptor, painter (1892–1965)

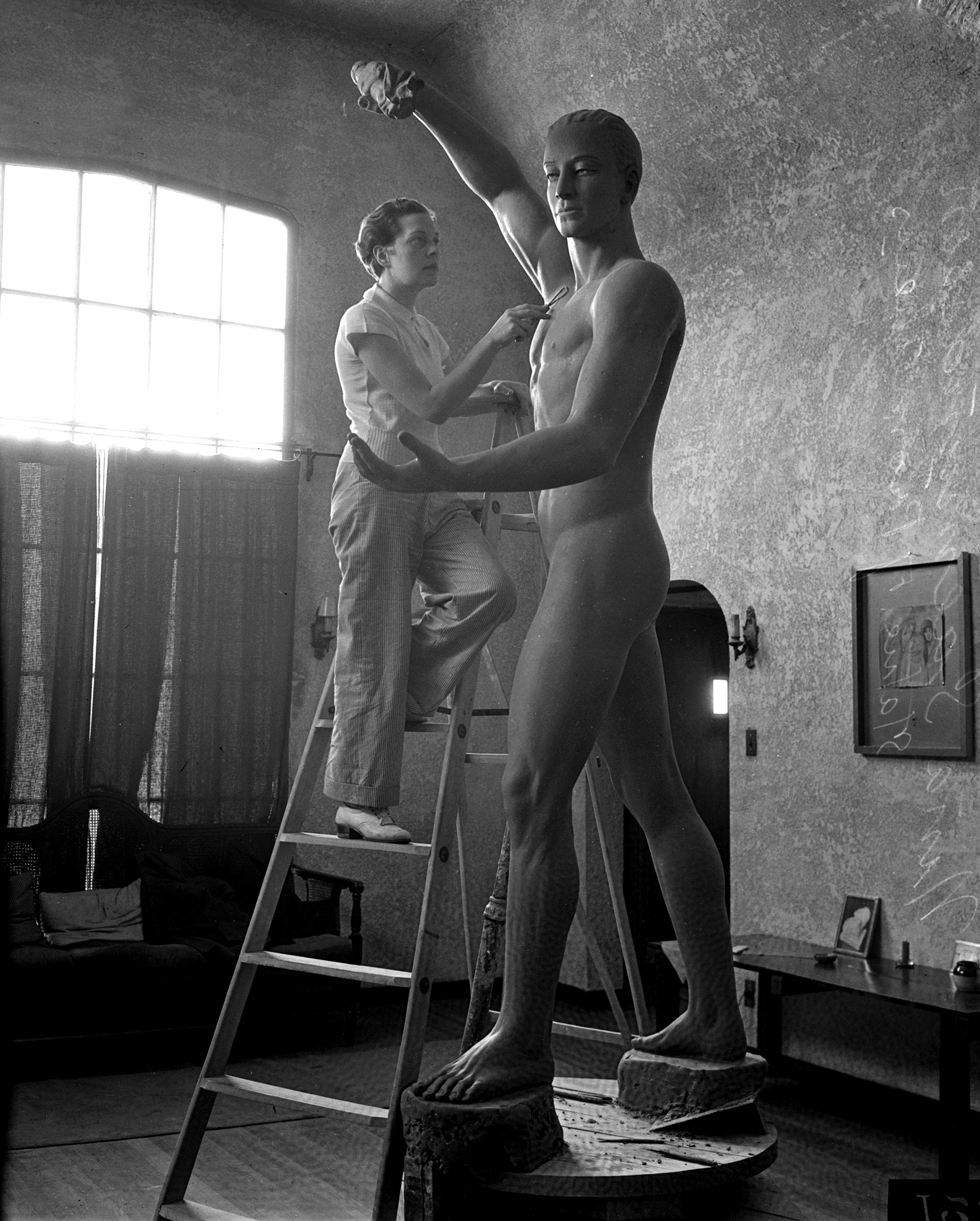
- Born: Jónína Sæmundsdóttir; 22 August 1892; Fljótshlíð, Iceland
- Died: 29 January 1965 (aged 72); Reykjavík, Iceland
- Other names: Nina Saemundsson, Nína Sæmundsdóttir
- Years active: 1930s–1960s
- Known for: Sculptures, paintings

Nína Sæmundsson, or Nina Saemundsson (born Jónína Sæmundsdóttir; 22 August 1892 – 29 January 1965) was an Icelandic and American artist, known for her sculptures and paintings. She was active from the 1920s until the 1960s in Los Angeles, New York City, and Iceland. She worked as a New Deal artist within the Federal Art Project in the 1930s.

== Early life and education ==
Jónína Sæmundsdóttir was born on 22 August 1892 in the Fljótshlíð region in South Iceland, near Hvolsvöllur. She was raised on the farm Nikulásarhús, but the family moved to the city of Reykjavík when she was a teenager. Saemundsson attended the Royal Danish Academy of Fine Arts in Charlottenborg Palace, studying under artists Julius Schultz and Einar Ultzon-Frank.

Nína was engaged to footballer Gunnar Thorsteinsson, the younger brother of the artist Muggur, from 1918 until his death from pulmonary tuberculosis in May 1921. After graduating in 1920, she traveled around Europe. Sæmundsson initially moved to New York City in 1926.

== Career and late life ==
By the mid-1930s, Sæmundsson moved to the Hollywood area of Los Angeles. For many years she lived with screenwriter Polly James on Camrose Drive near the Hollywood Bowl. She taught classes at Henry Lovins' Hollywood Art Center School.

Saemundsson became popular as a portrait artist for celebrities. Actress Hedy Lamarr posed for a bust sculpture by Sæmundsson, which was displayed at the 1939 New York World's Fair with the Swedish American Art Society of the West and it won a first place award.

Sæmundsson worked as a set decorator building sculptures for the Albert Lewin film, The Moon and Sixpence (1942).

She spent the last years of her life painting. In 1955, she moved back to Iceland. She died 29 January 1965.

== Public art work ==
Sæmundsdóttir has many public art works, this list is by ascending date.

- Mother's love statue (1928), Mæðragarður (Mothers Garden), Reykjavík, Iceland
- The Spirit of Achievement statue (1931), a thin and tall winged nymph, placed over the entrance of the Waldorf Astoria Hostel, New York City, New York, United States
- Prometheus Bringing Fire to Earth statue (1935), an 8 foot bronze of Prometheus raising a torch to a globe of the world, MacArthur Park, Los Angeles, California, United States. This work was created as part of Works Progress Administration's Federal Art Project.
- Leif Erikson bust (1936), intersection of Fern Dell Drive and Los Feliz Boulevard entrance to Griffith Park, Los Angeles, California, United States
- The Mermaid statue (also known as Hafmeyjan, 1966), Tjörnin lake, Reykjavík, Iceland

== See also ==
- List of sculptors
- List of Icelandic visual artists
- List of Icelandic women artists
