= The Redhead from Wyoming =

1953 film by Lee Sholem

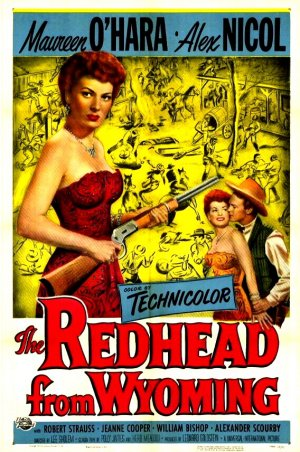
- Film poster by Reynold Brown
- Directed by: Lee Sholem
- Written by: Polly James; Herb Meadow
- Produced by: Leonard Goldstein
- Starring: Maureen O'Hara; Alex Nicol
- Cinematography: Winton Hoch
- Edited by: Milton Carruth
- Color process: Technicolor
- Production company: Universal Pictures
- Distributed by: Universal Pictures
- Release dates: January 8, 1953 (New York City); April 9, 1953 (United States)
- Running time: 81 minutes
- Country: United States
- Language: English
- Box office: $1.1 million (US)

The Redhead from Wyoming is a 1953 American Western film produced by Leonard Goldstein and directed by Lee Sholem. It stars Maureen O'Hara as a saloon proprietress who becomes embroiled in a range war and Alex Nicol as the sheriff who tries to prevent it. The supporting cast includes William Bishop as a politician who provokes the war and Alexander Scourby as a prominent cattle rancher.

== Plot ==
The film begins with scenes of life in Wyoming Territory, where new settlers join the cattle business by finding stray, unbranded cattle, called "mavericks", on public land. The narrator explains that established ranchers use the "Maverick Act" against the settlers, while "sharp-witted men" take advantage of the resulting conflict. After this introduction, Jim Averell is shown exhorting settlers to elect him governor to defend them against cattle barons such as Reece Duncan. When Averell's speech is over, the famous stage performer Kate Maxwell arrives with a group of showgirls. Averell has arranged for Kate to operate both a cattle-buying business and a saloon. Duncan warns Kate that he will kill anyone caught stealing cattle on his land, and Sheriff Stan Blaine warns her of an impending war over the cattle business.

The tension between Duncan and the settlers rises as the settlers search for mavericks on Duncan's land and outlaws hired by Averell steal Duncan's cattle. Averell designed the "K-M" brand for Kate's cattle business in such a way that her branding iron completely covers Duncan's "bar double check" brand when applied directly over it. When Averell explains this trick to Kate, he makes it clear to her that she will be hanged as a rustler if she informs the authorities, and Duncan refuses her offer to support him against Averell.

Meanwhile, unknown gunfighters assemble in the nearby hills, and one of them shoots a settler. After Duncan attempts to stop a cattle roundup organized by Averell and the settlers, one of his men is killed, with Kate's branding iron left near the body. To further increase the tension, Averell offers Duncan his support against the settlers immediately after inciting their anger against Duncan. Averell's plan is to ignite a cattle war and promote his own political career by providing leadership once the war has begun.

However, Blaine discovers Averell's plan. After Blaine and Kate have explained it to their men, they stage a fake war, and Blaine forces Averell to signal his men. When the outlaws ride into town, they begin a gunfight against both Duncan's men and the settlers. After Averell shoots Blaine, Kate catches him stealing money from the saloon, and when he tries to shoot her, she and Blaine kill him. After the fight, Blaine prepares to leave town, but Kate persuades him to stay with her. The film ends as they ride away to inspect some farmland for a new home.

== Cast ==
- Maureen O'Hara as Kate Maxwell, a stage performer with a checkered history in Texas
- Alex Nicol as Sheriff Stan Blaine, a drifter whose family was killed in a Texas cattle war when he was a boy
- William Bishop as Jim Averell, a scheming politician who once betrayed Kate in Texas
- Robert Strauss as "Knuckles" Hogan, Kate's bodyguard
- Alexander Scourby as Reece Duncan, an established cattle rancher
- Palmer Lee as Hal Jessup, a young settler
- Jack Kelly as Sandy
- Jeanne Cooper as Myra, a showgirl, Hal's sweetheart
- Dennis Weaver as Matt Jessup, a settler
- Stacy Harris as Chet Jones

== Production ==
The film was called Cattle Kate based on an original story by Polly Bishop. (In December 1949 Hal Wallis announced he wanted to make a biopic of the Wyoming pioneer Ellen Watson called Cattle Kate starring Barbara Stanwyck but this appears to have become The Furies.)

Maureen O'Hara signed in April 1952. Hugh O'Brien was to play the lead but he went into The Great Companions instead. Alex Nicol was cast in the male lead. Filming started 10 May 1952. Many town scenes were filmed in the Gold Rush town of Columbia, Tuolumne County, California, while many outdoors scenes were filmed in the general area. Maureen O'Hara narrowly escaped injury when a gun exploded in the hands of an extra. The title was changed to Redhead from Wyoming in June 1952. Star Maureen O'Hara was under contract to Universal Pictures at the time.
