= Polly James (screenwriter) =

American screenwriter

- Occupations: Screenwriter, TV writer
- Years active: 1944–1959

Polly James was an American screenwriter and TV writer active in the 1940s and 1950s. Much of her work was in the Western genre. For many years she lived with sculptor Nína Sæmundsson on Camrose Drive near the Hollywood Bowl.

She was a member of the Screen Writers Guild.

== Selected filmography ==
=== Television ===
- Sugarfoot (1 episode; 1959)
- Casey Jones (1 episode; 1957)
- The Adventures of Jim Bowie (3 episodes; 1957)
- Annie Oakley (1 episode; 1956)
- The Roy Rogers Show (1 episode; 1956)
- The Adventures of Champion (1 episode; 1956)
- The Millionaire (1 episode; 1955)
- The Gene Autry Show (5 episodes; 1950–52)
- The Lone Ranger (3 episodes; 1949–50)

=== Film ===
- The Redhead from Wyoming (1953)
- The Raiders (1952)
- Mrs. Parkington (1944)
