= Galo Canote =

American artist

- Born: United States
- Other names: Make, MakeOne, LoveGalo
- Occupations: artist; teacher; mentor; food blogger; curator
- Known for: Graffiti art, fine art, mural work, food blogging
- Style: Urban art

Galo Canote (also known as "Make", "MakeOne", and "LoveGalo") is an American artist primarily known for his graffiti and visual art projects. He was born in Los Angeles and lived in Guadalajara during the mid-1980s. Since 2023, he has been based in Guadalajara, Mexico.

== Career ==
At an early age, Galo became involved in art. He later dropped out of commercial art classes and high school, after which graffiti became a significant part of his life.

Shortly after his return to Los Angeles, Galo, along with other crew members and collaborators, worked on the bandshell at MacArthur Park in Los Angeles. The project was directed by Chicana artist Patssi Valdez in collaboration with the Otis College of Art and Design (then known as Otis Parsons School of Design).

Galo later stepped away from the graffiti scene to pursue other professional interests, returning during the 1990s. He has worked as a full-time artist, as well as an art and language teacher and mentor for at-risk youth and juvenile offenders. Organizations he has worked with include Art Share LA, Star Education, and L.A.’s BEST. He has also directed, organized, and curated art exhibitions throughout the Los Angeles area. As an exhibiting artist, his work has appeared in Mexico, Japan, and Taiwan.

In addition to his visual art practice, Galo has been active as a food blogger, particularly focusing on Koreatown in Los Angeles, California.

He has participated as a panelist at institutions including the Museum of Contemporary Art (MOCA), the Los Angeles County Museum of Art (LACMA), and universities such as the Universidad Autónoma Metropolitana (UAM). He has also participated in academic and public programs at the California Institute of the Arts (CalArts).

In 2012, Galo collaborated with French shoe designer Christian Louboutin and Neiman Marcus on a large-scale project on the Sunset Strip, consisting of a billboard measuring approximately 130 feet by 70 feet. As part of the collaboration, he also contributed to window displays and in-store visual installations created to mark Louboutin’s visit to Los Angeles and commemorate 20 Years of Glamour.

In 2023, Galo relocated to Guadalajara, Mexico, where he became more actively involved in the local art scene and began pursuing higher education, as discussed in an interview conducted by Dr. Ricardo Zepeda for the University of Guadalajara–affiliated program Homielens.

Galo has also spoken publicly about his experiences as a migrant in both Los Angeles and Guadalajara, including personal and professional hardship, in interviews with regional media. His participation in live art programming at the Edificio Arroniz, a cultural venue operated by the Secretaría de Cultura Jalisco, was documented by El Diario NTR Guadalajara during coverage of the 3rd Cultural Food Fest organized by the Rhimzone Center.

Galo also conducts guided walking tours in Guadalajara’s historic center that combine cultural history with local gastronomy, including Thee Twilight Tour: Sights, Lights and Bites.

== See also ==
- Street art
