= Henricus Wallace Westlake =

Canadian physician who moved to Los Angeles, California, around 1888

Henricus Wallace Westlake (June 1858 – 12 May 1905) was a Canadian physician who moved to Los Angeles, California, around 1888, settled in the rolling hills west of the city and gave his name to both a municipal park and a neighborhood in the city.

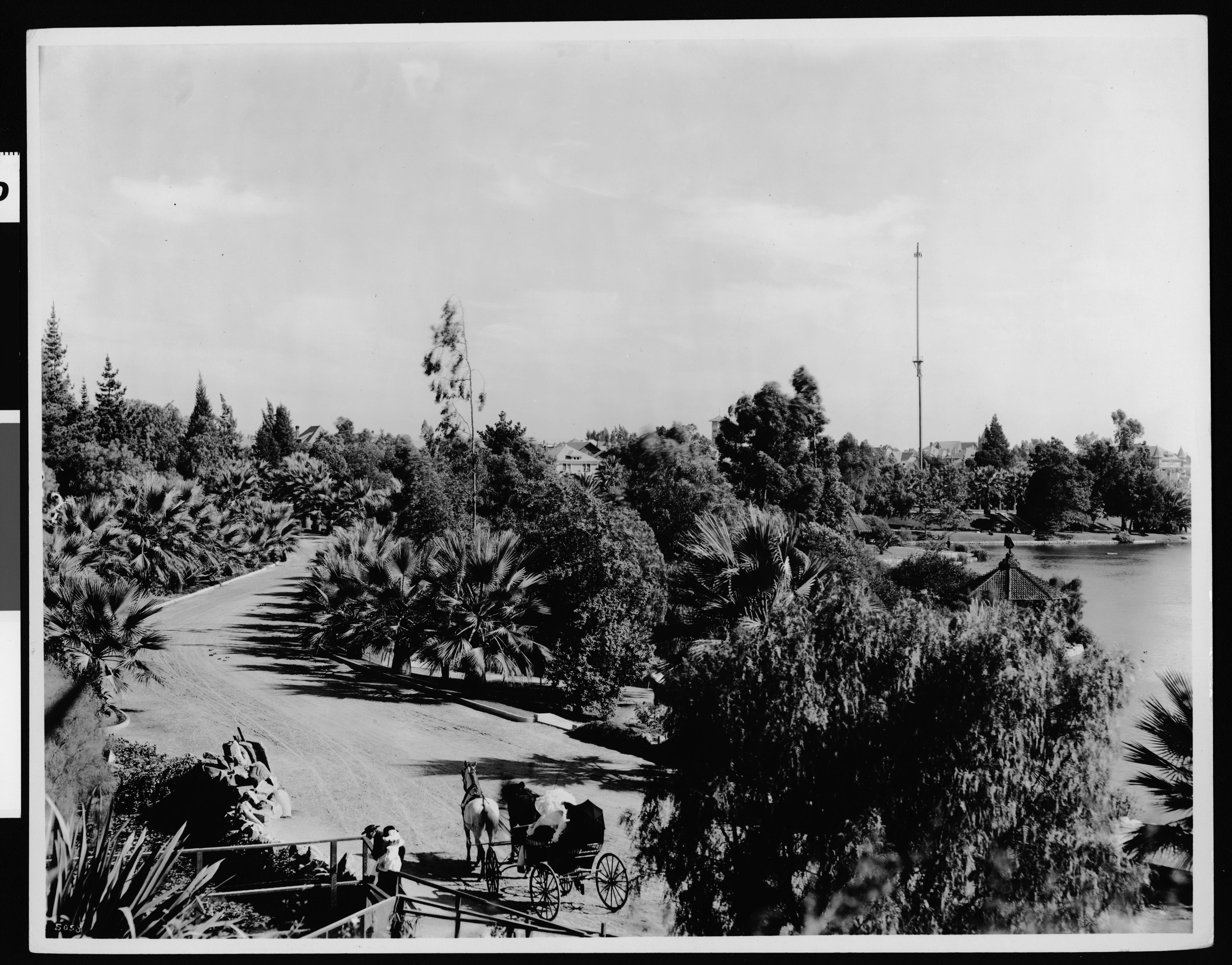
Westlake Park around 1900

Westlake was born in either Canada or England in June 1858. He was a graduate of the medical department of McGill University in Montreal and also earned diplomas in Edinburgh and Vienna. He moved to Los Angeles in 1888, where he pioneered in building a large home on Burlington Avenue in the empty, rolling hills west of the city. He developed a large medical practice and was also president of the California-Corsica Citron Company and the Westlake-Rommel Oil Company, besides owning mining interests in Arizona. He was also the inventor of at least one medical device.

He was known as a generous philanthropist who gave large sums to charities. He donated to the city an "unsightly gully" which in the winter filled with storm water and became stagnant, and the land was later developed into Westlake Park, now known as MacArthur Park.

In 1885 or 1889 he married Fannie Farquhar of Canada, who was his only survivor when he died on May 12, 1905.
