= MacArthur Memorial =

Museum and memorial in Norfolk, Virginia

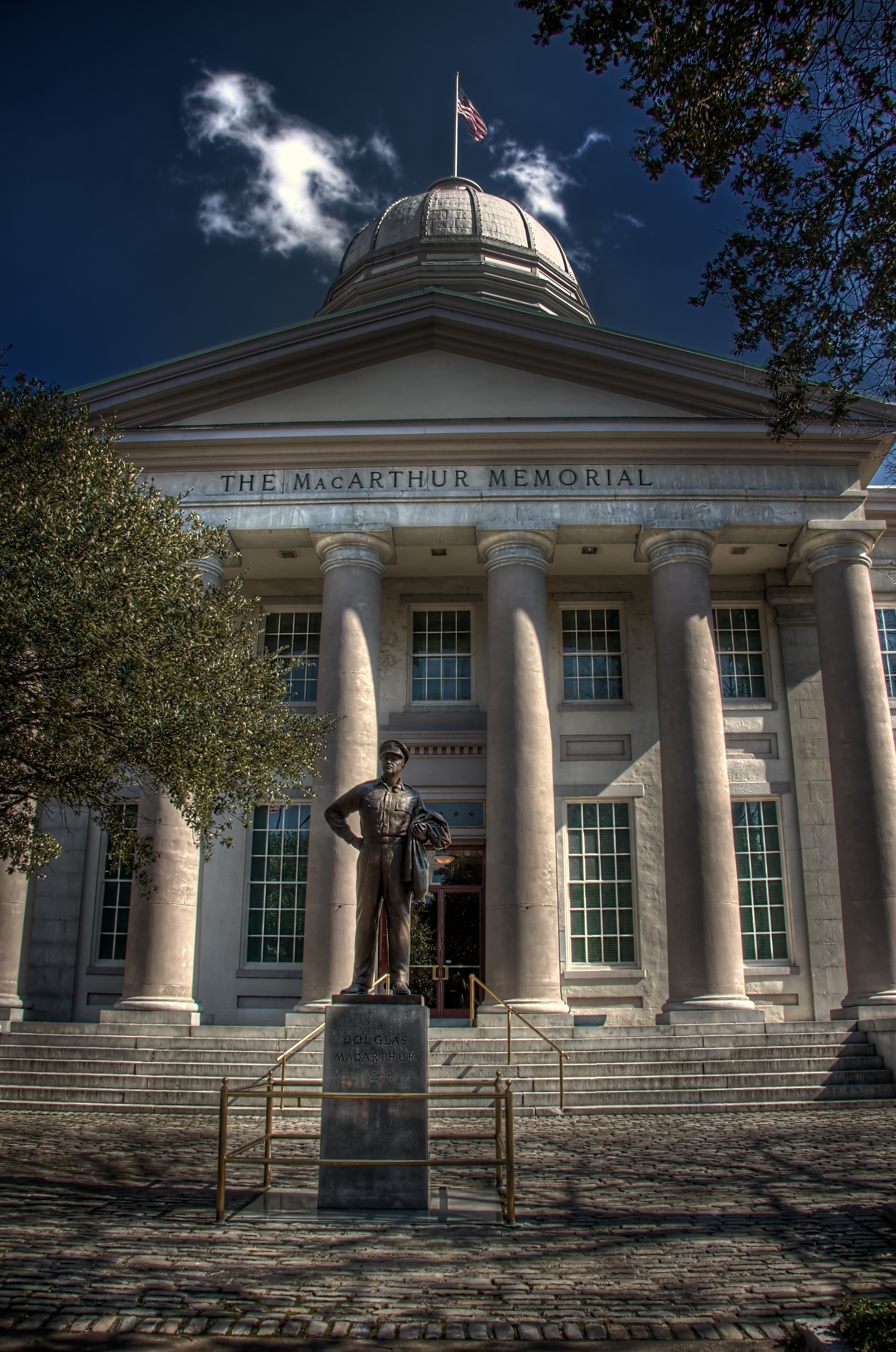

- Location within Virginia
- Established: 1964
- Location: MacArthur Square, 198 Bank Street, Norfolk, Virginia, US
- Coordinates: 36.847701°N 76.288620°W
- Website: http://www.macarthurmemorial.org

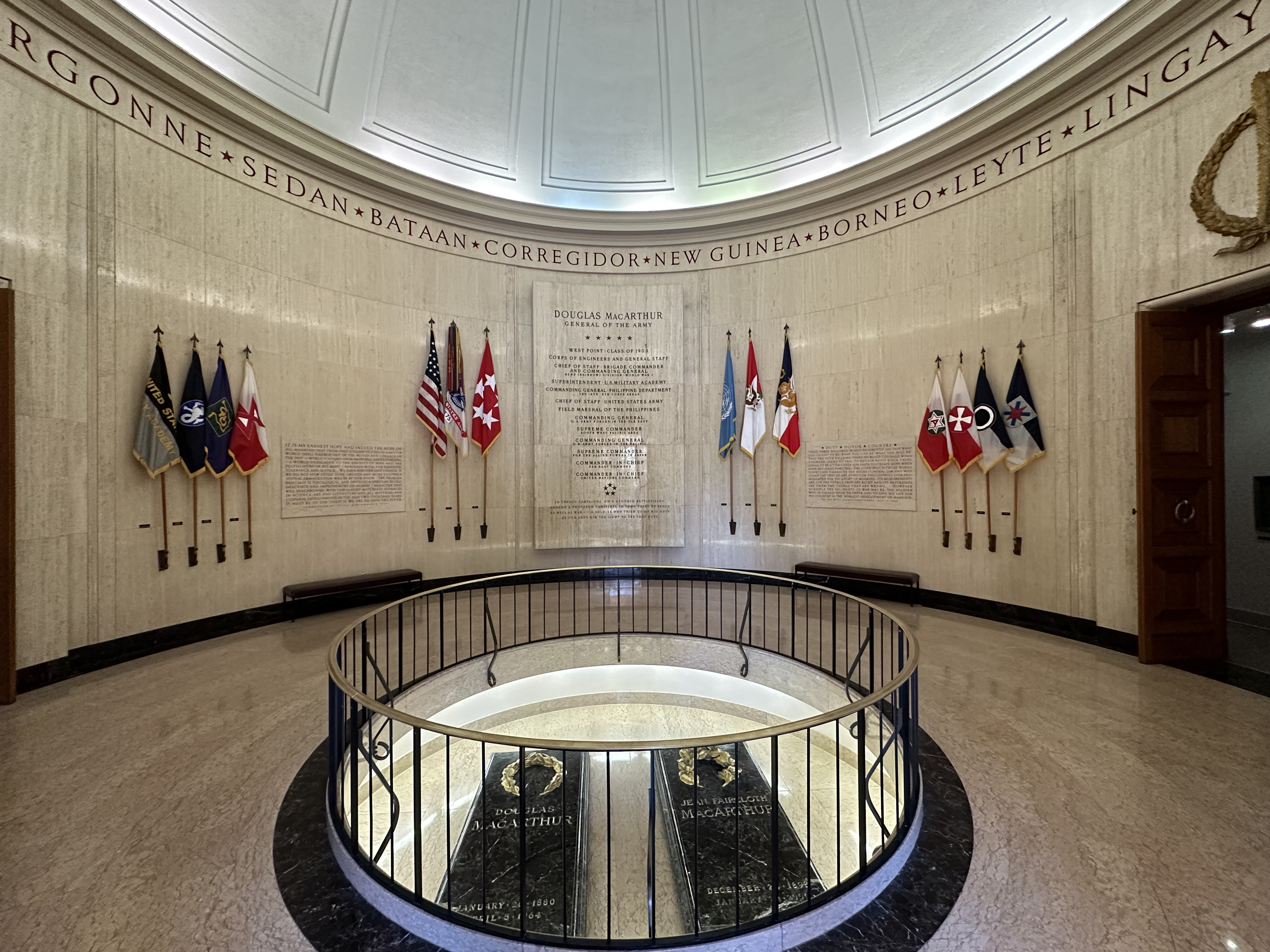
The tomb of Douglas and Jean MacArthur

The MacArthur Memorial is a memorial, museum, and research center about the life of General Douglas MacArthur. It consists of three buildings on MacArthur Square in Norfolk, Virginia.

MacArthur never lived in Norfolk but his mother, Mary Pinkney "Pinky" Hardy MacArthur, was born and raised in Norfolk and he had fond memories of visiting her family home, Riveredge, as a boy. His mother's connection with Norfolk was why he decided to be buried there after visiting Norfolk in 1951 to dedicate a park in honor of his mother on land where Riveredge once stood. The city of Norfolk's government built the memorial in the 1960s and has continued to own, renovate, and operate it due to a promise made between MacArthur and the then mayor of Norfolk, W. Fred Duckworth, in 1960. Although MacArthur had been approached by many cities about his funeral and gravesite plans, Duckworth's offer was the most intriguing one.

MacArthur agreed to turn over all of his papers, medals, and memorabilia to the city of Norfolk and agreed to be buried in Norfolk as long as he and his wife would be buried within the memorial. Duckworth offered the former Norfolk City Hall building as a combined museum and mausoleum to honor MacArthur.

- Memorial – located in the former Norfolk City Hall building, the memorial houses the tomb of General MacArthur and his wife in the rotunda, and the museum that spans nine galleries about his life and career. Exhibits include photos, uniforms, flags, medals, weapons, personal artifacts, paintings, and sculpture. The Memorial also pays tribute to the men and women who served with General MacArthur in World War I, World War II, and the Korean War.
- Visitor Center – includes the MacArthur Memorial Theater showing a 27-minute movie about MacArthur's life, a special exhibit gallery, the general's personal staff car, and other vehicles from World War II, a gift shop, rest rooms, and offices.
- Jean MacArthur Research Center – houses the general's personal archives, memorabilia, and collections, including his trophies, medals, prizes, decorations, uniforms, flags, swords, battle souvenirs, personal papers, along with both official and other documents. The building also includes educational facilities and offices. It is open to researchers by appointment. Admission is free.

== See also ==
- MacArthur Monument – Statue in Los Angeles
- MacArthur Monument (West Point)
