= Prometheus Bringing Fire to Earth =

Statue in Los Angeles, California, U.S.

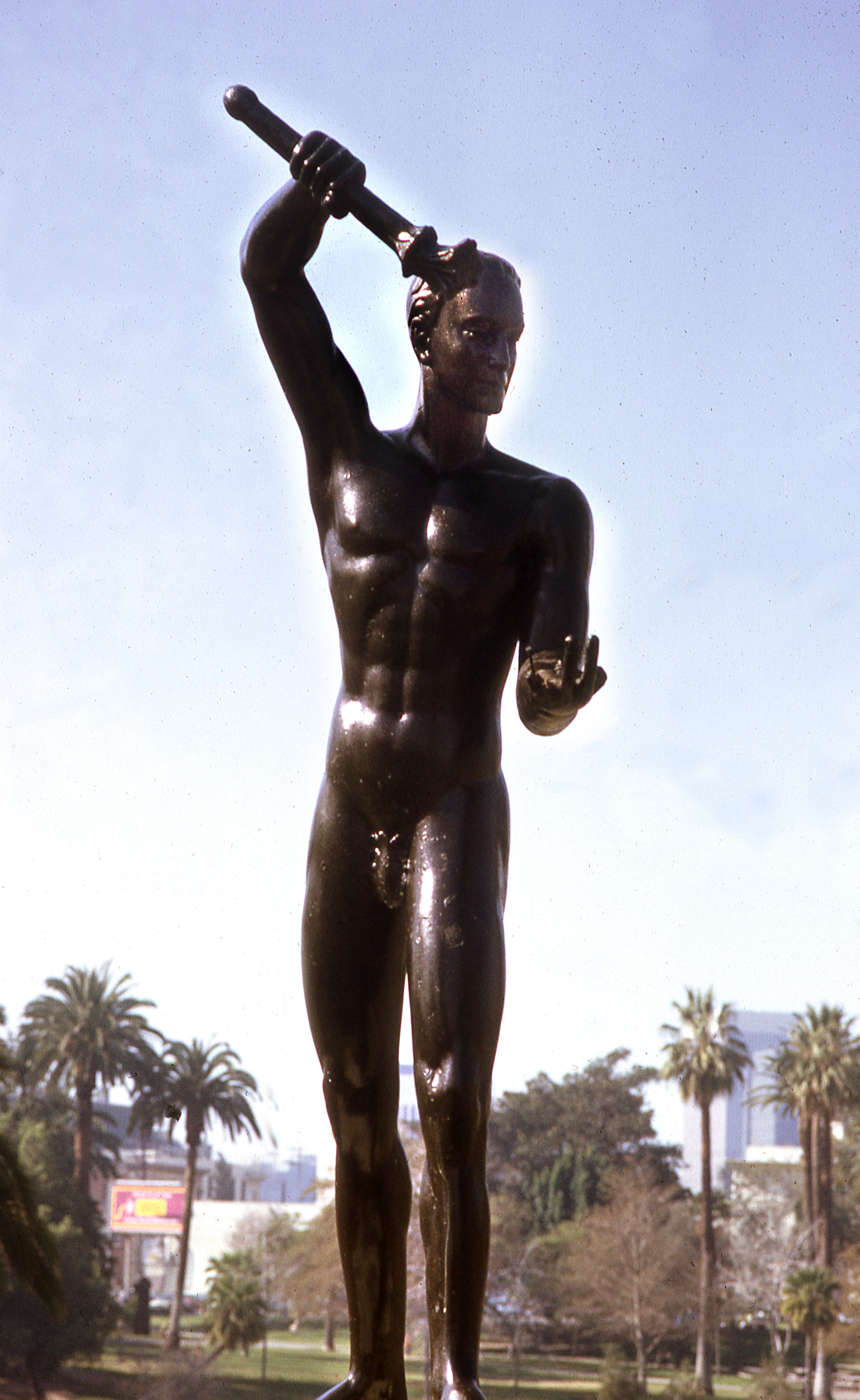
- Artist: Nína Sæmundsson
- Location: Los Angeles, California, U.S.
- 34°3′28.9″N 118°16′34.8″W

Prometheus Bringing Fire to Earth is an outdoor sculpture by Icelandic artist Nína Sæmundsson, installed in MacArthur Park, in Los Angeles, California, United States.
