= Guarimba =

Venezuelan opposition protest method

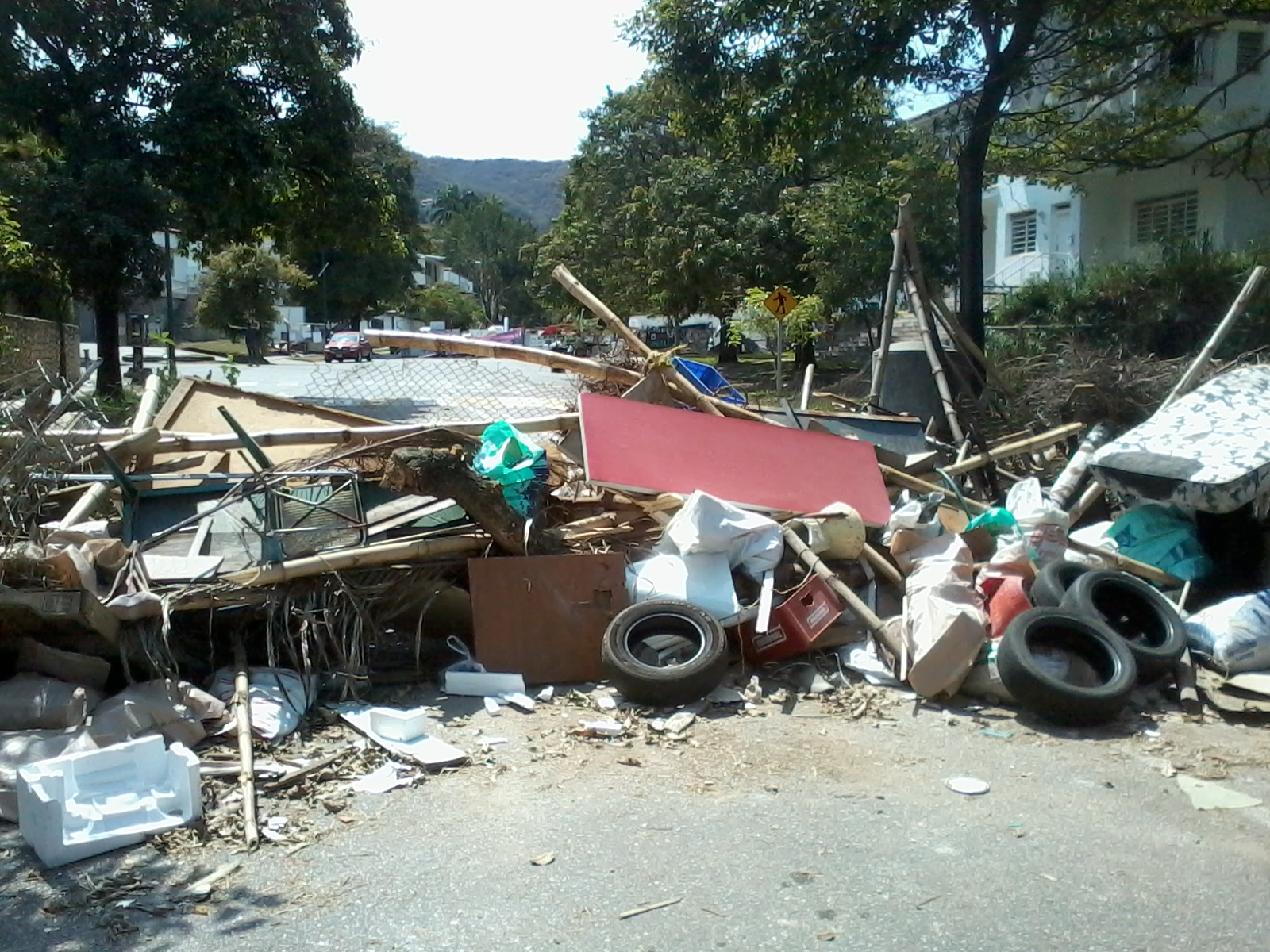
A barricade built by protesters blocking a street in Caracas, 2014

Guarimba is a term colloquially used in Venezuela for a protest method primarily used by the Venezuelan opposition that involves erecting street barricades or roadblocks. Although the erection of barricades in Venezuela dates back decades, the term has gained relevance during protests against the governments of Hugo Chávez and Nicolás Maduro, when it has become a pejorative and stigmatizing term. Venezuelan officials have used the term to disqualify and criminalize the opposition or opposition demonstrations.

== History ==
=== Origin ===
According to Cuban dissident Roberto Alonso, the use of the term began during the dictatorship of Marcos Pérez Jiménez in the 1950s, when the resistance used churches as a refuge after acting against the dictatorship. Venezuelan non-governmental organization PROVEA said that a history of using barricades previously existed when left-wing groups in Venezuelan public universities used a similar tactic during the 1980s and 1990s.

Roberto Alonso, a leader of the Venezuelan opposition group Bloque Democrático (BD), popularized the term "guarimba". Origins of the word guarimba are derived from the children's game of the same name that is similar to tag, where individuals jump from one circle to the other while avoiding being captured by someone. The word comes from the Frankish warjan (to protect), from which other words such as garrison, garage and garita are also derived.^{[1]}

According to Alonso, the word "guarimba" means "refuge" and not "barricade."

Alonso said the protest method was inspired from the book From Dictatorship to Democracy by Gene Sharp, which he read after 19 people were killed in the Llaguno Overpass shootout and President Hugo Chávez was briefly ousted in the 2002 coup attempt. By December 2002 Alonso started sending emails criticizing Chávez and detailing future actions, until his addresses list amassed over two million contacts. In an essay in May 2003 inviting people to participate in the barricades, he described the guarimba:

EVERYONE head out into the streets IN FRONT OF OUR HOMES and remain there.... La Guarimba is total anarchy. Everyone does what they want, depending on their level of frustration.

Alonso also proposed three "golden rules" for the guarimba:

1. Barricade streets near your home
2. Don't move away from your home
3. Don't participate in confrontation

=== 2004 protests ===
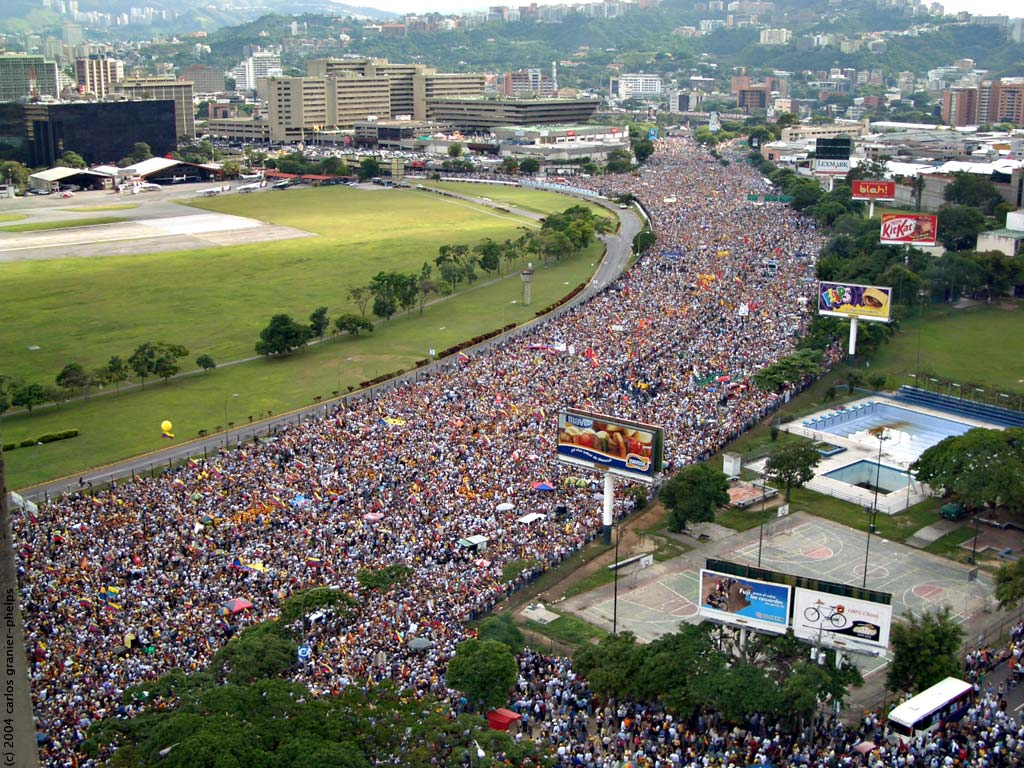
A rally in favor of the 2004 Venezuelan referendum to recall Hugo Chávez in the capital, Caracas.

The first protests, known as the "Guarimbazo", began on 27 February 2004 and lasted five consecutive days, taking place mainly in middle and upper class neighborhoods of Caracas and fifteen other cities of the country. The demonstrations sought to protest against the decisions of the National Electoral Council, after it announced that the signatures presented to request the 2004 presidential recall referendum had to be examined a second time. The protests were initially promoted by Bloque Democrático, an organization that separated from the Coordinadora Democrática organization coalition after the 2002 coup attempt for insisting on a violent solution to the political conflict, which rejected the recall referendum as "a trap of the regime". Alonso, the leader of Bloque Democrático, told his family to leave his Daktari ranch and travel to Miami, saying that he and an opposition leader later launched protests on 5 March 2004 with a plan to have a military coup on 7 March.

That year, the "guarimba" consisted in erecting barricades near homes, with garbage and fire, and remaining present as long as no security forces or pro-government supporters arrived. In many places, the barricades did not generate confrontation with security officials or related entities and generated violence. However, in some cases, demonstrators confronted government or pro-government forces, destroyed public property and used firearms. In its 2004 annual report, non-governmental organization PROVEA registered that 27 out of 370 street closures between October 2003 and September 2004, resulted in violence, although it acknowledged that there was a significant underreporting of these. Around one out of every three demonstrations in that period were characterized by barricades.

Responses to the protests varied. The opposition distanced itself from the guarimbas, Coordinadora Democrática, though opposition officials controlling certain areas refused to disperse demonstrations. Security forces dependent on opposition mayoralties (including the Metropolitan Police of Caracas, the municipal police of Baruta and the municipal police of Chacao) refrained from responding to the protesters and in some cases even helped to erect barricades. Bodies dependent on the national government–particularly the National Guard–responded to contain and disperse the demonstrators. Such actions also varied depending on the time and place. On some occasions, the action was in accordance with the law, while on others it was outside of it, when protesters were beaten, injured or arbitrarily detained.

The guarimbas caused division amongst the opposition; parties such as Justice First, Project Venezuela Radical Cause along with fired PDVSA workers wanted to continue protesting, rejecting negotiations, while the parties Copei, Democratic Action and Movimiento al Socialismo supported obliging to the CNE's request to obtain signatures once more. Ultimately, negotiations occurred between the opposition and the government, with both agreeing on collecting new signatures, leading to the end of the protests. The Venezuelan government described the guarimba as "systematic acts of violent and disruptive civil disobedience designed to protest President Chávez, generate headlines, and create fear among civil society" and called for the arrest of Alonso. During the protests, 9 people were killed, of which at least 4 were due to the response of security officials, hundreds were injured and 300 were arrested.

Following the protests, Alonso became a fugitive, meeting with a group of fifty individuals known as the "Brigade Daktari" in April 2004, then fled to neighboring Colombia and arriving in Miami in late April. Weeks later on 9 May 2004, Alonso's ranch was raided by the Venezuelan government, with authorities arresting dozens of Colombians on the property and its environs on suspicion of being paramilitaries destined to overthrow the Chávez government. Two days later on 11 May, Alonso continued to call for rebellion against Chávez, making radio announcements in Venezuela promoting protests, saying "the illusion that we are going to overthrow a Castro-communist dictatorial regime with signatures, that does not exist."

=== 2009 protests ===
President Chávez used the term at an event in Carabobo in January 2009, referring to protests against the 2009 constitutional referendum, suggesting the government use police to forcibly dissolve them.

=== 2014 protests ===
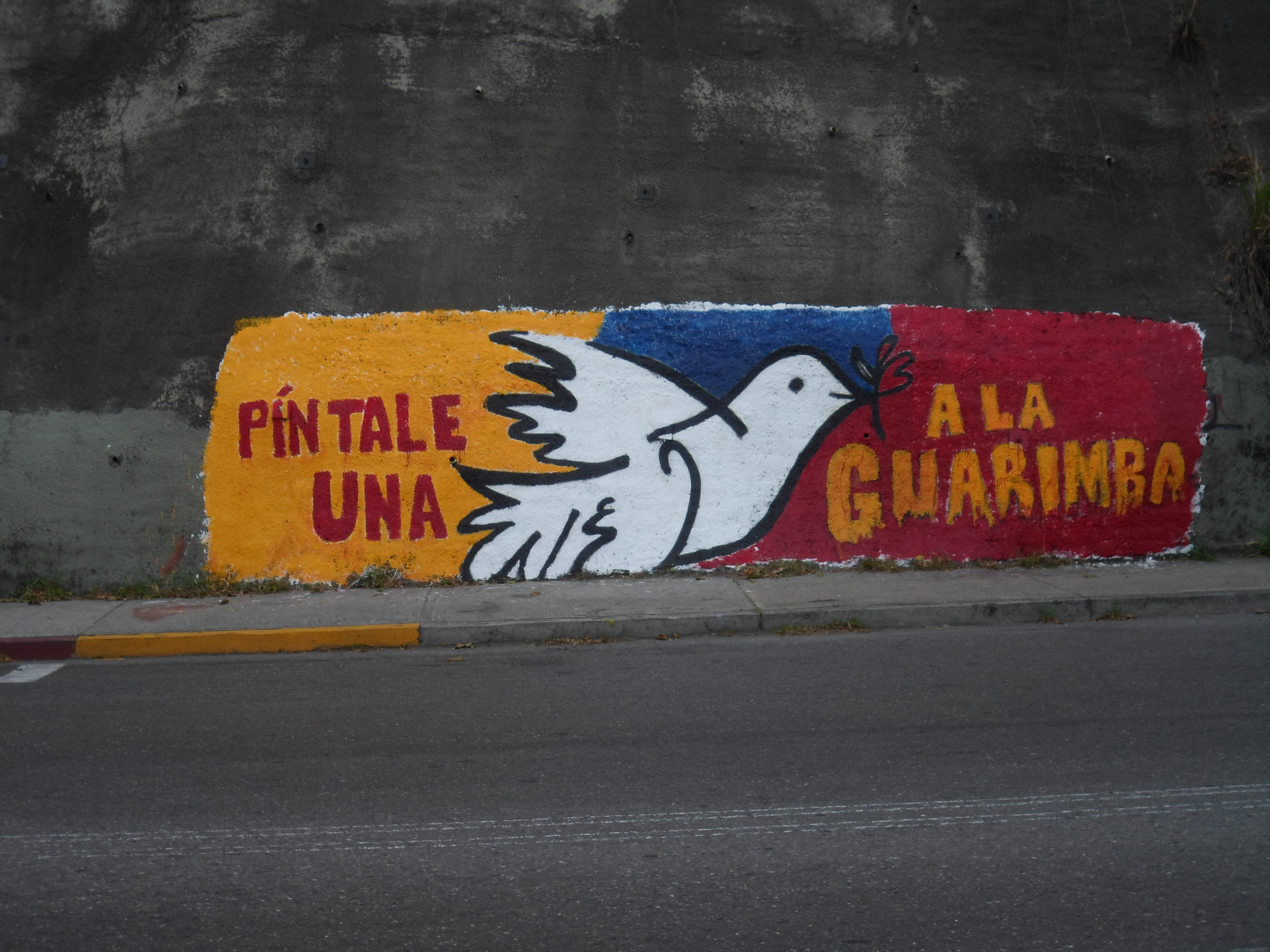
A wall painting in Caracas criticizing "guarimbas", 2014

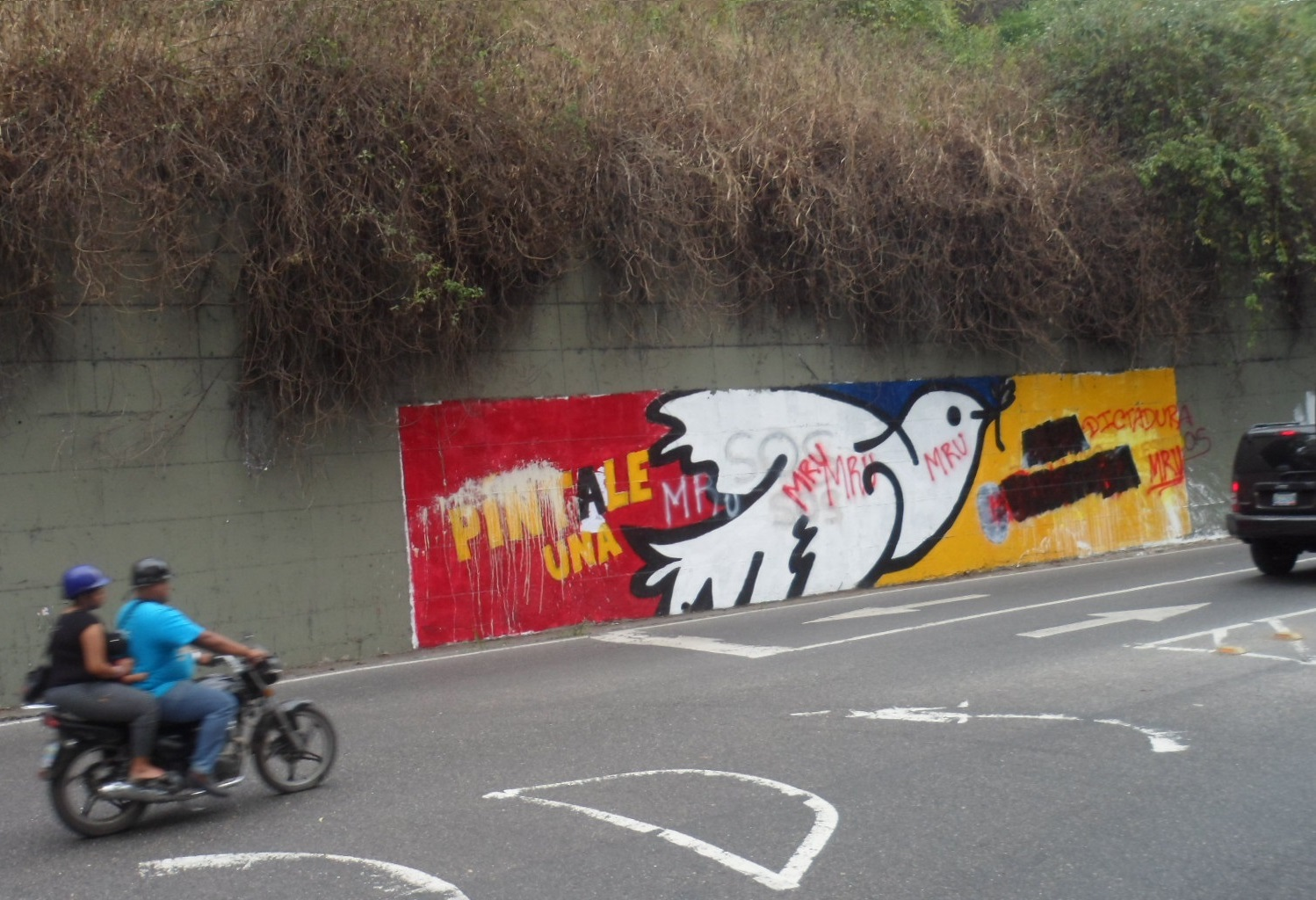
A mural previously criticizing the barricades changed to criticize the government, 2014

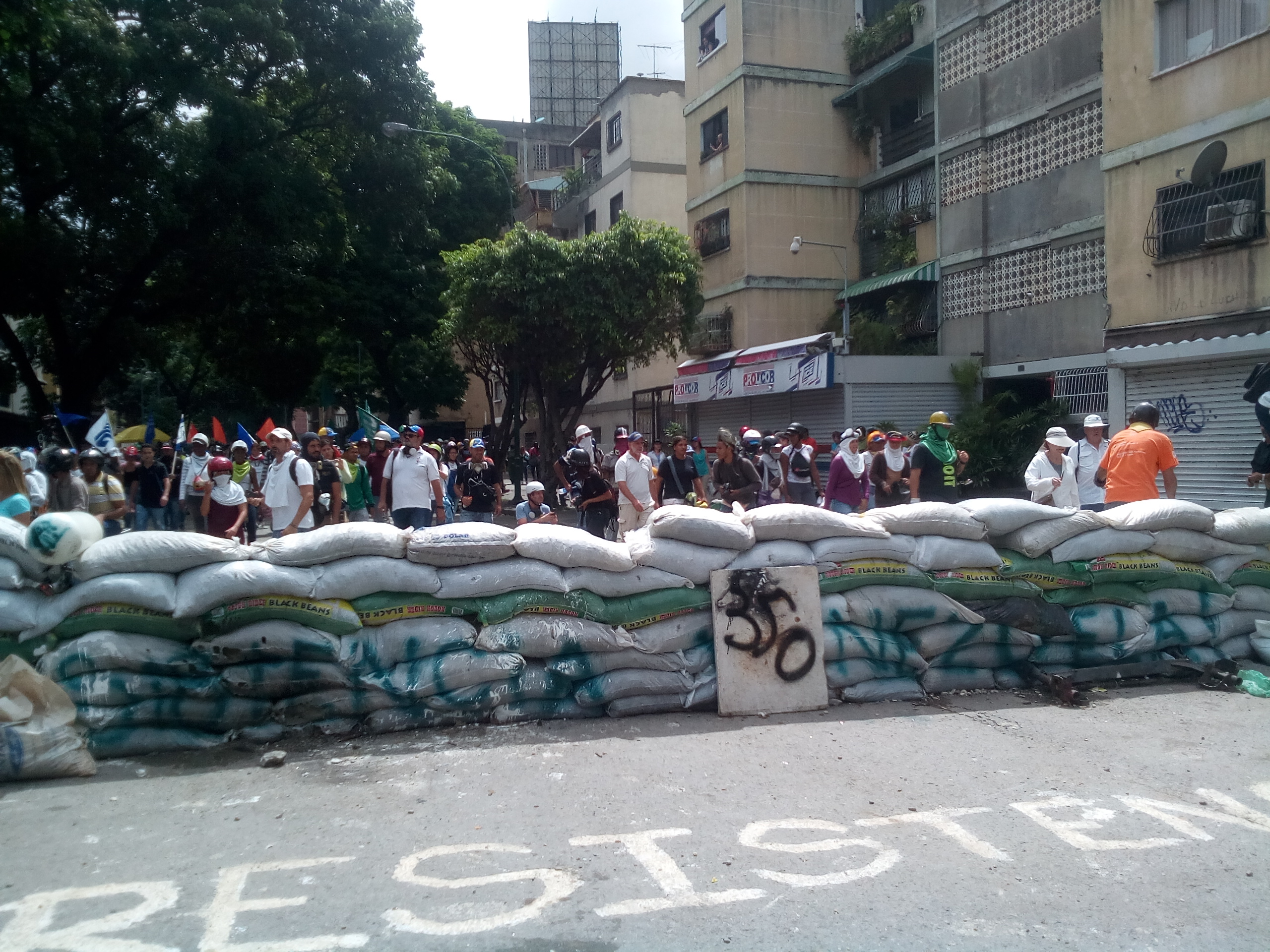
Barricade erected in Caracas in 2017.

After opposition leaders Leopoldo López, María Corina Machado and Antonio Ledezma called for more intense protests against President Nicolás Maduro with their La Salida campaign, protesters began to create barricades throughout streets, while also throwing objects and Molotov cocktails. Guarimbas were particularly common in the Táchira state and were even used to protect demonstrations, preventing security forces from advancing into areas where rallies or marches were taking place.

Traffic blockades were carried out in streets and avenues, mainly in middle and upper class residential neighborhoods nationwide, and became places where opposition demonstrations regrouped. Canadian Political Scientist Don Kingsbury wrote that guarimbas were "explicitly framed as a means of protecting established zones of privilege from government supporters" and described barricades as a "practice of erecting policed borders at the internal-racial and class-borders of the city." By April 2014, Oxford Analytica wrote that the protests had become "inchoate and violent" and that half of the protest deaths were estimated to have occurred at barricades. Protesters frequently targeted the Caracas Metro and Caracas Metrobus, with forty buses being attacked in the first weeks of protests. As protests progressed, individuals from guarimbas targeted Metrobuses with molotov cocktails, occasionally with riders inside. By May 2014, the government reported that at least 100 buses were damaged from fire bombs and that fifty-seven public employees were injured from the attacks.

During the protests, some detaines suffered abuse during their arrest and detention afterwards and did not have access to medical treatment while in custody. Many were insulted with political epithets, accused of being "guarimberos". A panel of independent experts appointed by the Secretary General of the Organization of American States documented several of these cases.

Authorities under the Maduro administration were more repressive towards protesters compared to the Chávez administration. A former official of the Bolivarian Intelligence Service (SEBIN) told the Independent International Fact-Finding Mission on Venezuela that its director, Carlos Calderón, was directly involved in torture within the agency during the protests. Among other alleged ill-treatment, he reportedly placed plastic bags on protesters, or poured water on them, and beat them to extract information.

In April 2014, La Vanguardia reported that Tamoa Calzadilla, the head of investigative journalists at Últimas Noticias, had resigned after being told not to do a story on guarimbas and after the manager tried to force her to say that the guarimbas were funded, that they were not protesters and to conclude the story by condemning them.

=== 2017 protests ===
During the 2017 protests, a military cadence of Bolivarian Intelligence Service (SEBIN) officers, where they express wanting to kill protesters, went viral: "Quisiera tener un puñal de acero para degollar a un maldito guarimbero" (Spanish: I wish I had a steel dagger to slit the throat of a damn guarimbero).

After the activation of Plan Zamora during the protests, the number of arbitrary arrests and people tried before military courts increased significantly. Those detained were generally accused of being "guarimberos," a term that is not defined under the military terminology, and of the crime of "affront to the sentinel" (military personnel). The OAS Panel of Independent Experts also documented several of these instances, like those during the 2014 protests.

In some cases, citizens blocked streets with bags and boxes of garbage to protested against the lack of trash collection in their neighborhoods; in Villa del Rosario, Zulia state, there were sectors that had been without street cleaning for up to six months.

== Organization and tactics ==
According to PROVEA, guarimberos organized through social media and are not related to specific political groups. The human rights group also says that while guarimberos help regulate the conflict between authorities and protesters, they do occasionally instigate confrontation. As the protests evolved, the guarimberos developed a system comprising three groups; escuderos (squires), atacantes (attackers) and defensores (defenders). Squires were tasked with repelling tear gas bombs and other projectiles, attackers would throw back gas canisters and defenders would tend to injured civilians and transport them away from areas of confrontation.

Barricades typically consist of damaged property that is constructed of bricks, tires, trash and burning cars. During the 2014 protests, retired general Ángel Vivas tweeted a suggestion that wires should be hung across streets as a defense against pro-government colectivos; the Venezuelan government issued an arrest order against him afterwards. Protesters have used homemade caltrops made of hose pieces and nails, colloquially known in Spanish as "miguelitos" or "chinas", to deflate motorbike tires. Demonstrators have cited videos of protests in Ukraine and Egypt as inspiration for their tactics in defending barricades and repelling government forces, such as using common items such as beer bottles, metal tubing, and gasoline to construct fire bombs and mortars, while using bottles filled with paint to block the views of tank and armored riot vehicle drivers. Common protective gear for protesters include motorcycle helmets, construction dust masks, shields and gloves.

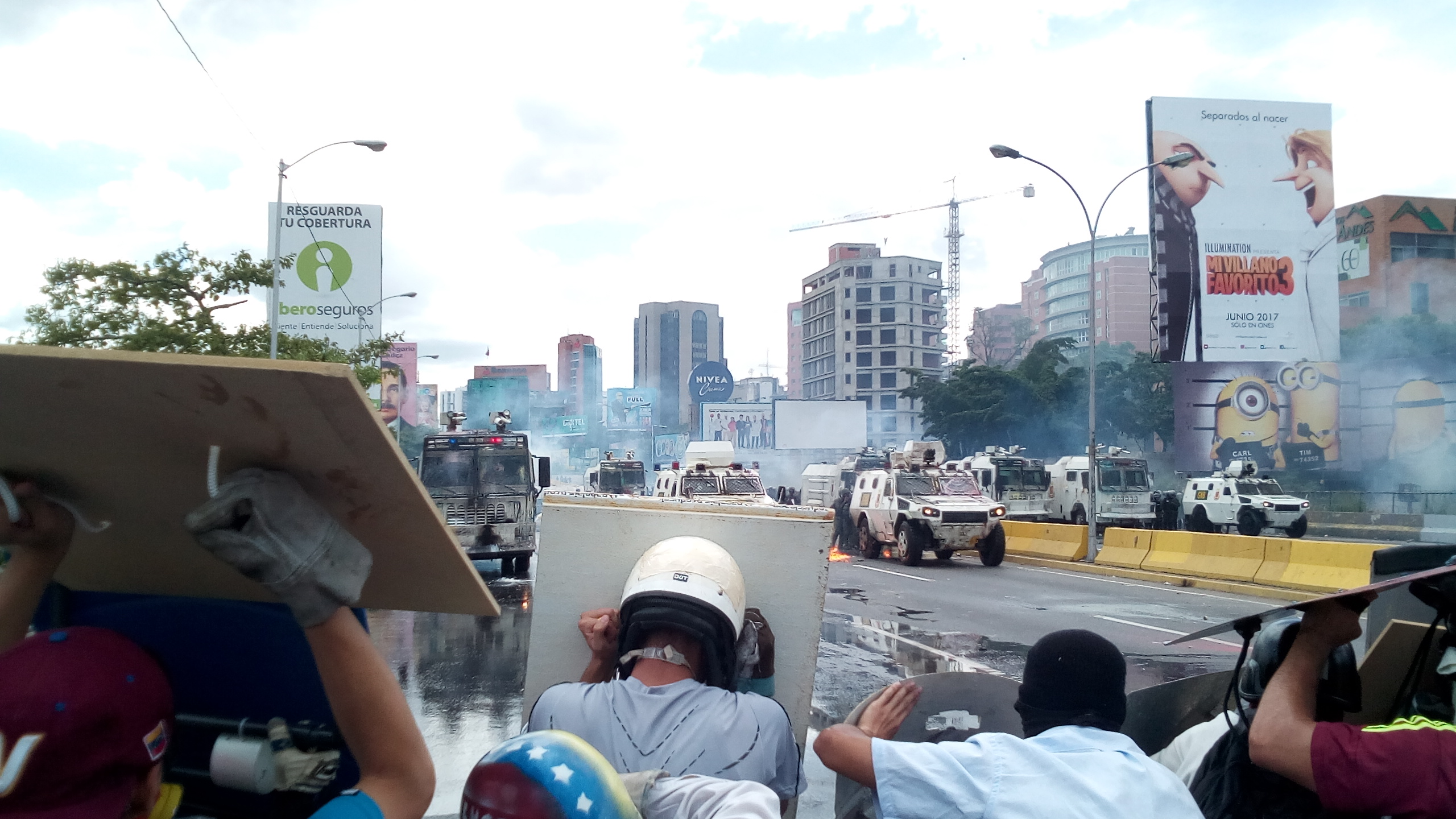
Escuderos confronting the Venezuelan National Guard

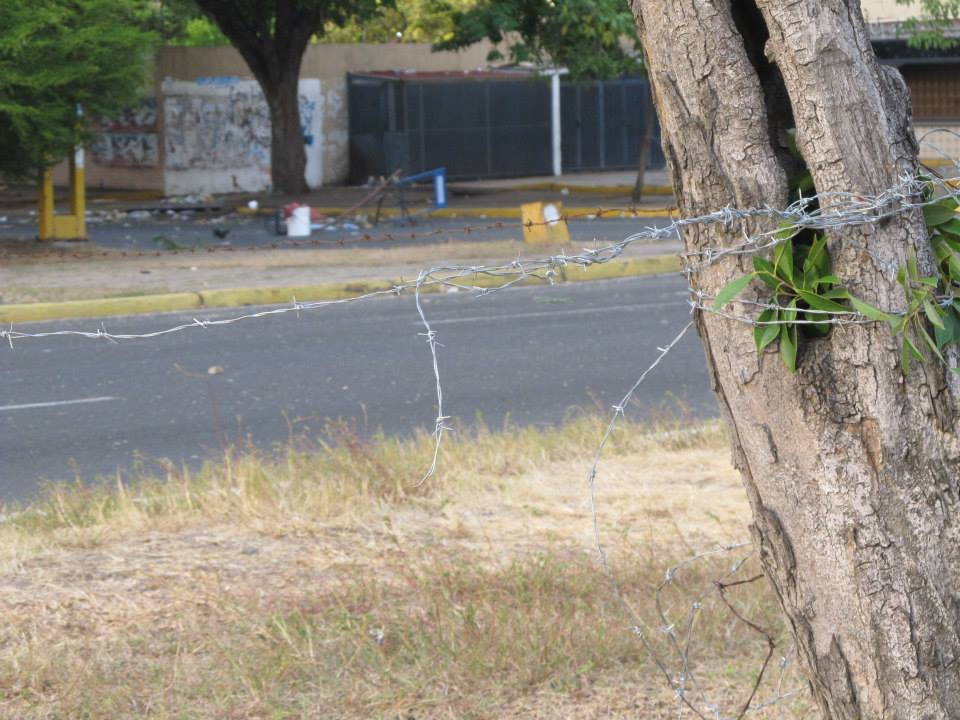
Barbed wire strung across a street by protesters

Venezuelan National Guard clearing a guarimba barricade

== Responses ==
The views on guarimberos are polarized in Venezuela. According to The Atlantic, guarimbas are used by "more radical elements" of the opposition that the protest method helped the government instead, providing a justification to crackdown on demonstrations. Critics have said that guarimbas affect local residents and businesses, having little political impact. During protests against the government of Nicolás Maduro, the term "guarimbero" was used by the government, leftists and opposition to criticize individuals who participated in the method. In 2014, the majority of Venezuelans rejected guarimbas according to a Datanalisis poll; disagreement with the tactic was shared by 70% of opposition respondents and 87% of independent and pro-government respondents.

=== Government ===
The government has opposed the usage of guarimbas. The government of Nicolás Maduro criticized the tactic's use as a way to disqualify the opposition as "fascist" and "violent".

National Guard manual where "guarimberos" are defined as internal enemies of the State

On 1 April 2015, the General Commander of the Bolivarian National Guard (GNB), Néstor Reverol, published a procedural manual related to public order which defined internal enemies of the State, including "individuals who may be nationals or foreigners who are in the national territory and who maintain positions opposed to the policies of the national government" and includes "guarimberos" within such category, defining guarimberos as individuals who risk the lives of others through death or injury and risking damage to "goods and services." The manual recognizes that such a group may not intend to cause harm and may be demonstrating for lack of services or civil and political rights, also stating that military intervention is required, accusing them of generating violence. The document also describes that "men, women, children and the elderly" may be "guarimberos", and therefore can be subject to various use of force continuum described in the manual.

El Helicoide originally had a cell known as "Preventive I" in its Access Area, also known as "Infiernito" (Little Hell), with dimensions of 3 x 5 meters and where new arrivals were held. By 2014, it was the only cell of this type, but when detentions began to increase, three additional areas were created later, known as "Preventive II", "Preventive III" and "Preventive IV". By 2015, Preventiva I was intended for common prisoners, while the other three cells were intended for students, Twitter users and "guarimberos". Former detainees at the El Helicoide interviewed by the Fact-Finding Mission reported that there was a detention area referred to as the "Guarimbero" cell, itself an annex of the "Guantánamo" cell. While "Guantánamo" held the majority of non-political detainees, detainees arrested during protests or opposition were incarcerated in the "Guarimbero" cell. The former detainees said that both holding cells were overcrowded and in very poor conditions, with no access to water or toilets, and where inmates have had to sleep on the floor.

=== Opposition ===
Opposition protesters have argued that guarimbas are used for protection against armed groups, and not only as a form of protest. Opposition leader and former presidential candidate Henrique Capriles described the guarimba as "a massive national failure."

== See also ==
- Protests against Nicolás Maduro
- Kale borroka
- Resistencia (Venezuela)

== Bibliography ==
- Independent International Fact-Finding Mission on Venezuela (15 September 2020). Conclusiones detalladas de la Misión internacional independiente de determinación de los hechos sobre la República Bolivariana de Venezuela [Detailed findings of the independent international fact-finding mission on the Bolivarian Republic of Venezuela] (PDF) (in Spanish).
- Independent International Fact-Finding Mission on Venezuela (12 September 2022). Crímenes de lesa humanidad cometidos a través de los servicios de inteligencia del Estado: estructuras y personas involucradas en la implementación de un plan para reprimir la oposición al gobierno [Crimes against humanity committed through the State intelligence services: structures and individuals involved in the implementation of a plan to repress opposition to the government.].
- Informe de la Secretaría General de la Organización de los Estados Americanos y del Panel de Expertos Internacionales Independientes sobre la Posible Comisión de Crímenes de Lesa Humanidad en Venezuela [Report of the General Secretariat of the Organization of American States and of the Panel of Independent International Experts on the Possible Commission of Crimes Against Humanity in Venezuela] (PDF) (in Spanish). Washington D.C.: Organization of American States. 29 May 2018.
