= Mrs. Parkington =

1944 film by Tay Garnett

- VHS cover
- Directed by: Tay Garnett
- Screenplay by: Robert Thoeren; Polly James
- Based on: Mrs. Parkington; 1943 novel by Louis Bromfield
- Produced by: Leon Gordon
- Starring: Greer Garson; Walter Pidgeon
- Cinematography: Joseph Ruttenberg
- Edited by: George Boemler
- Music by: Bronislau Kaper
- Production company: Metro-Goldwyn-Mayer
- Distributed by: Loew's Inc.
- Release date: October 12, 1944 (United States)
- Running time: 124 minutes
- Country: United States
- Language: English
- Budget: $1,574,000
- Box office: $5,631,000

Mrs. Parkington is a 1944 drama film. It tells the story of a woman's life, told via flashbacks, from boarding house maid to society matron. The movie was adapted by Polly James and Robert Thoeren from the novel by Louis Bromfield. It was directed by Tay Garnett and starred Greer Garson and Walter Pidgeon appearing together as husband and wife for the fourth time.

== Plot ==
Susie Parkington, an elderly matron and widow of wealthy businessman and financier Major Augustus Parkington, is visited in 1938 by her many relatives, except her beloved great-granddaughter Jane. Except for Jane, Susie's heirs are boorish, dissolute, and unhappy despite their wealth. When Jane does appear, she informs her great-grandmother that she plans to secretly elope with Ned Talbot, her father's employee, who wishes to take her away from her family and their way of life.

Susie has a flashback to when she was a teenager helping her mother run a boarding house for silver miners in Leaping Rock, Nevada. She meets Major Parkington, the owner of the mine, when he stays at the boardinghouse on a visit. Shortly afterwards, a serious mine accident occurs which kills Susie's mother along with a number of miners. Rather than abandon Susie, Augustus marries her and takes her away to New York City. Susie is introduced to Baroness Aspasia Conti, a French aristocrat and close friend and former mistress of Augustus, who helps Susie pick out clothes and learn social graces.

Back in the present, Susie meets with Ned, who reveals that Jane's father Amory is being investigated for fraud, and Ned planned to take Jane away in order to avoid telling her or having to testify against Amory. Susie disapproves, prompting Jane to send Ned away. Amory confesses to Susie and Jane that he did commit fraud and begs Susie for a $31 million loan to cover his actions and avoid prison. Susie is inclined to give him the loan but says he must ask the rest of the family, as Amory would be spending their inheritance.

Susie reminisces about her third anniversary when Augustus presented her with a grand house, furnished with Aspasia's help. Susie announces that she is pregnant, and an elated Augustus holds a ball to celebrate. He invites rich and prominent citizens of New York but is enraged when most refuse to attend due to his behavior. This upsets Susie, who suffers a miscarriage after fainting and falling down the stairs.

Secretly, Augustus vows revenge against the non-attendees and manages to force many of them out of business over the next few years. Susie finds out after Mrs. Livingstone, whose husband is about to be put out of business by Augustus, pleads with Susie for help and informs her that another man committed suicide after Augustus ruined him. Susie argues with Augustus, who remains unrepentant, so she separates and moves to Long Island. Weeks later, Augustus begs his wife to return, revealing that he has been unsuccessful in putting the Livingstones out of business. Susie reveals that she has been financially supporting the Livingstone business and asks Augustus to stop. He agrees and the couple reunite.

In the present, Susie's heirs refuse to lend Amory the money, as she expected. Amory, overcoming his fear, resolves to make a full confession to the authorities; Susie approves, saying it is what the Major would have done.

Susie has a flashback, this time to when her son Herbert was killed. Susie becomes a recluse for a year while Augustus moves to England, rents a lavish country home, and has an affair with Lady Norah Ebbsworth. Aspasia convinces Susie to fight for her marriage, so Susie goes to England and, with the assistance of the Prince of Wales, convinces Augustus to end his affair. Following this, Aspasia reveals that she will be moving back to Paris. Susie reveals that she has always known that Aspasia loved Augustus. Augustus and Susie have a heart-to-heart in which he hopes that if their grandchildren become reliant on inherited money, he or Susie will be alive to set them straight.

In the present, Susie realizes she made a mistake in making Jane send Ned away and tells her to follow her heart. Jane leaves to pursue Ned. Finally, Susie makes the decision to bail out Amory, as many "little people" would otherwise lose their money. Her family leaves in disgust after learning they will be cut off. Once they leave, Susie calls upstairs for her maid to make ready for the day. She says that after the finances are distributed, they will return to Leaping Rock.

== Cast ==
- Greer Garson as Susie Parkington
- Walter Pidgeon as Major Augustus Parkington
- Edward Arnold as Amory Stilham
- Agnes Moorehead as Baroness Aspasia Conti
- Cecil Kellaway as Edward VII, Prince of Wales
- Tala Birell as Lady Nora Ebbsworth
- Gladys Cooper as Alice (née Parkington), Duchess de Brancourt
- Frances Rafferty as Jane Stilham
- Tom Drake as Ned Talbot
- Dan Duryea as Jack Stilham
- Helen Freeman as Helen (née Parkington) Stilham
- Lee Patrick as Madeleine (née Parkington) Swann
- Rod Cameron as Al Swann
- Peter Lawford as Lord Thornley
- Hugh Marlowe as John Marbey
- Fortunio Bonanova Signor Cellini
- Selena Royle as Mattie Trouson
- Harry Cording as Humphrey
- Hans Conried as Mr. Ernst
- Gerald Oliver Smith as Taylor
- Gordon Richards as James
- Wallis Clark as Capt. McTavish (uncredited)
- Al Ferguson as Miner (uncredited)
- Byron Foulger as Norman Vance (uncredited)
- Howard Hickman as Dr. Herrick (uncredited)
- Brandon Hurst as Footman (uncredited)

== Awards ==
Garson was nominated for an Oscar for Best Actress and Agnes Moorehead for Best Supporting Actress. Moorehead also won the Golden Globe Award for Best Supporting Actress.

== Box office ==
According to MGM records, the film earned $3,062,000 in the US and Canada and $2,569,000 elsewhere resulting in a profit of $2,198,000.

== Radio adaptation ==
Mrs. Parkington was presented on Lux Radio Theatre November 25, 1946. Pidgeon and Garson reprised their roles from the film.
