= MacArthur Monument (West Point) =

- United States
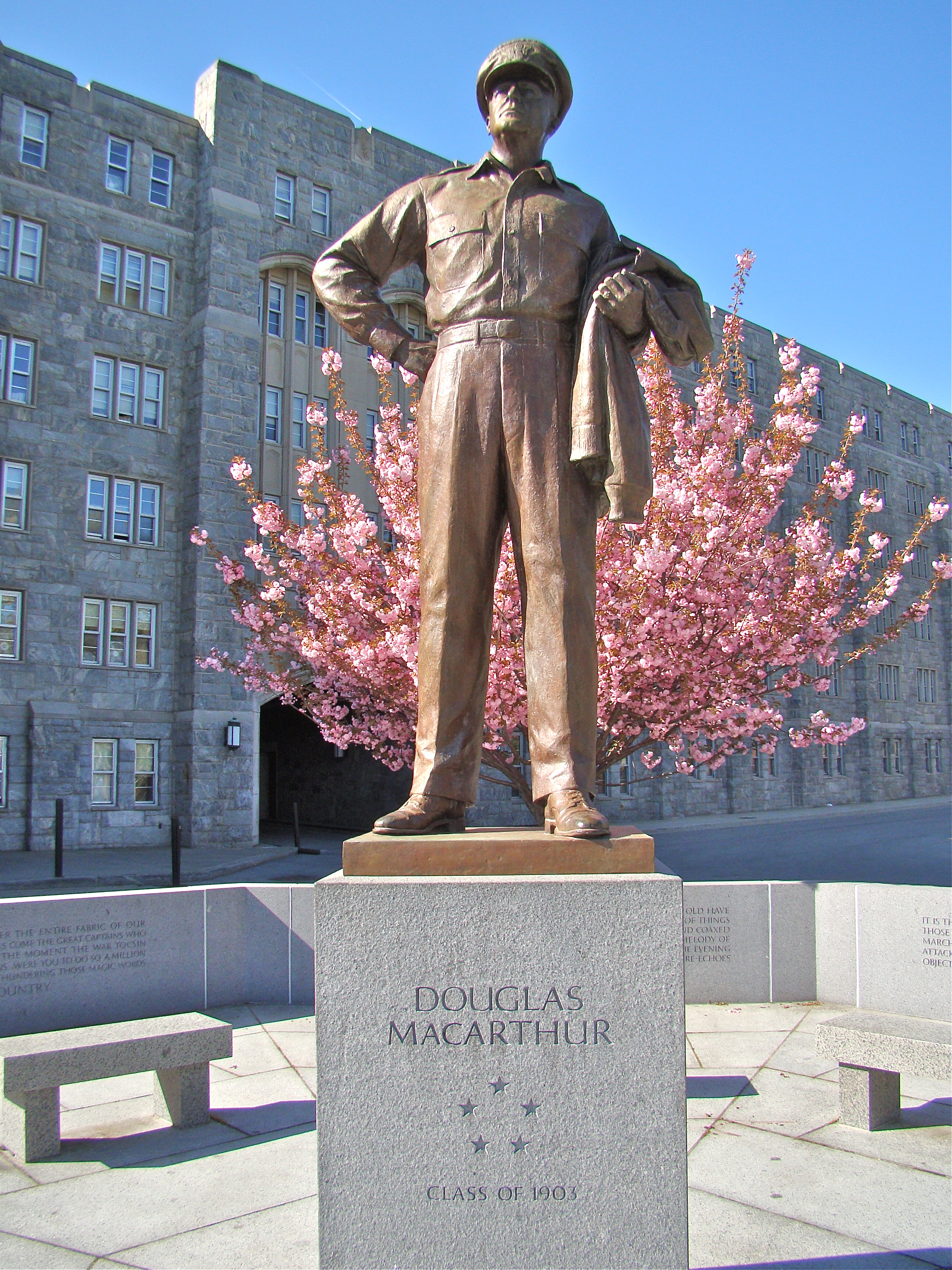
- MacArthur monument at West Point
- For Douglas MacArthur
- Unveiled: 1969
- Location: 41°23′33.89″N 73°57′31.61″W near Highland Falls, New York
- Designed by: Walker Hancock

The Douglas MacArthur Monument at the United States Military Academy at West Point commemorates the Medal of Honor-winning former Superintendent and General of the Army Douglas MacArthur. Designed by Walker Hancock, it was dedicated by MacArthur's widow Jean MacArthur in 1969. Situated on the upper western corner of the Plain next to the north entrance to MacArthur Barracks, the monument consists of a statue of the general surrounded by angled granite walls that bear inscribed excerpts from his final public speech, the 1962 Duty, Honor, Country address he made to the Corps of Cadets upon receiving the Thayer Award.

== See also ==
- MacArthur Memorial – Museum and burial site in Norfolk, Virginia
- MacArthur Monument – Statue in Los Angeles
