= Military cadence =

Work songs used in militaries

United States Army soldiers calling cadence, during Basic Combat Training at Fort Jackson, South Carolina, in 2008

A military cadence or cadence call is a call-and-response work song sung by military personnel while running or marching. They are counterparts of the military march. Military cadences often take their rhythms from the work being done, much like the sea shanty. Cadences usually have a call and response structure in which one servicemember initiates a line, and the remaining servicemembers complete it, instilling teamwork and camaraderie.

== History ==
=== United States ===
==== The Duckworth Chant ====
A V-Disc issued in 1944 credits the origin of "The Duckworth Chant" (also known as "Sound Off") to Private Willie Lee Duckworth of Sandersville, Georgia, an African-American soldier serving in the United States Army.

... as a company ... was returning from a long tedious march through swamps and rough country, a chant broke the stillness of the night. Upon investigation, it was found that a Negro soldier by the name of Willie Duckworth, on detached service with the Provisional Training Center, was chanting to build up the spirits of his comrades.

It was not long before the infectious rhythm was spreading throughout the ranks. Tired soldiers started to pick up their step in cadence with the growing chorus of hearty male voices. Instead of a downtrodden, fatigued company, here marched 200 soldiers with heads up, spring to their step, and happy smiles on their faces. This transformation occurred with the beginning of the Duckworth Chant.

Upon returning to Fort Slocum, Pvt. Duckworth, with the aid of Provisional Training Center instructors, composed a series of verses and choruses to be used with the marching cadence. Since that eventful evening, the Duckworth Chant has been made a part of the drill at Fort Slocum as it proved to be not only a tremendous morale factor while marching, but also coordinated the movements of close-order drill with troop precision.

This original cadence was recorded as "Sound Off":

Sound-off; 1 - 2; Sound-off; 3 - 4; Cadence count; 1 - 2 - 3 - 4; 1 - 2 — 3 - 4.

This cadence, known as the "Duckworth Chant", still exists with variations in the different branches of the U.S. military. Duckworth's simple chant was elaborated on by Army drill sergeants and their trainees, and the practice of creating elaborate marching chants spread to the Air Force, Marine Corps, and Navy.

A musical version of the chant was recorded by Vaughn Monroe and His Orchestra (Voc.: Vaughn Monroe & Chorus in New York City) on March 7, 1951. It was released by RCA Victor Records as catalog number 20-4113A (in USA) and by EMI on their His Master's Voice label as catalog number B 10086.

A variant of that cadence was used in the 1949 film Battleground and in the 1981 film Taps, filmed at Valley Forge Military Academy and College in Wayne, Pennsylvania. It appears in two versions in the film, both ending in the same cadence.

Other cadences include "Blood on the Risers", "I Wish All the Girls Were", "Captain Jack" (Army), and "Yellow Ribbon" (Army).

==== Jody calls ====
In the United States, jody calls (also spelled jodie) are named for "Jody", a mythical civilian whose comfortable lifestyle is contrasted with the austerity of military life. Common themes of jody calls include homesickness, the difficulties of military life, personal boasts, and loyalty.

=== Other countries ===
During the 2017 Venezuelan protests, a cadence sung by Bolivarian Intelligence Service (SEBIN) officers which expresses wanting to kill protesters went viral: Quisiera tener un puñal de acero para degollar a un maldito guarimbero (Spanish for "I wish I had a steel dagger to slit the throat of a damn guarimbero").

== See also ==
- Drum cadence
- March (music)
- Military parade
- Fiddler's Green

== Bibliography ==
- "ADA cadence calls." 1988. Source: Air Defense Artillery. May–June, 1988, pp. 33–40.
- Casey, Ryan. 2002. Cadences of the U.S. Marine Corps. San Diego, CA: Documentary Recordings. "Cadence calling directions; U.S. Marine Corps running cadences; Recon Marines; U.S. Marine Corps pride; Service rivalries; U.S. Marine drill instructors; Humorous cadences; From WWII to the War on Terror; 'Shorties'; U.S. Marine Corps marching cadences." ISBN 0972428100; 9780972428101.
- Deutsche Bundeswehr. 2008. German Army morning running cadence. "This is our own style and not a copy. Running cadences have to be faster than marching cadences. When marching, we're chanting "Infanterie, du bist die Krone aller Waffen", "Hätt ich nur eine Krone", "Grün ist unser Fallschirm", "Oh du schöner Westerwald", "Grüne Teufel" etc. Every branch has their own traditional cadences."
- Dunnigan, Timothy P. 1997. Modern military cadence. Alexandria, Va: Byrd Enterprises.
- Engstrom, John, and P. C. Butler. 1987. Count cadence count. Fallbrook, Calif: Best Military Publications.
- Frary, Joel. 2006. Army cadences. "Frary discusses the origin and importance of cadences in both a historical and moral context. Also, a brief background of the purposes of cadences, including their emotional, artistic and traditional attributes are discussed."
- Jody calls, armor cavalry. 1976. [Fort Knox, Ky.?]: Army. "Armor cavalry jody calls".
- Johnson, Sandee Shaffer. 1900. Cadences: the Jody call book. Canton, Ohio: Daring Press. ISBN 0938936115; 9780938936114.
- United States Army Infantry Center. 1984. Jody calls. Ft. Benning, Ga: The center.
