= Statue of Óscar Romero =

Statue in Los Angeles, California, U.S.

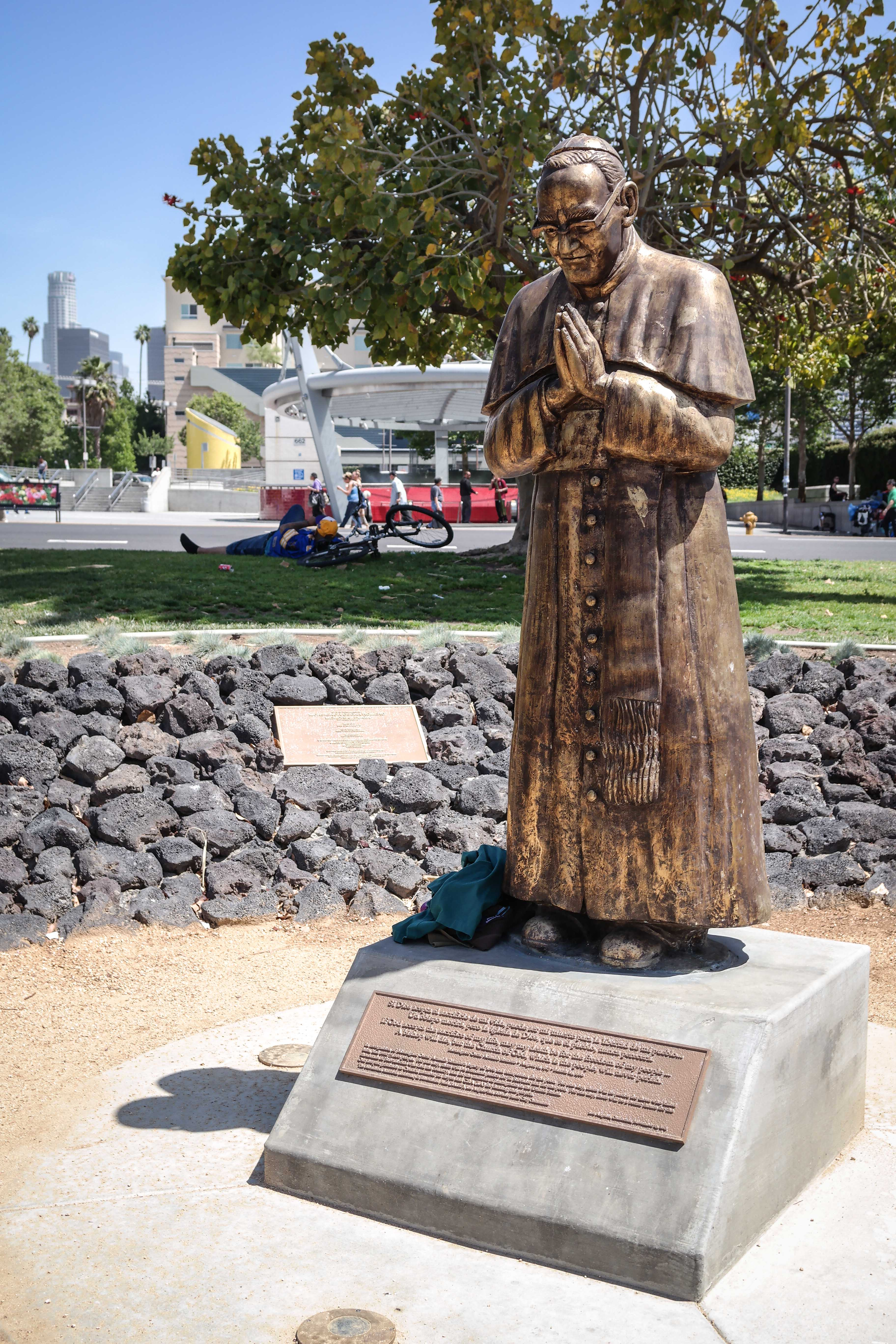
- The statue in 2014
- Subject: Óscar Romero
- Location: Los Angeles, California, U.S.; 34°3′25.9″N 118°16′36.1″W

A bronze statue of Salvadoran archbishop Óscar Romero is installed in Los Angeles' MacArthur Park, in the U.S. state of California. The 6.5-foot, 450-pound sculpture was made in El Salvador by artist Joaquin Serrano. The artwork was installed in November 2013, and cost $350,000.
