= MacArthur Park =

Los Angeles Historic-Cultural Monument

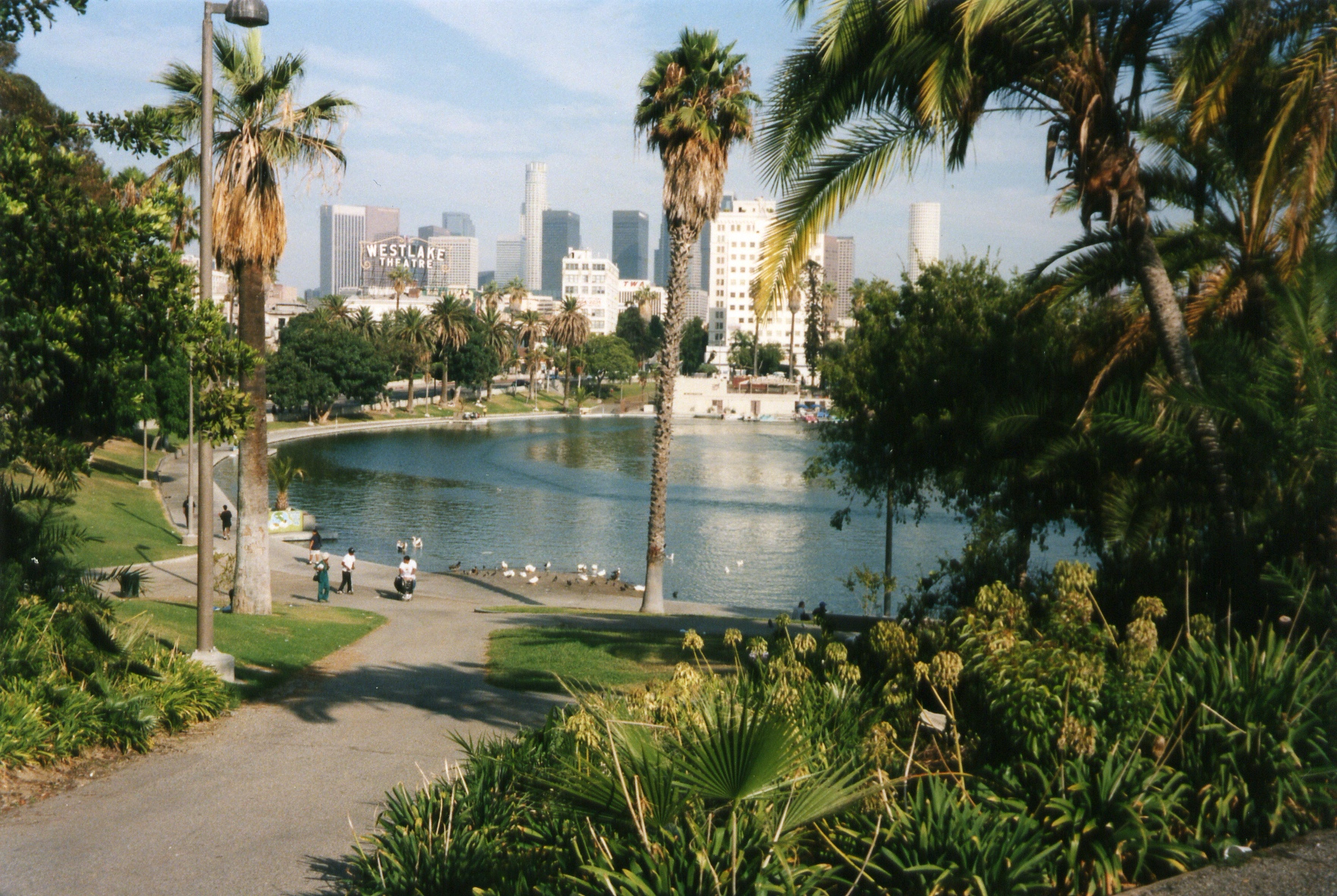
- Looking towards Downtown Los Angeles, August 2001

- Location within the Los Angeles metropolitan area Location within California Location within the United States
- Type: Urban park
- Location: Westlake, Los Angeles
- Coordinates: 34°03′31″N 118°16′39″W
- Area: 35 acres (14 ha)
- Created: 1880s
- Operator: City of Los Angeles Department of Recreation and Parks
- Status: Open all year
- Public transit: Westlake/MacArthur Park station

Los Angeles Historic-Cultural Monument
- Designated: May 1, 1972
- Reference no.: 100

MacArthur Park (originally Westlake Park) is a park dating back to the late 19th century in the Westlake neighborhood of Los Angeles, California, United States. In the early 1940s, it was renamed after General Douglas MacArthur, and later designated City of Los Angeles Historic Cultural Monument #100.

The lake in MacArthur Park is fed by natural springs (although an artificial bottom to the lake was laid during the construction of the Red Line, opened in 1993). In the past, a fountain with a reflecting pool on the northern end was also fed by the springs. The Westlake/MacArthur Park B and D Line station is across the street.

== Description ==
The park is divided in two by Wilshire Boulevard. The southern portion primarily consists of a lake, while the northern half includes an amphitheatre, bandshell, soccer fields, and children's playground, along with a recreation center operated by the City of Los Angeles Department of Recreation and Parks. The bandshell was once home to many organizations and events, such as Jugaremos en Familia (a live event hosted by Memo Flores for the Hispanic community).

Public artworks installed in the park have included the MacArthur Monument, Entry Arch, General Harrison Gray Otis, the Hungarian Freedom Fighters Memorial, MacArthur Park Singularity, Mine Was the Better Punch, But It Didn't Win the Wristwatch, and Prometheus Bringing Fire to Earth. Previously, the statue of Charles III of Spain was installed in the park.

== History ==
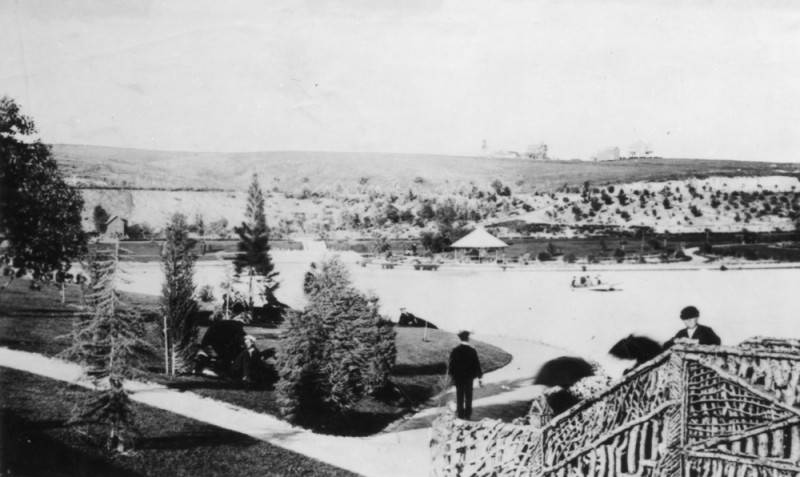
The image "Early view of Westlake Park" is from the Los Angeles Public Library Photo Collection, part of the Security Pacific National Bank Collection, dated 1892

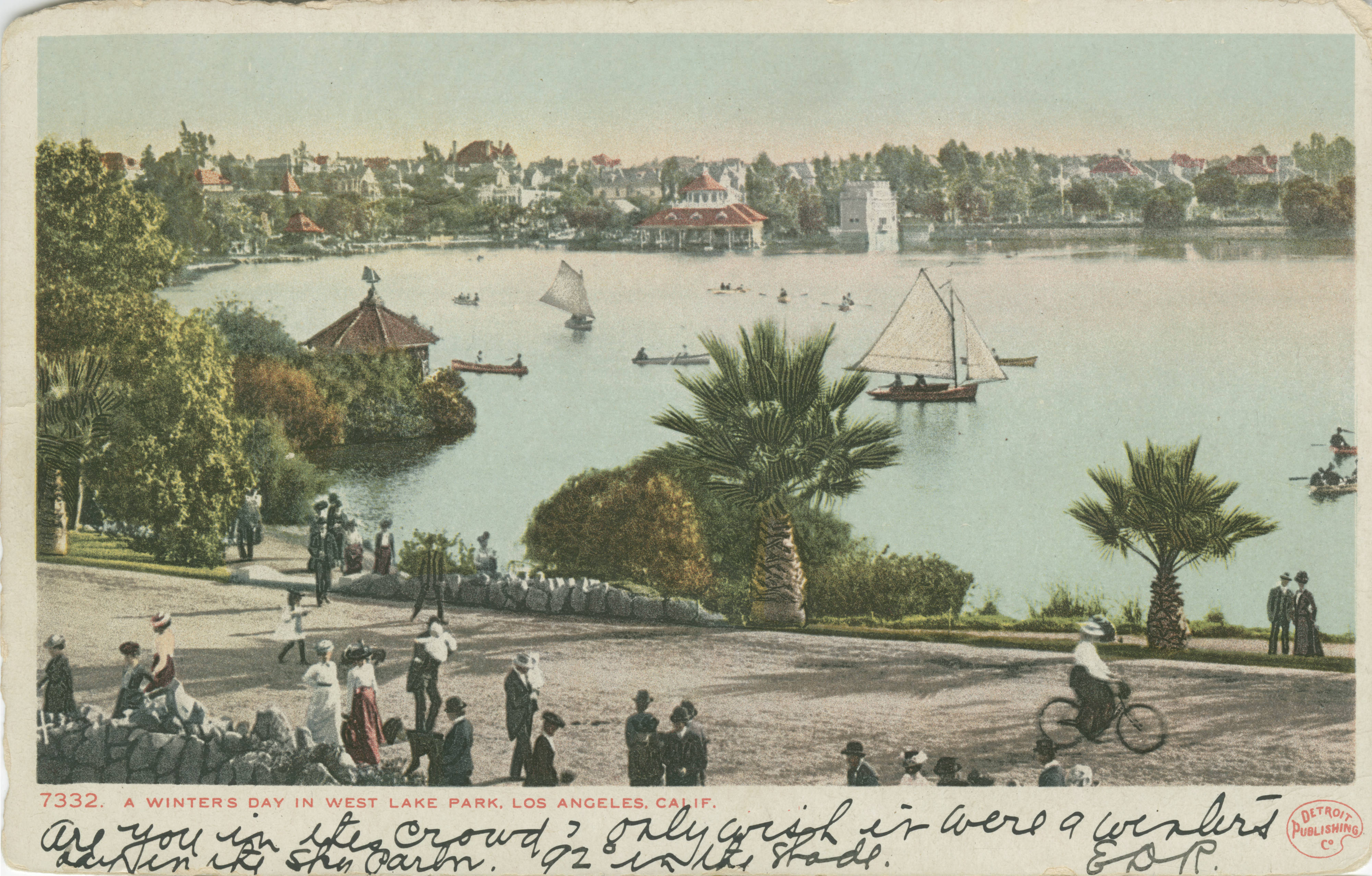
Postcard view from the 1900s

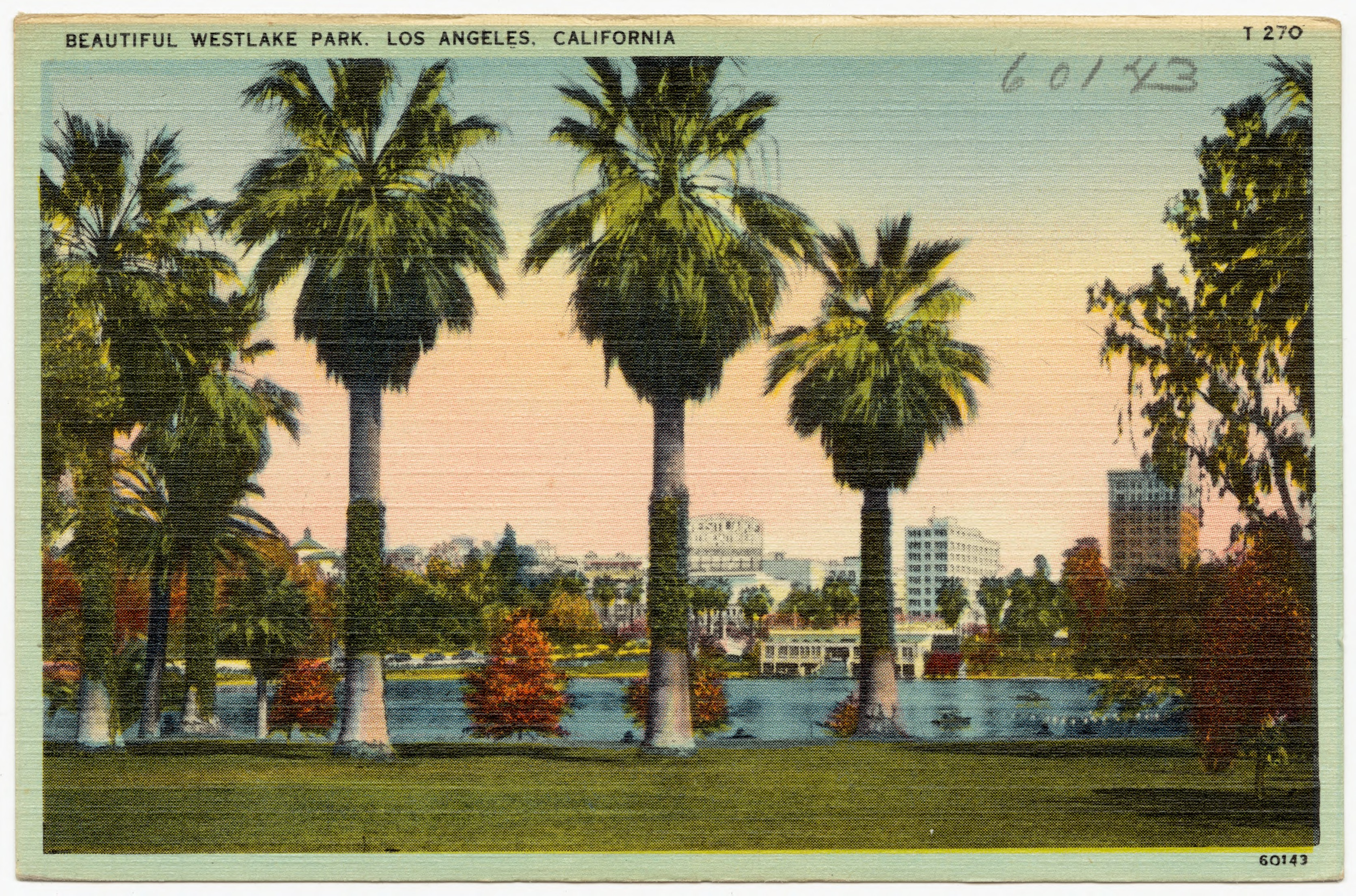
Postcard, circa 1930 to 1945

The park, originally named Westlake Park, was built in the 1880s, along with a similar Eastlake Park, whose lake is artificial, in Los Angeles. Westlake Park was renamed May 7, 1942; Eastlake Park was renamed Lincoln Park. Both Westlake and Eastlake (as well as Echo Park) were built as drinking water reservoirs connected to the city's system, Zanja Madre. When the city abandoned the non-pressurized zanja system for a pressurized pipe system, these smaller, shallow reservoirs located at low points no longer provided much benefit and were converted into parks.

The park was named for Henricus Wallace Westlake, a Canadian physician who had moved to Los Angeles around 1888, settled in the area and donated a portion of his property to the city for a park.

In the mid-19th century the area was a swampland; by the 1890s, it was a vacation destination, surrounded by luxury hotels. In the early part of the 20th century, the Westlake neighborhood became known as the Champs-Élysées of Los Angeles.

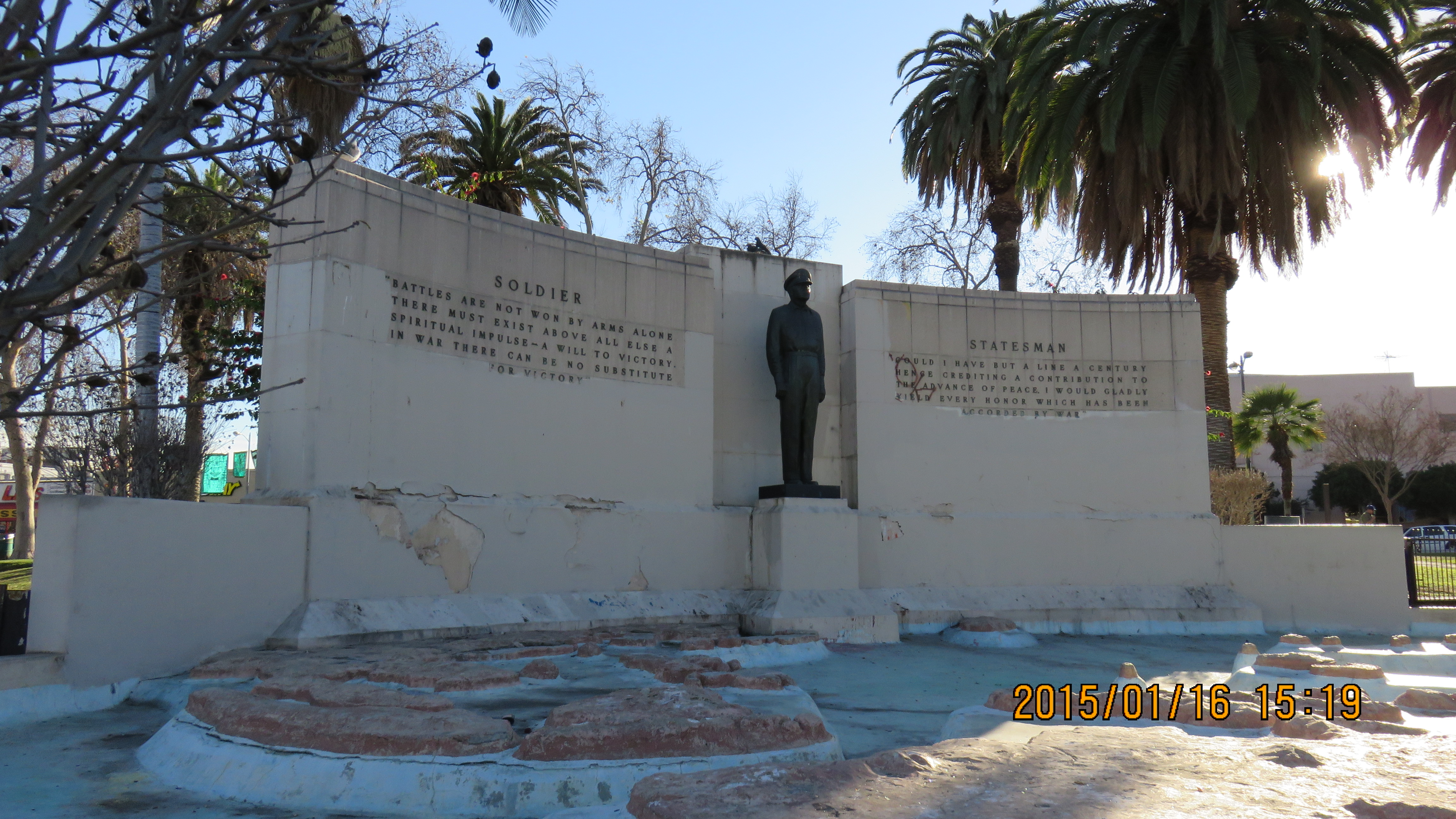
MacArthur Monument

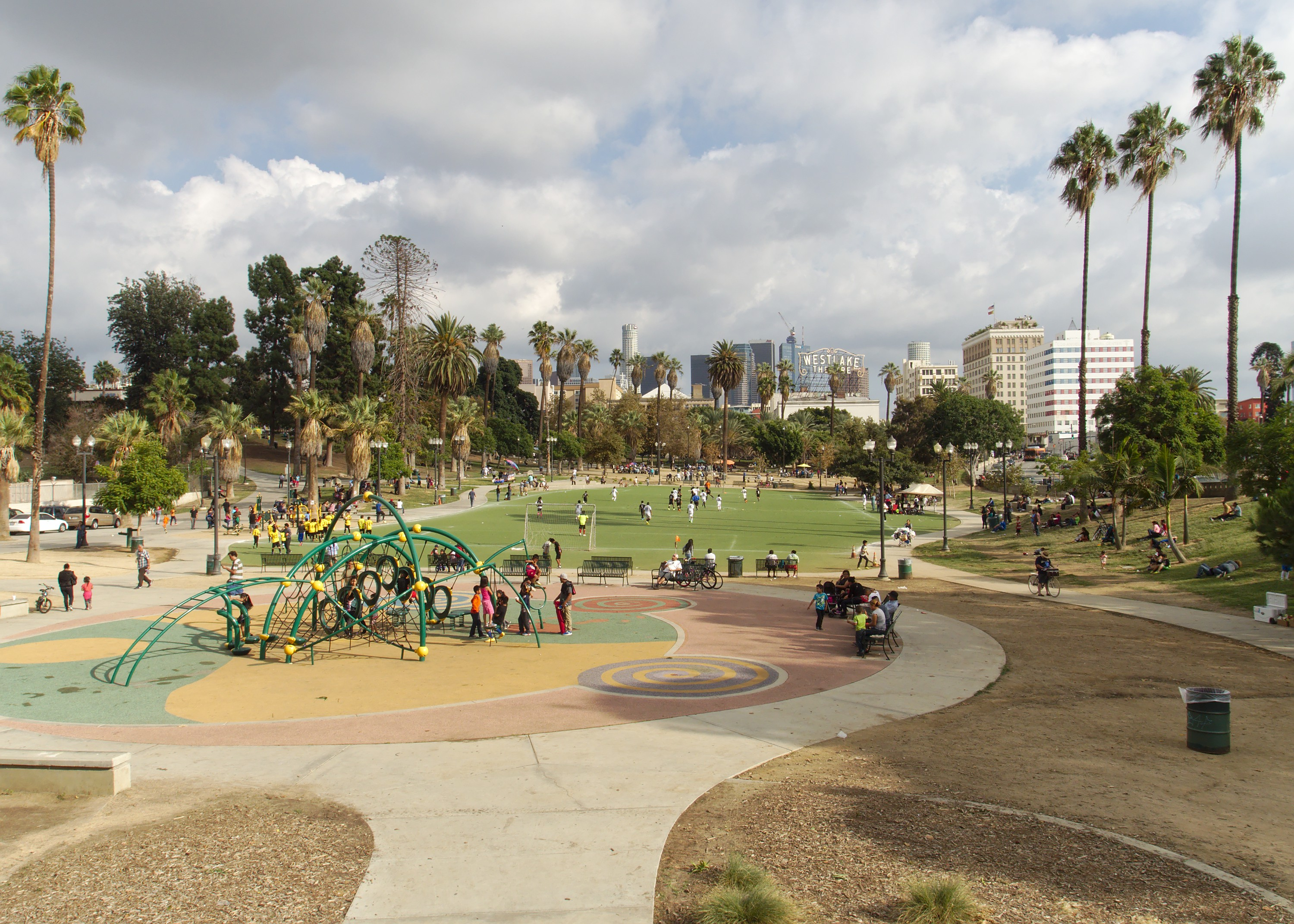
North half of park in 2015

Wilshire Boulevard formerly ended at the lake, but in 1934 a berm was built for it to cross and link up with the existing Orange Street (which ran from Alvarado to Figueroa Streets) into downtown Los Angeles. Orange Street was renamed Wilshire and extended east of Figueroa Street to Grand Avenue. This divided the lake into two halves; the northern one was subsequently drained. From the 1940s, the lake featured the rental of electric boats, with the names of comic book animal characters.

According to a Los Angeles Times news story from 1956, two swans, named Rudie and Susie, hatched their five new cygnets on the island in MacArthur Park Lake, and according to the park superintendent, these were the first swans born in the park in over a decade.

For many years, Filipino World War II veterans protested in the park named after their former commander regarding promises made when they enlisted that the United States had reneged on.

In 2009 as part of the stimulus package, Congress awarded lump-sum payments of $15,000 to Filipino veterans who are American citizens and $9,000 to those who are noncitizens.

The area around the park hosted the poorest immigrants in the 1980s and is known as the Ellis Island of the west. MacArthur Park experienced violence after 1985 with prostitution, drug dealing, and shoot-outs, with as many as 30 murders in 1990. When the lake was drained in 1973 and 1978, hundreds of handguns and other firearms were found disposed of in the lake.

=== May Day Mêlée with the Los Angeles Police Department ===
Two May Day rallies calling for U.S. citizenship for undocumented immigrants were held at MacArthur Park on May 1, 2007. When the protest overflowed onto city streets, police drove motorcycles through the crowd, then ordered the crowd to disperse. Some people began throwing plastic bottles and rocks at officers. After community mobilization, pressure from the Mayor, and an extensive internal review, LAPD Chief William Bratton apologized, the commanding officer was demoted, seventeen other officers faced penalties, and the LAPD paid more than $13 million in damages.

=== Redevelopment ===
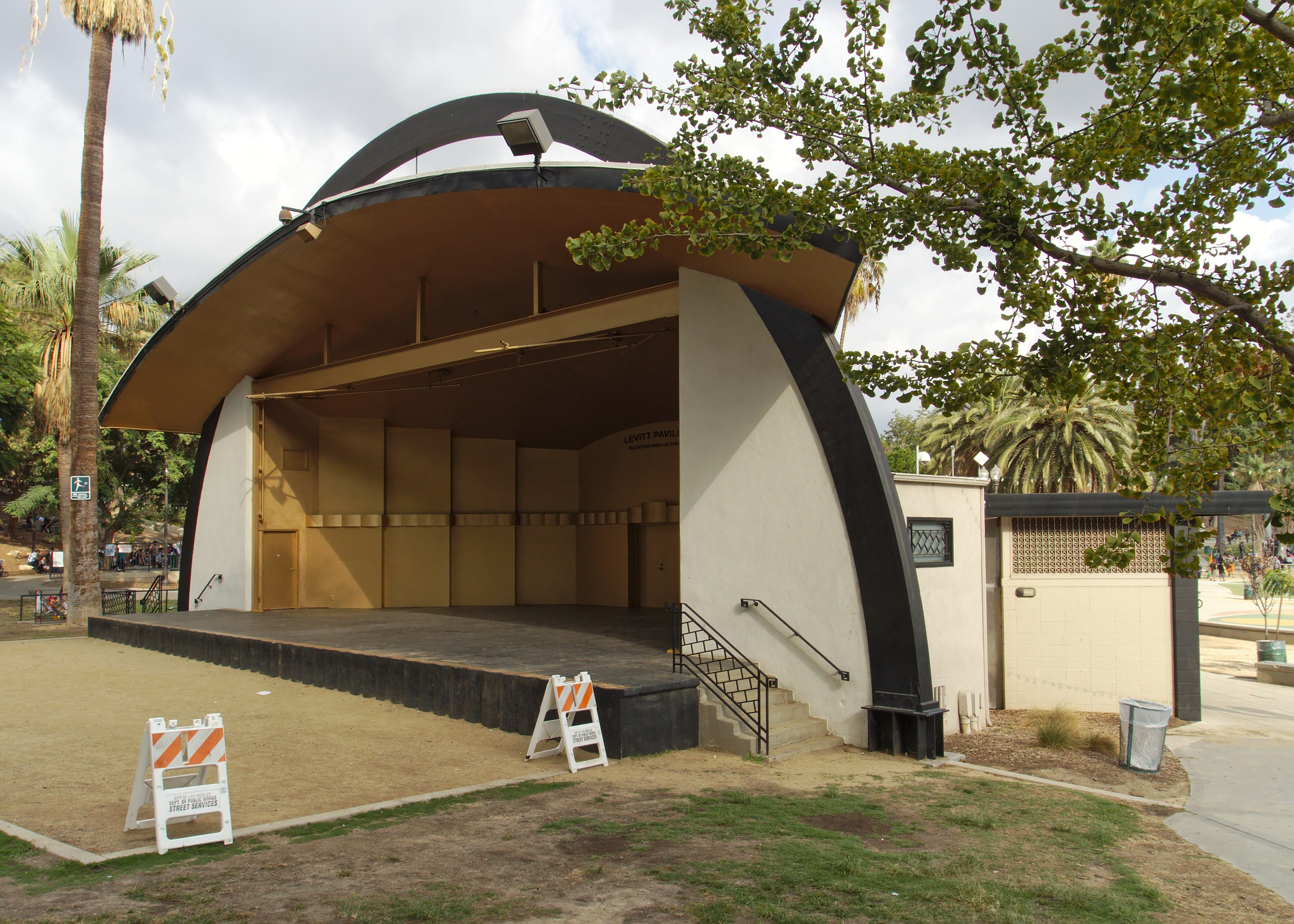
Levitt Pavilion bandshell

Beginning in 2002, the Los Angeles Police Department and business and community leaders led a redevelopment effort that has led to the installation of surveillance cameras, the opening of a recreation center, increased business, early-morning drink vendors, a new Metro station, the return of the paddle boats and the fountain, and large community festivals attracting thousands. Along with determined campaigns to improve community relations between the neighborhood and the police, crime rates went down through the mid-2000s.

In 2007, Levitt Pavilion Los Angeles opened, offering 50 free concerts each summer and attracting a wide range of audiences from around the country and globally. Notable acts that performed included Celso Pina, Fishbone, Bomba Estereo, La Sonora Dinamita, Jimmy Webb, Kinky, La Resistencia, and Nortec Collective. The paddle boats returned. They were available for rent on the weekends in 2009. By early 2010, the boathouse was closed. Eventually, the paddle boats were removed. The boathouse was demolished in 2014.

The MacArthur Park bandshell was painted by local artists and graffiti artists under the direction of Otis Parsons. Some of the artists involved were: Robert Williams, Skill, John "Zender" Estrada, Hector "Hex" Rios, Geo, Exit, Trip, Hate Prime, Relic, Galo "MAKE" Canote, RickOne and others. Some of the artwork was featured in the book Spraycan Art by Henry Chalfant and Jim Prigoff.

The lakeside portion of the park closed for 10 weeks in October 2021.

=== Crime ===
The area surrounding MacArthur Park, one of the poorest areas of Los Angeles, has widely reported crime rates. Considered to be MS-13 territory, many poorer locals of the area, especially those doing illicit business in the park, are forced to pay a "tax" to the gang in exchange for being left alone. In 2021, multiple attacks on transgender sex workers in the park led to increased police presence and were widely reported. These attacks have continued in the wider MacArthur Park neighborhood and were reported as recently as April 2025.

=== ICE and Customs agents in July 2025 ===
On July 7, 2025, ICE and Customs agents descended on MacArthur Park with US 1-18th Cavalry providing mounted mobile security and Joint Force Land Component Command (JFLCC) to support ICE and CBP, in a security operation codenamed Operation Excalibur, prompting a visit to the park by Los Angeles mayor Karen Bass. During her visit, an Assistant Chief Border Patrol Agent connected her with Border Patrol Sector Chief Greg Bovino on the phone who was leading enforcement efforts in Los Angeles at the time. He later posted on social media that this would not be the last time immigration agents would be at the park. Roughly 90 Guardsmen joined the federal agencies in a "show of force" at a largely empty park for an hour before leaving. Defense officials stated it was not a military operation, but acknowledged the size and scope could make it look like one to the public. Some agents pointed weapons at journalists and other observers.

=== Fencing ===
The conceptual phase of a proposed fence around the park was approved by the Los Angeles Board of Recreation and Park Commissioners in October 2025.

== In popular culture ==
MacArthur Park has been used as a filming location numerous times.

=== Movies ===
In Hard Luck (1921), Buster Keaton eludes the police by posing with a statue in the park.

In A Woman of Paris (1923), Charlie Chaplin uses the north side of the park and the Ansonia in two scenes.

MacArthur Park/Westlake Park and its boats figure prominently as the scene of a murder in the 1949 film noir Too Late for Tears (also known as Killer Bait) with Lizabeth Scott, Don DeFore, Dan Duryea, and Arthur Kennedy.

In the 2000 film Scream 3, MacArthur Park can be seen from John Milton's office.

In the 2011 film Drive, Ryan Gosling and Carey Mulligan live at The MacArthur on S. Park View Street, across from the MacArthur Park. A scene takes place in the park involving Gosling, Christina Hendricks, and Oscar Isaac.

=== Television ===
In 1973, an episode of the TV horror anthology series Circle of Fear, "The Phantom of Herald Square", included a significant number of scenes filmed within the park, as well as the Dragnet episode "The Bank Examiner Swindle", Spider-Man (1977), and "72 Hours", an episode of The Fresh Prince of Bel-Air, wherein Carlton plans to conduct illegal sales of counterfeit merchandise in the park, hoping to prove his street cred to Will and his friends.

=== Music ===
In 1989, the cover for N.W.A.'s single “Straight Outta Compton” was photographed on the north side of the park by Ithaka Darin Pappas. The photograph itself, entitled "The Bleacher Shot" (featuring group members Dr. Dre, DJ Yella, Eazy-E, Ice Cube and MC Ren) also appeared in Vikki Tobak's 2022 book Ice Cold: A Hip-Hop Jewelry History" published by Taschen.

The park is featured in the Gym Class Heroes music video for the "As Cruel as School Children" version of "Cupid's Chokehold" and Lorde's 2017 music video for "Green Light".

The 1968 hit song "MacArthur Park", written by Jimmy Webb and originally recorded by Richard Harris (later famously covered by Donna Summer), was inspired by this location. The cover was used by Team USA figure skater Alysa Liu in her gold-winning free skate during the Women's Event in the 2026 Winter Olympics in Milan.

=== Additional ===
The movie In MacArthur Park (1976) was written and directed by Bruce Schwartz.

In an episode of Curb Your Enthusiasm, the park is humorously suggested as a place to visit by a hotel concierge.

In the 2001 film Training Day, MacArthur Park is mentioned by Ethan Hawke's character Jake Hoyt.

Appears as a discoverable landmark for players in 2011's L.A. Noire.

== See also ==
- List of parks in Los Angeles
- List of places named for Douglas MacArthur
- Langer's Deli
- Statue of Óscar Romero
