= MacArthur Monument (Los Angeles) =

Memorial in Los Angeles, California, U.S.

- Location: Los Angeles, California, U.S.
- 34°3′26.5″N 118°16′39.4″W

The MacArthur Monument is a monument in Los Angeles' MacArthur Park, in the U.S. state of California. The statue of Douglas MacArthur was modeled by Roger Noble Burnham and the memorial was designed by Harold Field Kellogg. The monument was vandalized in the 1980s and surveyed by the Smithsonian Institution's "Save Outdoor Sculpture!" program in 1995.

The monument features a decorative pool shaped as the western Pacific Ocean, memorializing the Pacific War and MacArthur's leapfrogging campaigns. The pool is currently drained.

== See also ==
- MacArthur Memorial – burial site in Norfolk, Virginia
- MacArthur Monument (West Point)
