= La Resistencia (Venezuela) =

Venezuelan decentralized protest movement

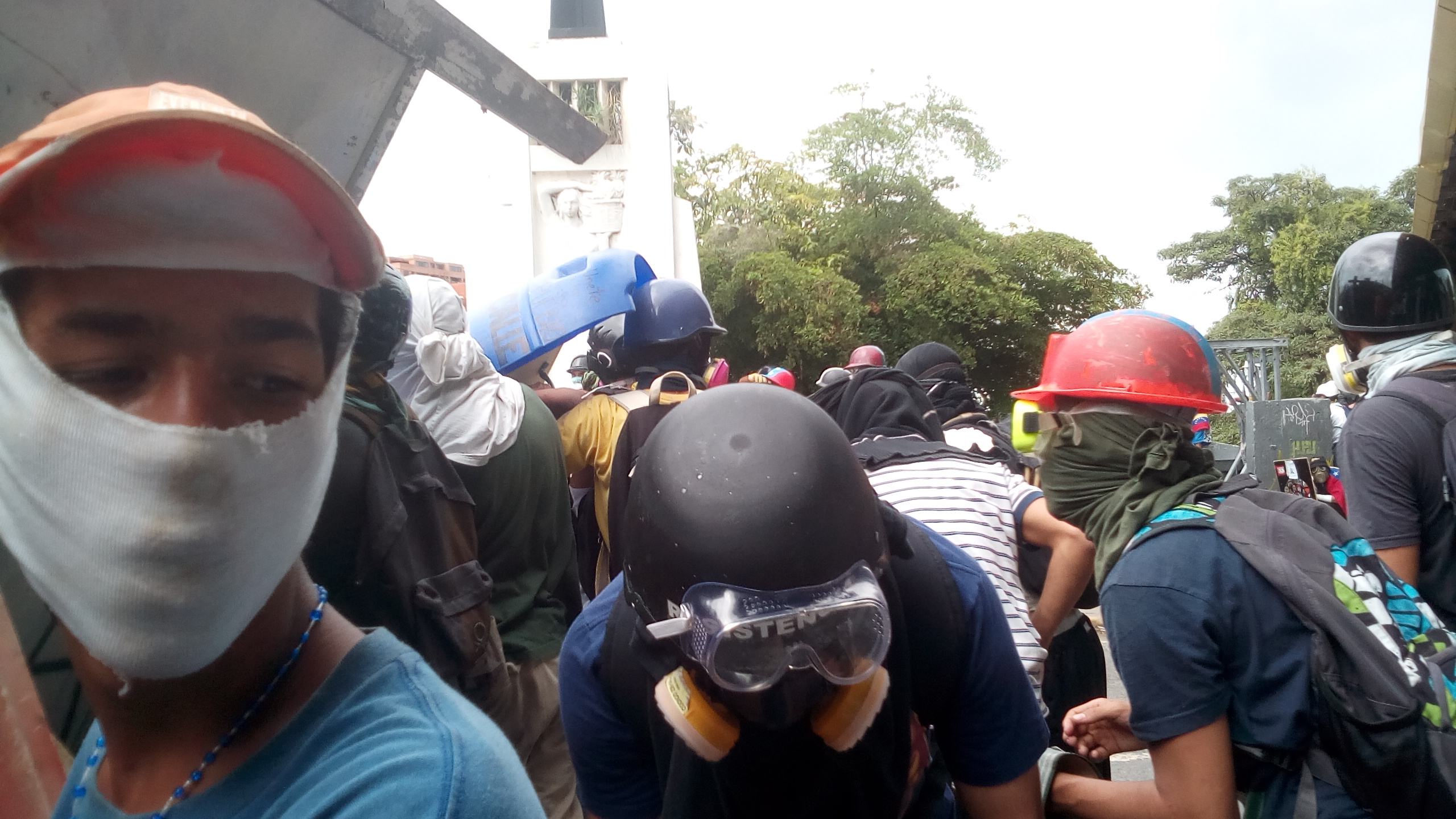
Protesters protecting themselves from rubber bullets.

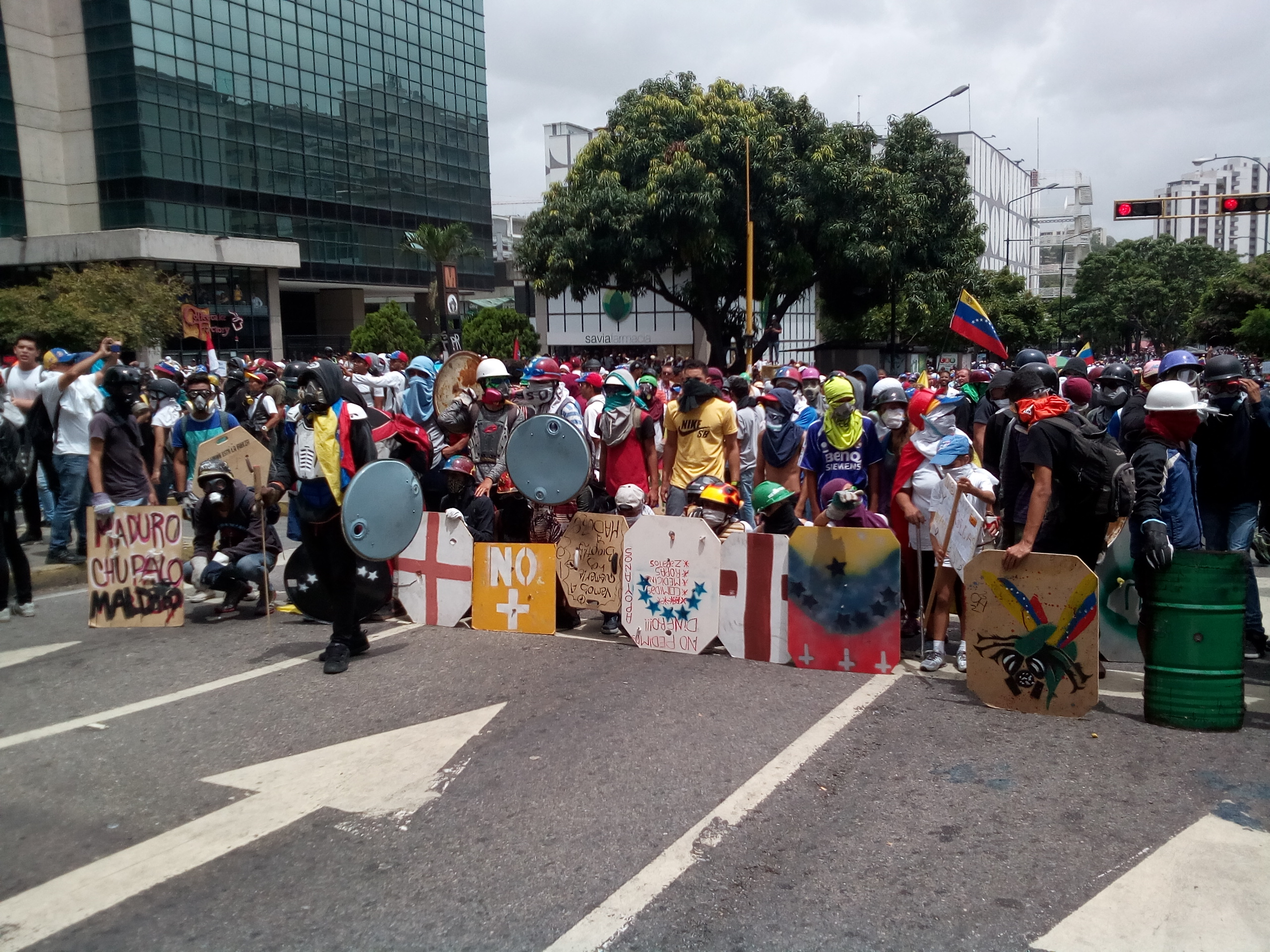
Demonstrators bearing shields at a protest.

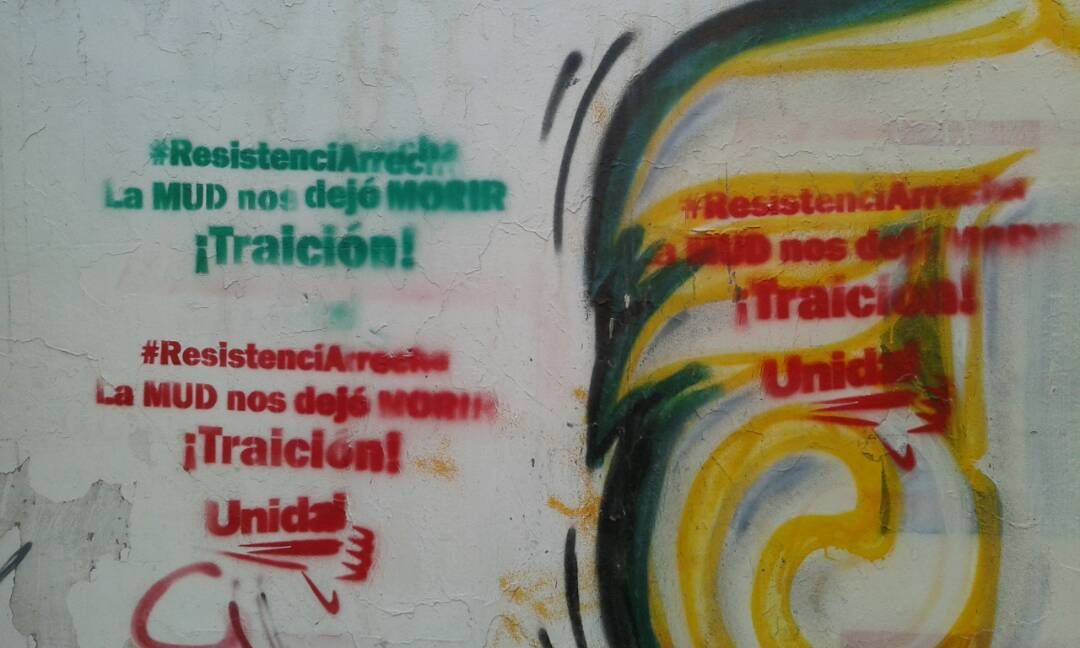
"#ResistenciArrecha. The MUD let us DIE. Treason!", graffitis expressing anger at the opposition coalition after the end of the 2017 protests.

La Resistencia (lit. 'Resistance') is a Venezuelan decentralized array of organized groups that confront security forces during protests that aim to defend other protesters from the authorities' response. Some former Venezuelan security forces have taught Resistencia members riot formations and other government methods.

== In popular culture ==
The 2018 documentary film El país roto, directed by Melissa Silva Franco, features interviews to Resistencia members.

In 2019, Venezuelan journalist and writer Carleth Morales published the book 26 crímenes y una crónica. Quién mató a la resistencia en Venezuela (lit. '26 crimes and a chronicle. Who killed the resistance in Venezuela'). The book features the testimonies of the relatives of 26 young Venezuelans killed during the 2017 protests.

== See also ==
- Antifa (United States)
- Guarimba
- Neomar Lander
