= La Resistencia (film) =

- Directed by: Daniel Pires Mateus
- Written by: Daniel Pires Mateus
- Cinematography: Horacio Maira; Arsenio Reinaldo Pica
- Edited by: Jorge Levillotti; Jorge H. Quiroga
- Music by: Astor Piazzolla
- Release date: 1972
- Running time: 18 min
- Country: Argentina
- Language: Spanish

La Resistencia is an 18 minute-long 1972 Argentine short film, written and directed by Daniel Pires Mateus with cinematography by Horacio Maria and Arsenio Reinaldo Pica, music by Astor Piazzolla. The film was edited by Jorge Levillotti and Jorge H. Quiroga and supervised by Lucas Demare.

== Cast ==
- Néstor Ducó
- Pascual Pelliciota
- Juan Carlos Puppo
- Rubén Santagada
- Humberto Serrano
- Juan Carlos Torres
- Oscar Veronese

== See also ==
- List of Argentine films of 1972
