= Geraldin Moreno =

Venezuelan protester murdered during the 2017 protests

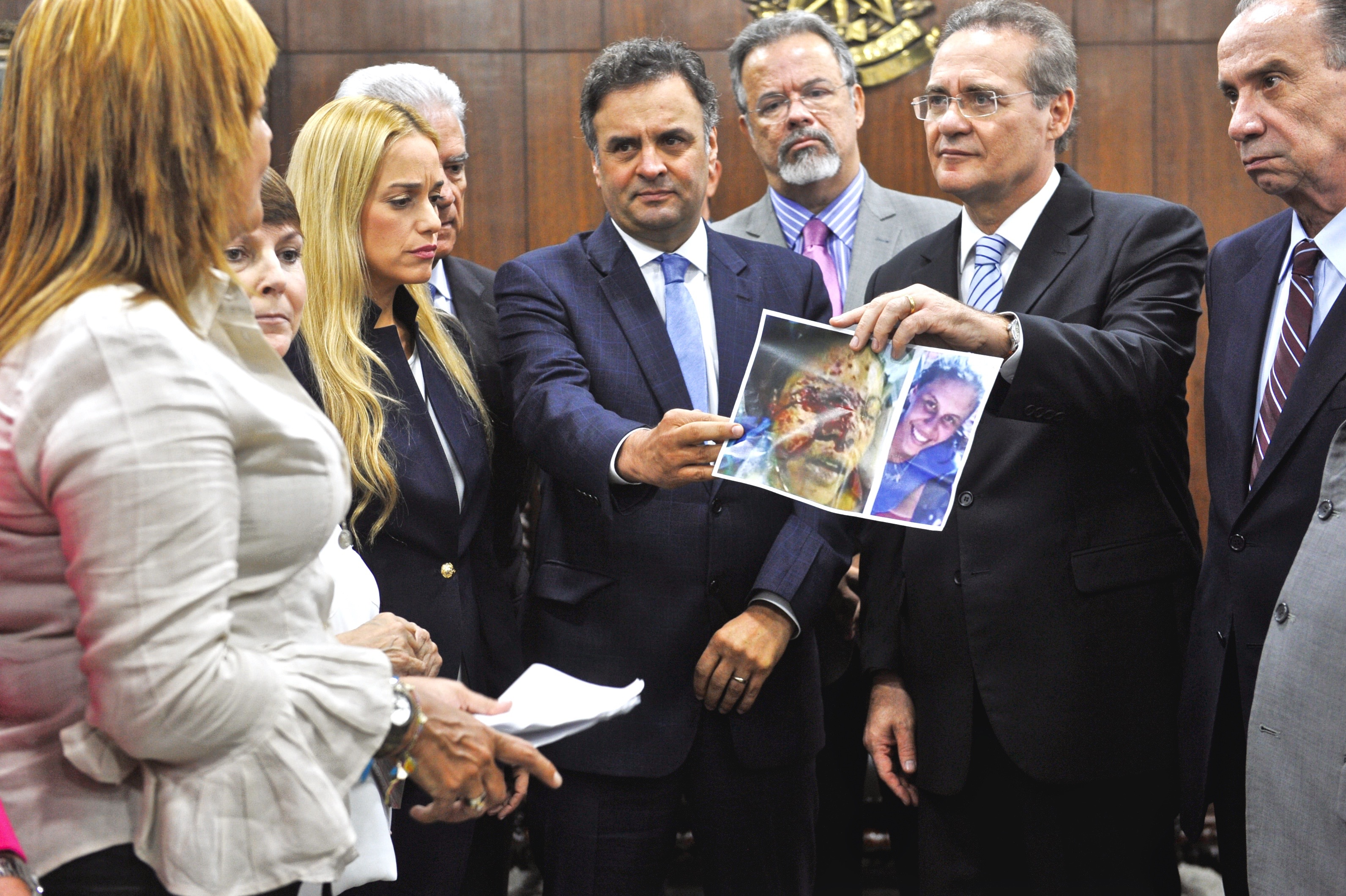
- Lilian Tintori and Brazilian senators show a photo of Geraldin Moreno killed by a Bolivarian National Guardsman
- Born: Geraldin Moreno Orozco c. 1990
- Died: 22 February 2014; Naguanagua, Venezuela
- Parent: Rosa Orozco

Geraldin Moreno Orozco (c. 1990-22 February 2014) was a Venezuelan protester murdered during the 2014 Venezuelan protests.

== Murder ==
On 19 February 2014, at eight in the morning, a cacerolazo was called upon in Naguanagua, in Carabobo state. Six motorcycles from the National Guard arrived firing and Moreno ran along with other protesters. Sergeant Second Class Francisco Caridad Barroso fired a shot, which hit Geraldin in the body; Another sergeant, Albin Bonilla, fired a shot that hit her in the face, causing her to fall on her back, and immediately afterwards shot a third time again directly at Geraldin's face, urged by another colleague who, according to witnesses, shouted "do it, do it". Her cousin, Liseth Madía, declared that the pellets fired were not made of plastic as supposed, but of iron. The driver of the motorcycle, Alexander López Vargas, told the Public Ministry that Alvín Rojas admitted to having shot "that damn woman." Moreno died three days later on 22 February. The cause of death was "Herniation of cerebellar tonsils and cardio-respiratory arrest due to hemorrhage, brain and eye injuries and cerebral edema due to skull-facial fractures due to multiple projectile gunshot facial-cranial wounds."

== Investigations ==
By February 2015, among the 43 deaths, only four were being investigated: that of Bassil Da Costa, that of José Alejandro Márquez, that of Geraldin Moreno and Adriana Urquiola, and none had been solved. At least 25 National Guardsmen were involved in Geraldin's murder, but only four were presented in the case, of which two were detained and the other two were under presentation regime. A year after her death, the trial had not started and had been deferred eight times. In 2016 Albin Bonilla Rojas was sentenced to thirty years in prison for the death of Geraldin Moreno, the maximum penalty in Venezuela, while Sergeant Francisco Caridad was sentenced to 16 years and 6 months in prison. Other members of the detachment, accomplices of the events, including Lieutenant Colonel Frank Osura, received promotions and decorations after the killing.

== Legacy ==
Naguanagua Mayor Alejandro Feo La Cruz paid tribute to those who had died during protests in Carabobo, naming a park "Geraldin Moreno Park" and named an avenue after another protester, Génesis Carmona.

== See also ==
- Timeline of the 2014 Venezuelan protests
- Bassil Da Costa
- Robert Redman
- Génesis Carmona
- Marvinia Jiménez
- Kluivert Roa
