= Ángel Vivas =

Venezuelan Brigadier General (born 1956)

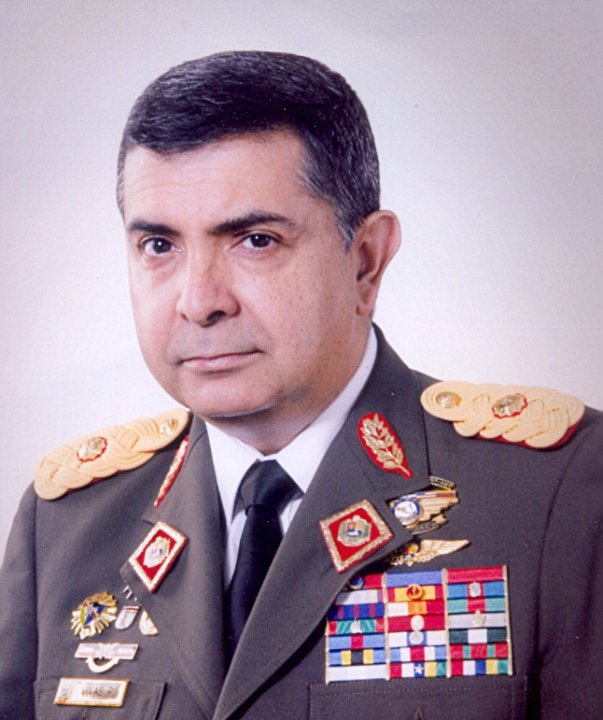
- Brigadier General Ángel Vivas
- Born: October 10, 1956 (age 69); San Cristóbal, Republic of Venezuela
- Allegiance: Venezuela
- Branch: Venezuelan Army
- Rank: Brigadier General

Ángel Omar Vivas Perdomo is a Venezuelan Brigadier General. He has made himself known as an outspoken opponent of the politicization of the Venezuelan Armed Forces, by going to the supreme court to challenge the introduction of a war cry originally created by Fidel Castro, as the motto for the military in Venezuela. He was arrested, prosecuted, and on 1 March 2012, sentenced to 4 months and 15 days in jail for having challenged the motto in court. On 7 April 2017, he was arrested again during a SEBIN operation that tricked him into helping a young man that hit his car into the front door of his house, three years after a detention order was published during the 2014 Venezuelan protests.

== Background ==
General Vivas was born in San Cristóbal on 10 October 1956. In 1978 he graduated from the military academy, and in 1988 he graduated as civil engineer. He went on to study "Planning and Transport Organization" in London, United Kingdom. In 1997 the Organization of American States appointed him commander of the multinational mission MARMINCA in Central America, an operation for mine clearing in the former war-ravaged countries. In 2002 he obtained an MBA in UNET, and in 2006 a doctorate in Business Administration in Finance at the Texan American University. In Venezuela he has held positions such as Finance Director of the Army, and Director of Engineering at the Defense Ministry. He has 35 military decorations from Venezuela, Nicaragua, Honduras, Panama, Costa Rica, Guatemala, and the United States.

== Objection to political use of military ==
On 18 August 2006, General Vivas was appointed National Director of Engineering at the Defense Ministry, but already on 24 January the following year he decided to hand in his resignation from the post due to "grave violations of the Venezuelan Constitution", according to his own declaration. On 15 May 2008, Vivas petitioned the Supreme Court requesting that it eliminate from use in the Venezuela armed forces the motto created by Fidel Castro, “Patria, socialismo o muerte. Venceremos!” ("Fatherland, socialism or death. We will triumph!"). He suggested the military could instead use a phrase uttered by Venezuela's independence hero Francisco Miranda, "Muera la tiranía! Viva la libertad!" ("Death to tyranny! Long live liberty!").

When leaving the court he was arrested by the military intelligence and interrogated for nine hours. He was later charged with insubordination and charges that were not even specified, plus he was forbidden to speak publicly about the case according to his lawyer, who considered it a clear case of political persecution. In his defense on 28 April 2010, he accused all of his accusers of treason to their oaths of office. On 1 March 2012, General Vivas was sentenced to 4 months and 15 days of prison by the military court in Caracas.

The International Crisis Group made reference to General Vivas's court motion and detention while observing that the introduction of the motto in question is a flagrant violation of the apolitical character of the armed forces. General Vivas received online support from other militaries in Venezuela and Honduras, although for obvious reasons this support is routinely expressed anonymously.

== Arrest ==
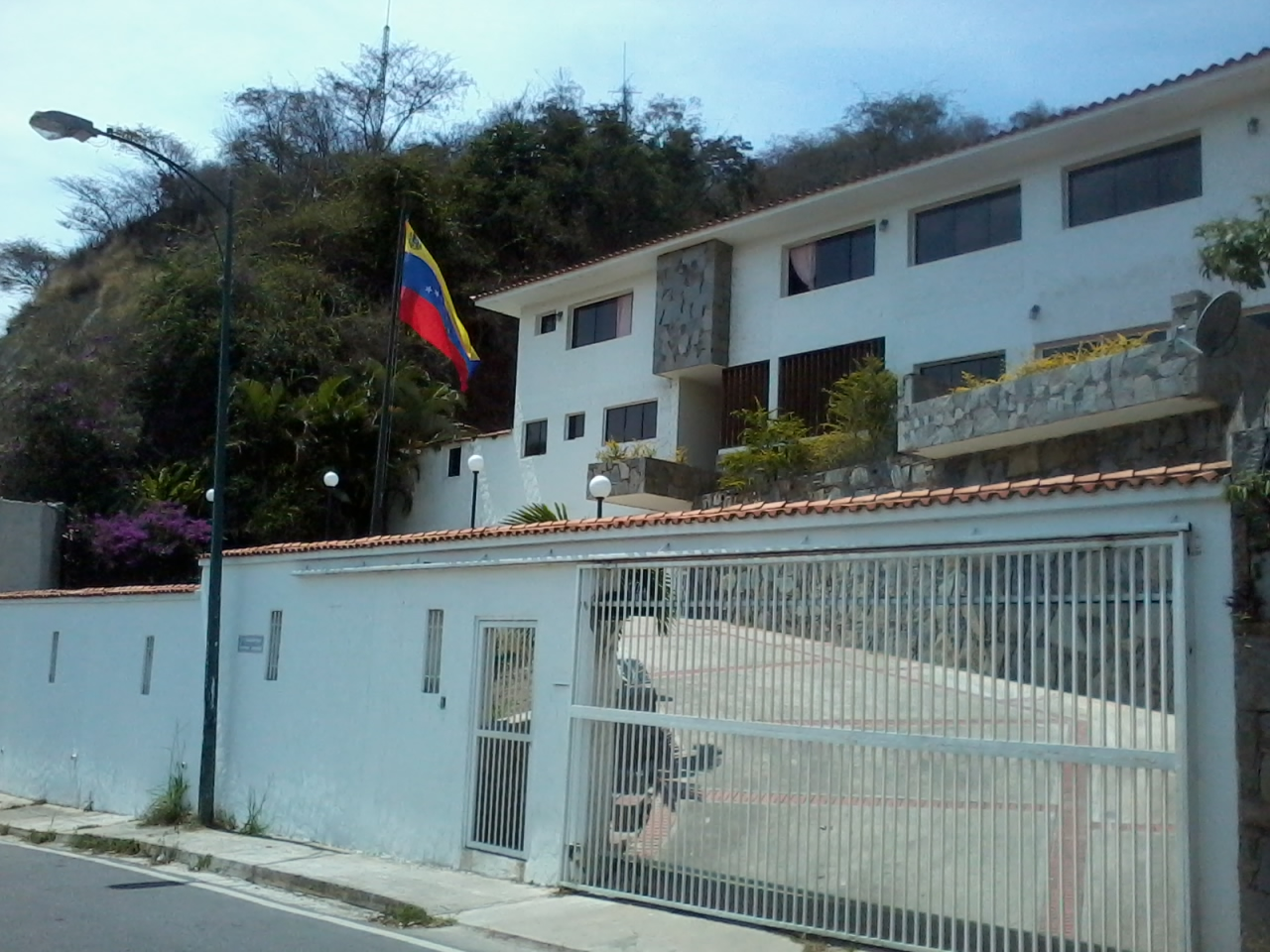
Ángel Vivas' residence in Caracas

During the 2014 Venezuela protests, Vivas tweeted that wires should be hung across streets as a defense against pro-government colectivos. The Venezuelan government issued an arrest order against him afterwards.

On 7 April 2017, General Vivas was arrested again during a SEBIN operation that tricked him into helping a young man that hit his car into the front door of his house, three years after a detention order was issued during the 2014 protests. According to Vivas's family, he was beaten during his arrest. Among the reported injuries caused was a wound at the level of the temple, causing a partial loss of the left eye and a complete loss of hearing in the right ear, apparently affecting internal organs. Family members also reported that he lost several kilos of weight and expressed fear that he had a broken rib, due to a protuberance in the area. His wife declared that the injuries also included a fracture in his back, publishing a chest tomographic report describing fracture and displacement of the ninth intervertebral disc. The day after the beating, Vivas was presented before the 1st Military Control Court. The judge issued a transfer order to the Military Hospital, but security officials ignored it initially.

Vivas went for more than a month without receiving medical attention until he was transferred to the Military Hospital in Fort Tiuna on 19 May. He stayed in the hospital for a few hours, where his spine was immobilized with a corset with hook-and-loop fasteners, before being returned to El Helicoide. His wife described the treatment as a mockery. In July, the Public Ministry filed an injunction for Vivas' state of health, stating about his spine fracture.

He was released from El Helicoide on 1 June 2018. By October 2018, following his release, Ángel Vivas had undergone four surgeries for his spinal injury, and by then he was considering having a fifth one performed.

== Personal life ==
General Vivas is married to Estrella de Vivas; they have three daughters.

== See also ==
- Political prisoners in Venezuela
- Torture in Venezuela
