= 2014 Venezuelan protests =

Series of protests in Venezuela

- Part of Protests against Nicolás Maduro
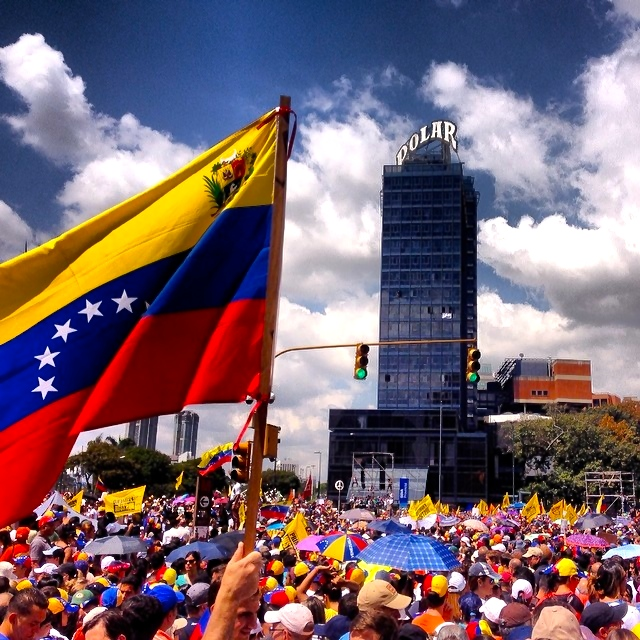
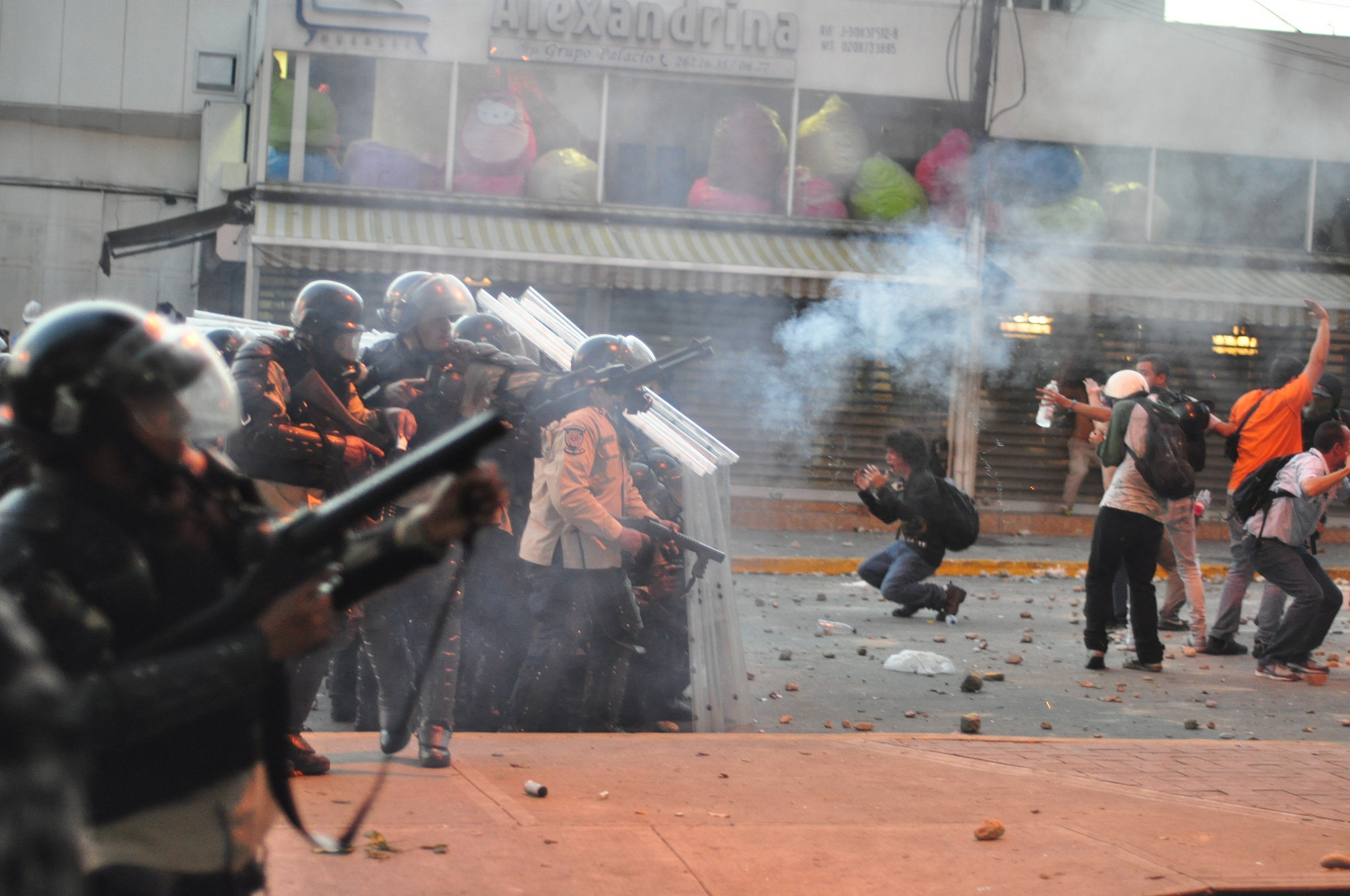
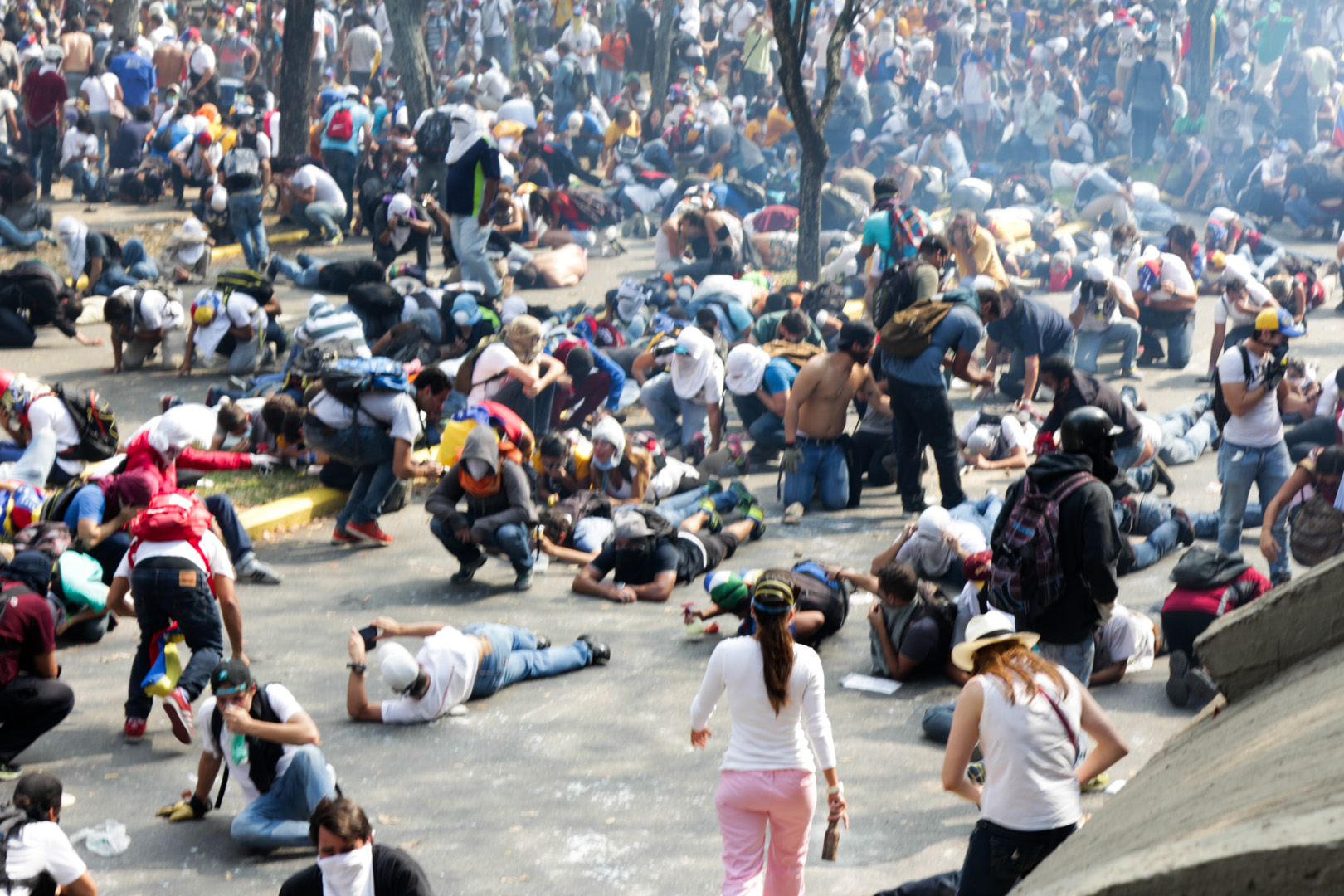
- Images from top to bottom and from left to right: Opposition march in Caracas on 12 February, National Guardsmen responding with tear gas, demonstrators covering from tear gas at the Central University of Venezuela.
- Date: 12 February – 8 May 2014 (2 months, 3 weeks and 5 days)
- Location: Venezuela
- Caused by: Crisis in Venezuela
- Result: Negotiations between government and opposition; 243 arrests and at least five camp sites in Caracas taken down on 8 May; Smaller protests continue; Opposition wins parliamentary elections on 6 December 2015

Parties
Venezuelan opposition: Democratic Unity Roundtable; Popular Will; Justice First; A New Era; Democratic Action; Copei; Movimiento Estudiantil (Student opposition organization); Resistencia; Anti-government protesters: Anti-government students	Government of Venezuela: Bolivarian National Armed Forces (FANB); Venezuelan National Guard; Bolivarian National Police; Bolivarian National Intelligence Service; Great Patriotic Pole; United Socialist Party of Venezuela; Communist Party of Venezuela; People's Electoral Movement; Tupamaro; Pro-government paramilitaries: Colectivos; Units of Battle Hugo Chávez; Pro-government demonstrators: Pro-government students

Lead figures
Leopoldo López; David Smolansky; María Corina Machado; Juan Requesens; Henrique Capriles; Antonio Ledezma; Lilian Tintori; Freddy Guevara; Daniel Ceballos; Patricia Gutiérrez; Carlos Ocariz; Ramón Guillermo Aveledo; Ángel Vivas; Andrés Velásquez; Lorent Saleh	Nicolás Maduro; Jorge Arreaza; Diosdado Cabello; Miguel Rodríguez Torres; Elías Jaua; Luisa Ortega Díaz; Carmen Meléndez; José Vielma Mora; Tareck El Aissami; Jorge Rodríguez; Francisco Ameliach; Aristóbulo Istúriz; Rafael Ramírez; Adán Chávez; Delcy Rodríguez; Robert Serra

Number
Hundreds of thousands: Tens of thousands of student protesters	Hundreds of thousands of pro-government demonstrators

Casualties
- Deaths: 43
- Injuries: 5,285
- Arrested: 3,689

In 2014, a series of protests, political demonstrations, and civil insurrection began in Venezuela due to the country's high levels of urban violence, inflation, and chronic shortages of basic goods attributed to economic policies such as strict price controls. Mass protesting began in earnest in February following the attempted rape of a student on a university campus in San Cristóbal. Subsequent arrests and killings of student protesters spurred their expansion to neighboring cities and the involvement of opposition leaders. The year's early months were characterized by large demonstrations and violent clashes between protesters and government forces that resulted in nearly 4,000 arrests and 43 deaths, both supporters and opponents of the government as well as security personnel.

== Background ==
Since Hugo Chávez was elected President of Venezuela in 1998, he and his political ambitions proved to be controversial.

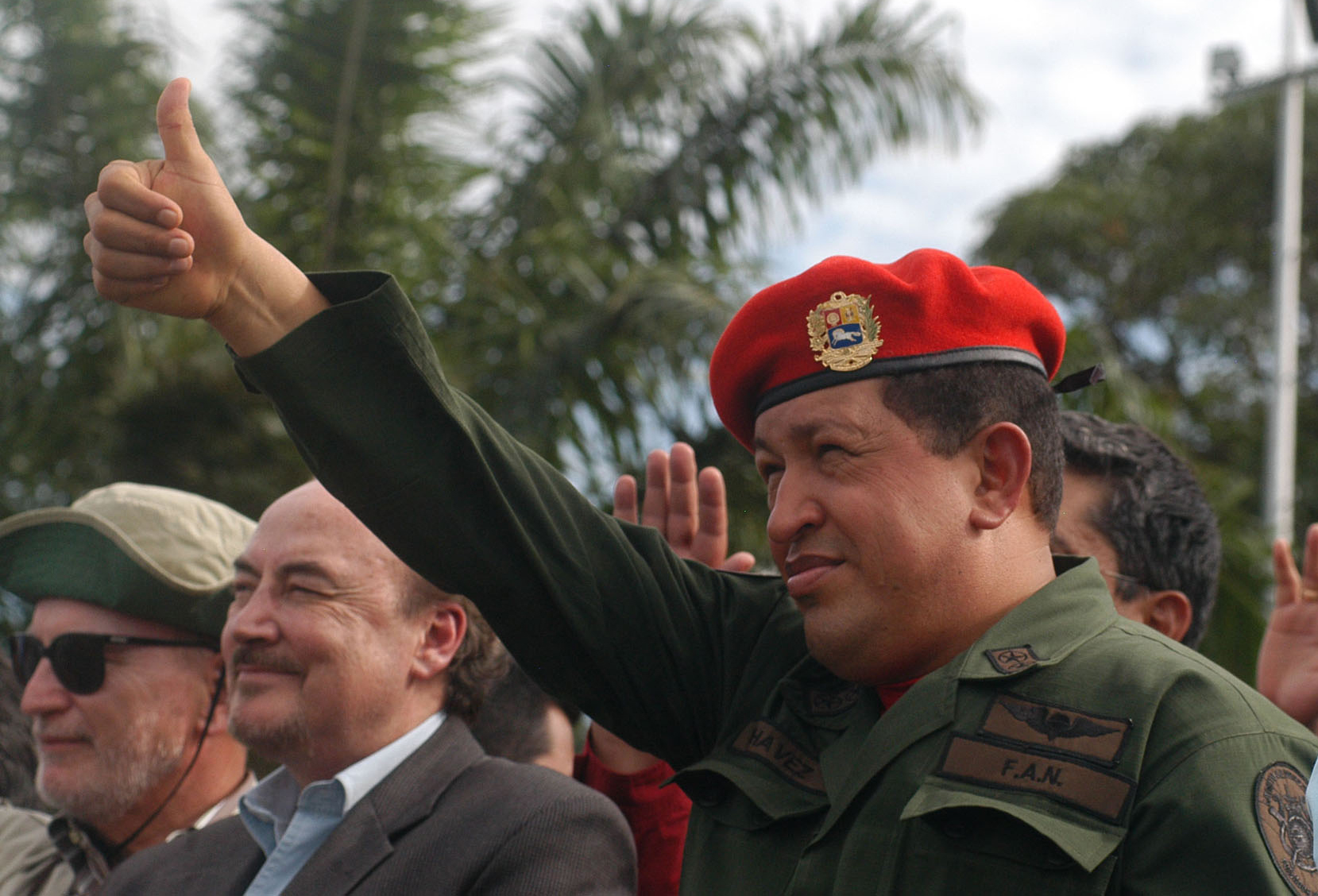
President Hugo Chávez in 2010

Under Chávez, oil revenues in the 2000s brought funds not seen in Venezuela since the 1980s, with Chávez's government becoming "semi-authoritarian and hyper-populist", investing heavily in public works which initially benefited Venezuelans. His government failed to save funds earned while oil prices were high and soon after his death, Venezuela's economy became dilapidated. Also under Chávez's tenure, corruption in Venezuela, as well as crime in Venezuela, had greatly increased, causing more frustration among Venezuelans.

Frustrations were seen in the polls when during the 2013 Venezuelan presidential election, Nicolas Maduro narrowly won the election with 50.6% of the vote, ahead of the 49.1% of candidate Henrique Capriles Radonski, surprisingly close compared to previous elections in the country. The opposition's defeat in the 8 December 2013 municipal elections, which it had framed as a 'plebiscite' on Maduro's presidency, would later ignite an internal debate over strategy. Moderate opposition leaders Henrique Capriles and Henri Falcón argued for 'unity' and dialogue with the government, and attended meetings held by the President to discuss cooperation among the country's mayors and governors. Other opposition leaders, such as Leopoldo López and Marina Corina Machado, opposed dialogue and called for a new strategy to force an immediate change in the government.

== Timeline ==
According to the Venezuelan Observatory of Social Conflict (OVCS), 9,286 protests occurred in 2014, the greatest number of protests occurring in Venezuela in decades. The majority of protests, 6,369 demonstrations, occurred during the first six months of 2014 with an average of 35 protests per day. SVCO estimated that 445 protests occurred in January; 2,248 in February; 1,423 in March; 1,131 in April; 633 in May; and 489 in June. The main reason of protest was against President Maduro and the Venezuelan government with 52% of demonstrations and the remaining 42% of protests were due to other difficulties such as labor, utilities, insecurity, education and shortages. Most protesting began in the first week of February, reaching peak numbers in the middle of that month following the call of students and opposition leaders to protest. The number of protests then declined into mid-2014 only to increase slightly in late 2014 into 2015 following the drop in the price of oil and due to the shortages in Venezuela.

=== Growing unrest ===
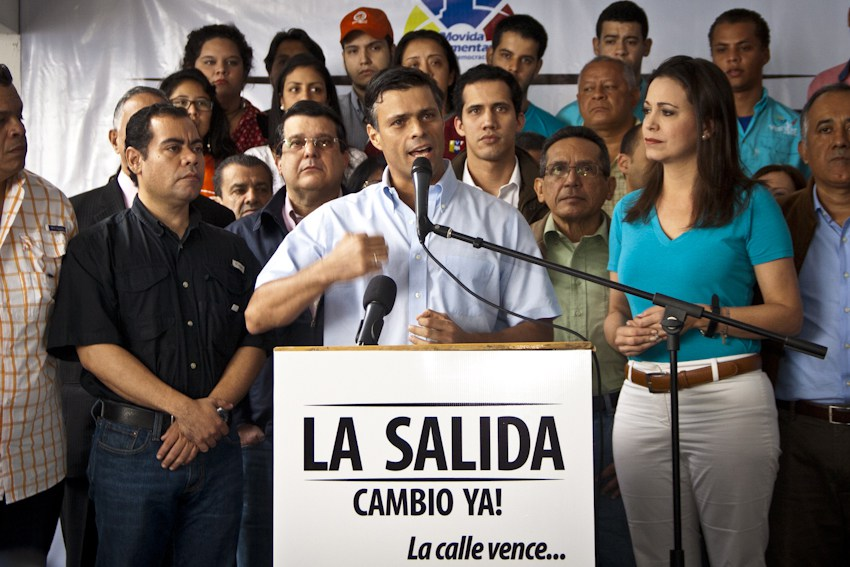
Leopoldo López and María Corina Machado, presenting La Salida initiative. Juan Guaidó is behind.

Demonstrations against violence in Venezuela began in January 2014 following the murder of actress and former Miss Venezuela Mónica Spear, and continued, when former presidential candidate Henrique Capriles shook the hand of President Maduro; this "gesture... cost him support and helped propel" opposition leader Leopoldo López Mendoza to the forefront.

According to the Associated Press, well before protests began in the Venezuelan capital city of Caracas, the attempted rape of a young student on a university campus in San Cristóbal, in the western border state of Táchira, led to protests from students "outraged" at "long-standing complaints about deteriorating security under President Nicolas Maduro and his predecessor, the late Hugo Chávez. But what really set them off was the harsh police response to their initial protest, in which several students were detained and allegedly abused, as well as follow-up demonstrations to call for their release". These protests expanded, attracted non-students, and led to more detentions; eventually, other students joined, and the protests spread to Caracas and other cities, with opposition leaders becoming involved.

Leopoldo López, a leading figure in the opposition to the government, began to lead protests. During events surrounding the 2002 Venezuelan coup d'état attempt, Lopez "orchestrated the public protests against Chávez and he played a central role in the citizen's arrest of Chavez's interior minister", Ramón Rodríguez Chacín, though he later tried to distance himself from the event, López, alongside María Corina Machado launch a campaign on 23 January 2014, named La Salida (The Exit), with an intent to have President Maduro resign through protests.

=== Mass demonstrations ===
On 1 February, López called upon students to protest peacefully against the scarcity, insecurity, and shortages. The next day, opposition leaders call for a march on 12 February in recognition of National Youth Day.

On 12 February, major opposition protests began with student marches led by opposition leaders in 38 cities across Venezuela simultaneous with the national celebrations for the bicentennial year anniversary of Youth Day and the Battle of La Victoria. After the protests, smaller groups remained and threw stones at government forces. The protests turned more violent after government security forces used excessive force on protesters and shot at groups of unarmed people. Bassil Da Costa was the first protester to die after getting a bullet to the head. Later that day, another protester, Robert Reddman, and a pro-government activist were also killed in Caracas. President Maduro blamed "fascist" groups for the deaths caused that day, including opposition leader Leopoldo López, during his closing address in the Youth Day parade that evening in La Victoria, Aragua state.

The next day on 13 February following the death of a colectivo member Juan "Juancho" Montoya, members of colectivos "went on television to call for calm and called for the arrest of opposition leader Leopoldo Lopez. Judge Ralenys Tovar Guillén accepts the Public Ministry's petition to detain Leopoldo López in connection with the unrest that resulted in the death of the colectivo leader and two students.

Leopoldo López delivers a speech on 18 February in Plaza Brión where he pointed out that its necessary to build "a peaceful exit, inside the constitution but in the streets" and assured that "there isn't free media anymore to express themselves and if the media stays silent they must go to the streets". He declared that "if his imprisonment allows Venezuela to wake up definitely and for the Venezuelans that want a change, his imprisonment will be worth it." He turned himself to the National Guard at 12:24 P.M., Venezuelan time, and said he was turning himself to a "corrupt justice". After Lopez turned himself in, the opposition protesters blocked the Francisco Fajardo Highway.

Pro-government colectivos fire upon the protest Génesis Carmona was participating in

Miss Tourism Venezuela Génesis Carmona was killed by colectivo gunfire on 19 February after being shot in the head while supporting an opposition protest. MUD leader Henrique Capriles breaks his silence and confronts Francisco Ameliach, government officials and denounced the violence the government was using on the protesters.

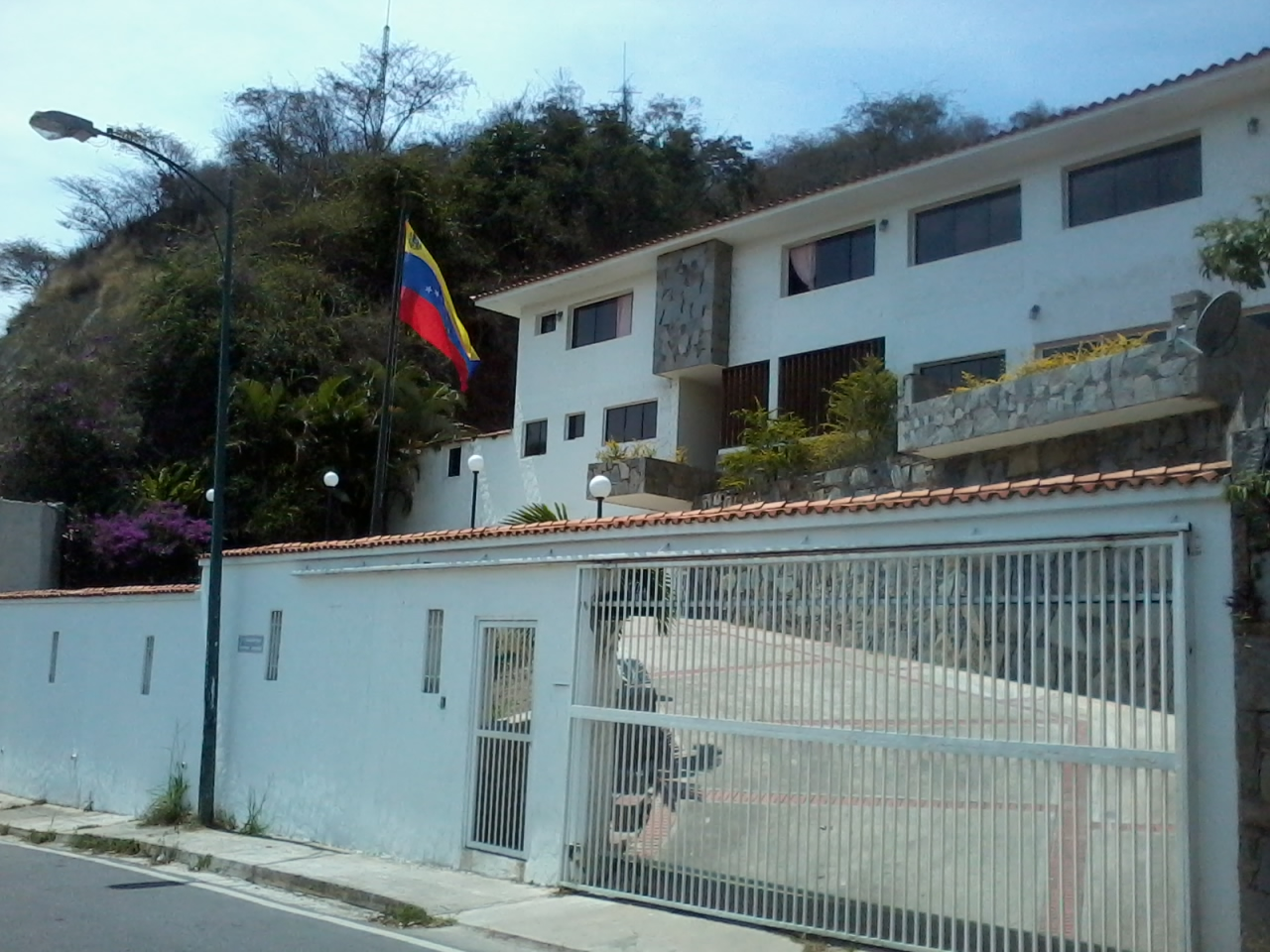
Home of former general Ángel Vivas

On 23 February, about 30 military units arrived at the residence of retired brigadier general Ángel Vivas to arrest him. According to CBC, Vivas "rose to prominence in 2007 when he resigned as head of the Defence Ministry's engineering department rather than order his subalterns to swear to the Cuban-inspired oath 'Socialist Fatherland or death'." Vivas reported that "Cubans and thugs" were attacking his house and moments later appeared atop the roof of his house wearing a flak jacket along with an assault rifle saying "Come find me Maduro!". National Guardsmen made a barricade in front of Vivas' house but neighbors and supporters defended Vivas by placing a barricade of vehicles in front of the troops. The troops retreated without arresting Vivas after the citizens refused to leave the area. Vivas later explained why he thought Venezuelans needed to defend the country from foreigners, saying "Cubans are in all structures of the Venezuelan state" and also explained that he told protesters to set up barricades in order to defend themselves against attacks from the National Guard.

On 29 February, Sukhoi fighter jets of the Venezuelan Air Force were seen flying over San Cristóbal, Táchira, Venezuela on 20 February and President Nicolás Maduro ordered paratroopers of the 41st Airborne Brigade, 4th Armored Division, Venezuelan Army on standby on recommendations from the Minister of Interior and Justice, Lieutenant General Miguel Rodríguez Torres.

== Protest violence ==
=== Colectivos ===
In March 2014, paramilitary groups acted violently in 437 protests, about 31% of total protests in March, where gunshot wounds were reported in most protests they were involved in. According to a correspondent from Televen, armed groups attempted to kidnap and rape individuals in an apartment complex in Maracaibo on 27 March without intervention from the National Guard.

On 16 April, colectivos in several trucks allegedly attacked an apartment complex known for protesting damaging five vehicles, leaving two burnt, and fired several shots into the apartments leaving one person injured from a gunshot wound.

In early May, armed colectivos allegedly attacked and burnt down Universidad Fermín Toro after intimidating student protesters and shooting one.

=== Government forces ===
==== Use of firearms ====
El Nacional said that the objective of those attacking opposition protesters is to kill since many of the protesters that were killed were shot in vulnerable areas like the head and that, "9 of the 15 dead people were from the 12F demonstrators, who were injured by state security forces or paramilitaries linked to the ruling party." El Universal has claimed that Melvin Collazos of SEBIN, and Jonathan Rodríquez, a bodyguard of the Minister of the Interior and Justice Miguel Rodríguez Torres, are in custody after shooting unarmed, fleeing, protesters several times in violation of protocol.

==== Use of chemical agents ====
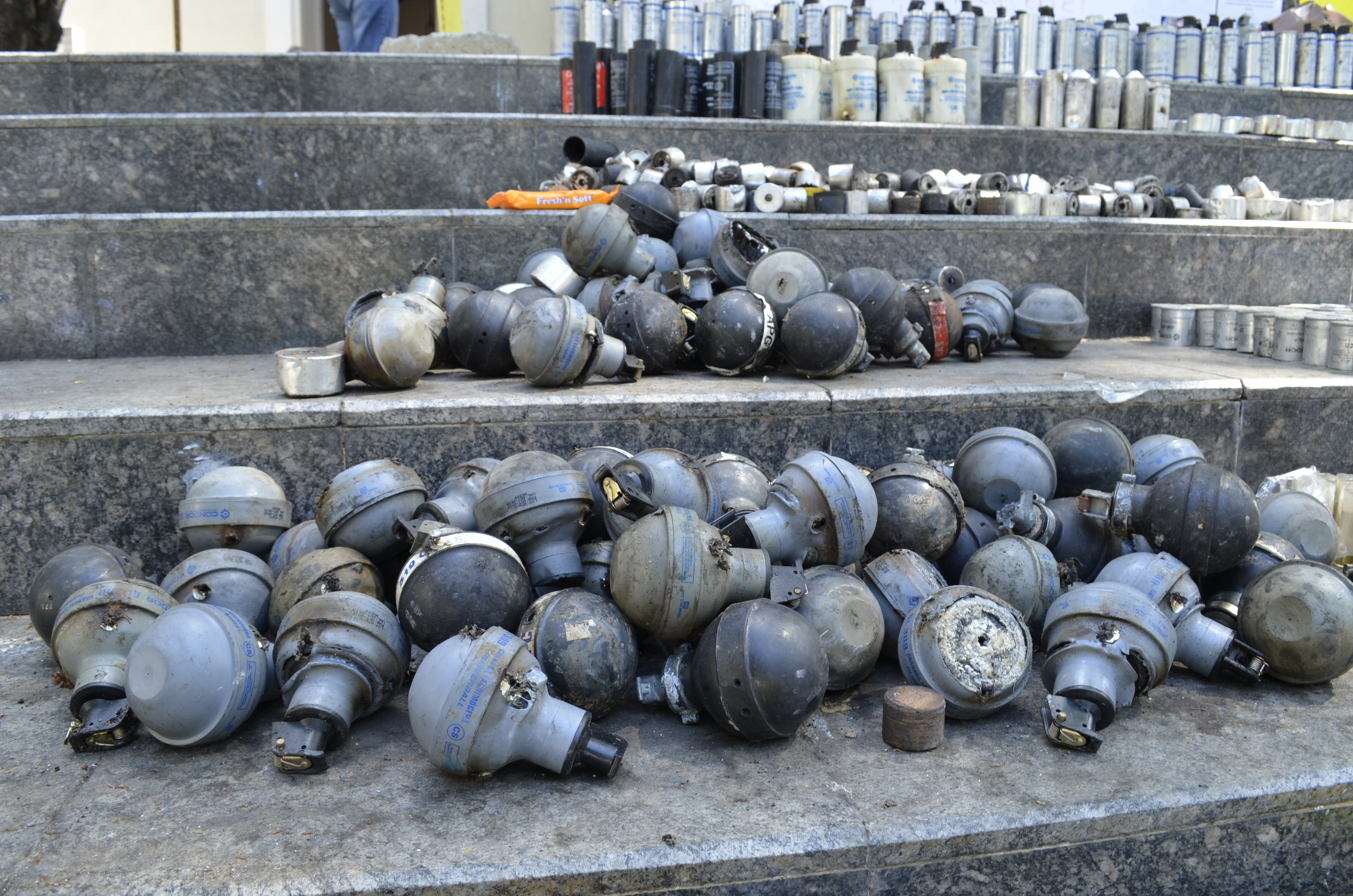
Multiple tear gas canisters on display following a 2014 protest

Some demonstrations have been controlled with tear gas and water cannons.

Some mysterious chemical agents were used in Venezuela as well. On 20 March 2014, the appearance of "red gas" first occurred when it was used in San Cristóbal against protesters, with reports that it was CN gas. The first reported use of "green gas" was on 15 February 2014 against demonstrations in Altamira. On 25 April 2014, "green gas" was reportedly used again on protesters in Mérida. Venezuelan-American Ricardo Hausmann, director of the Center for International Development at Harvard, declared that this gas caused protesters to vomit. Others reported that the chemical used was adamsite, a yellow-green arsenical chemical weapon that can cause respiratory distress, nausea and vomiting.

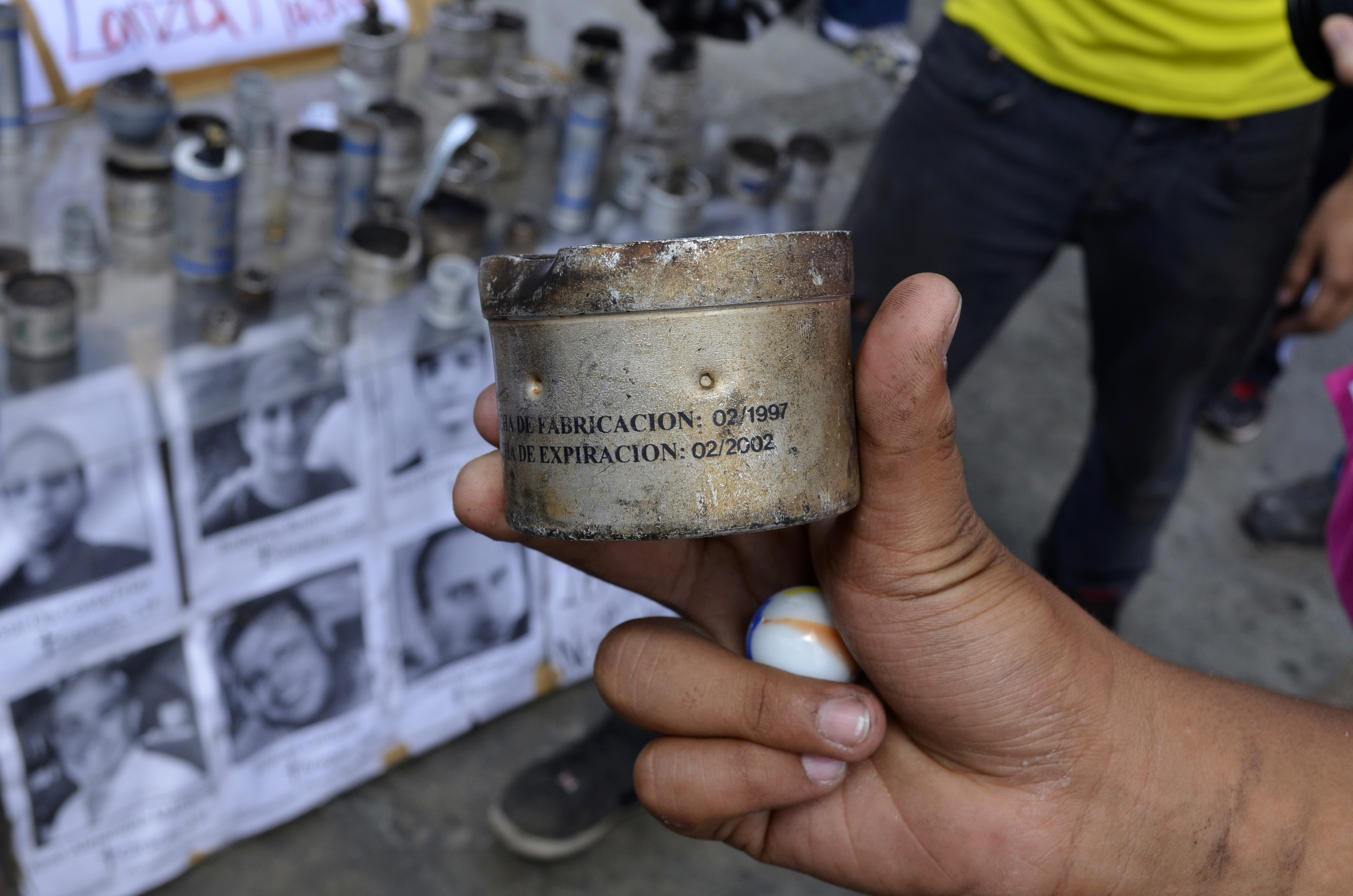
Image of a tear gas canister that expired in 2002, used during the protests

In April 2014, Amnesty International worried about "the use of chemical toxins in high concentrations” by government forces and recommended better training for them. During the months of protest in 2014, the heavy use of tear gas by authorities in Chacao affected surrounding residents and forced them to wear gas masks to "survive" in their homes. Regional human rights groups also denounced the usage of "green gas", stating that its usage is "internationally banned".

A study by Mónica Kräuter, a chemist and professor, involved the collection of thousands of tear gas canisters fired by Venezuelan authorities in 2014. She stated that the majority of canisters used the main component CS gas, supplied by Cóndor of Brazil, which meets Geneva Convention requirements. However, 72% of the tear gas used was expired and other canisters produced in Venezuela by Cavim did not show adequate labels or expiration dates. Following the expiration of tear gas, Krauter notes that it "breaks down into cyanide oxide, phosgenes and nitrogens that are extremely dangerous".

==== Arbitrary detentions ====
Multiple NGOs reported mass arbitrary detentions of demonstrators, political activists and key figures that were targeted. During the period between 12 February and 31 May 2014, the human rights NGO Foro Penal verified 3,127 arbitrary detentions. Many of the detentions were carried out by SEBIN agents, who targeted political activists that later became Deputies before the National Assembly, like Rosmit Mantilla and Renzo Prieto, retired members of the Armed Forces, like Lt. Col. José Gustavo Arocha, and human rights activists, like Rodrigo Diamanti, detained after a raid to the premises of the NGO that he directed, Un Mundo Sin Mordaza, to whom is attributed the creation of the campaign SOS Venezuela According to Alfredo Romero, the director of Foro Penal, the detainees often suffered cruel and unusual treatment, often rising to torture.

== Media ==
=== Domestic media ===
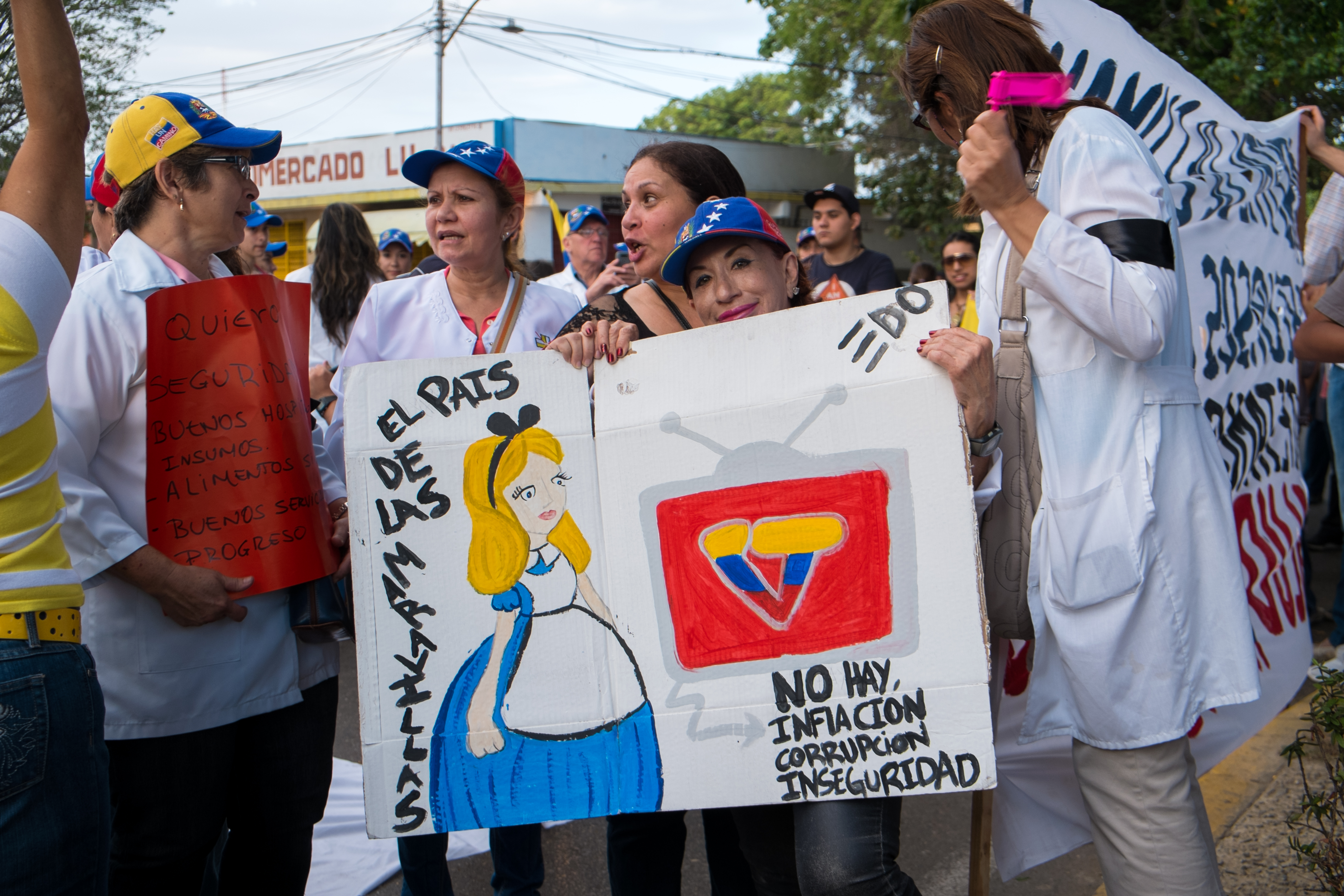
Protester holding a sign criticizing what the Venezuelan state media tells its citizens

Shortly after protests began, the Inter American Press Association protested against the "official censorship" of media by the government in Venezuela which included blocking the internet, banning channels, revoking foreign media credentials, harassing reporters and limiting resources for newspapers.

A group of Venezuelan artists created a group called "Eco" in late-February 2014 to speak out against violations and crimes that have happened in Venezuela during the protests. VTV made a satirical parody of the videos made by the Eco group.

In March 2014 as a response to newspaper shortages and closing of 13 Venezuelan newspapers, the Colombian newspaper organization Andiarios sent a caravan of trucks carrying 52 tons of resources to El Nacional, El Impulso and El Nuevo País as part of the "We are all Venezuela. No press freedom, no democracy" movement to help defend "press freedom and the right to information". Newspaper organizations in Puerto Rico, Panama and Trinidad and Tobago have also shipped newspaper to Venezuela to help ease newspaper shortages caused by price restrictions set by the Venezuelan government.

==== Resignations ====
There were 34 resignations and 17 dismissals of journalists during the protests. The head of investigative journalists at Últimas Noticias resigned after being told not to do a story on guarimbas and after the manager tried to force her to say that the guarimbas were funded, that they were not protesters and to conclude the story by condemning them. While on air, Reimy Chávez, a news anchor for Globovision also resigned and was directed out of the studio by security guards. A cameraman who resigned from Globovisión shared images that were censored by the news agency showing National Guard troops and colectivos working together during the protests. A journalist for Globovision, Carlos Arturo Albino, resigned saying it was because "I do not want to be complicit silence. I'm not trained to be silent."

=== Foreign media ===
Equipment belonging to CNN was "stolen at gunpoint" on 19 February and possibly destroyed by government forces.

President Maduro threatened to force CNN out of Venezuela the next day, saying, "I've asked the (information) minister to tell CNN we have started the administrative process to remove them from Venezuela if they don't rectify (their behavior). Enough! I won't accept war propaganda against Venezuela." On 21 February 2014, the government revoked press credentials of seven CNN journalists with CNN responding to the government by saying, "CNN has reported both sides of the tense situation in Venezuela, even with very limited access to government officials ... We hope the government will reconsider its decision. Meanwhile, we will continue reporting on Venezuela in the fair, accurate and balanced manner we are known for."

=== Attacks on reporters ===
On February 15, 2014, freelance photojournalist Gabriel Osorio was shot with a pellet gun by members of the National Guard. Furthermore, he was kicked repeatedly on the face, stomach, and genitals. On 22 April 2014, reporters from La Patilla that were covering events in Santa Fe were retained by the National Guard. The team of reporters were accused of being "fake journalists", had to show their ID's to the National Guardsmen and had their pictures taken. They were later released without further complications. In another incident, a photojournalist from La Patilla was assaulted by National Police who tried to take his camera and hit him in the head with the butt of a shotgun while he covering protests in Las Mercedes. A week after being attacked in Las Mercedes, the same photojournalist for La Patilla was assaulted by the National Police again who tried to take his camera while covering protests in the Las Minitas neighborhood in Baruta. While covering protests on 14 May, a group of reporters said they were assaulted by the National Guard saying they were fired at and that the National Guard attempted to arrest a reporter. On 27 May 2014, a reporter for La Patilla was attacked for the third time while covering clashes when he was shot by the National Guard. Two reporters were injured on 5 June after being shot with buckshot coming from a National Guard vehicle and reported it to Lieutenant Colonel Rafael Quero Silva of the National Guard, who denied their accounts. On 3 July 2014, during a protest near the Catholic University of Táchira, an NTN24 reporter said he was arrested, beaten and had his passport and ID taken by National Police officers.

=== Censorship ===
Images on Twitter were reported to be unavailable for at least some users in Venezuela for 3 days (12–15 February 2014) after allegedly being blocked by the government. Twitter spokesman Nu Wexler stated that, "I can confirm that the images are now blocked Twitter in Venezuela" adding that "[w]e believe it the government that is blocking".

According to the Huffington Post, the alleged internet blockage by the government was directed at the opposition since it prevented live coverage of government crackdowns with Zello announcing that CANTV blocked the use of its walkie-talkie app that was used by opposition protesters. In an interview with La Patilla, Chief Technology Officer of Zello, Alexey Gavrilov, said that after they opened four new servers for Venezuela, it still appeared that the same direct blocking from CANTV is the cause of the Zello outage. The Venezuelan government said Zello was blocked due to "terrorist acts" and statements by TeleSUR about radical opposition after the government monitored staged messages from "internet trolls" that used a Honeypot trap against authorities.

== In popular media ==
- The 2023 film Simón, directed by Venezuelan filmmaker Diego Vicentini, follows a Venezuelan protester that is detained during the demonstrations and tortured along with his companions.

== See also ==
- La Salida
- Reactions to the 2014 Venezuelan protests
- Protests against Nicolás Maduro
- 2017 Venezuelan protests
- 2019 Venezuelan protests
- List of protests in the 21st century
