= Génesis Carmona =

Venezuelan model (1991–2014)

- Génesis Carmona, Miss Turismo 2013 Carabobo, Venezuela
- Born: 20 September 1991; Carabobo, Venezuela
- Died: 19 February 2014 (aged 22); Valencia, Venezuela
- Occupations: Model, student

Génesis Cristina Carmona Tovar (20 September 1991 – 19 February 2014) was a Venezuelan fashion model, beauty queen, and college student who was killed while protesting against the government of Venezuela during the 2014 Venezuelan protests. She later became a symbol of protest against the Nicolás Maduro government during the time of demonstrations in the country.

== Career ==
Born and educated in Carabobo, Carmona majored in Social Studies at Universidad Tecnológica del Centro, a local polytechnic located in Valencia's eastern satellite Alianza City, in the metropolitan capital region of the state of Carabobo in Venezuela.

She had initially participated in fashion events held in the city of Valencia, such as Venezuela Moda and Fashion Week Valencia. In 2010, she was a pre-candidate for Miss Venezuela 2010, though she did not qualify to participate in the pageant. In 2013, as a 21-year-old, she entered a regional beauty contest for her native state of Carabobo, winning one of the titles and being crowned 2013 Miss Turismo Carabobo.

== Death ==
=== Protest ===
External videos
- A video linking the images below to footage of the protest, showing Carmona being transported seconds after pro-government individuals fired rounds on YouTube

Pro-government colectivos fire upon the protest Carmona was participating in

On 18 February 2014, Carmona participated in an anti-government demonstration. Protesters, dressed in white, planned to march down Cedeño Avenue to the Plaza de Toros. The march encountered military barricades and prevented the hundreds of demonstrators from advancing, with participants deciding to protest in the space in which they were confined. At 3:30pm, pro-government colectivos arrived on the scene and began to attack the protest with "[b]ottles, stones and gunfire". As shots rang out, individuals scattered into Cedeño Mall, seeking shelter from bullets.

The attack resulted in several opposition protesters injured, 8 of those injured from gunshot wounds, including Carmona, who suffered a gunshot wound to the back of the head. Witnesses described that she sunk to the ground after a bullet penetrated her left occipital skull area.

Carmona was then placed in the ICU. A day later on 19 February at 12:15 p.m, she died from "significant" brain damage due to gunshot trauma and loss of blood the following day. Physician Carlos Rosales explained that the bullet was still in Carmona's brain and that if she had survived, she would have been blind.

=== Aftermath ===
==== Media and family response ====
In an interview with Spanish newspaper ABC, Carmona's friend and fellow protester Héctor Rotunda said Carmona was shot when a group of about 50 individuals outfitted in red (and thus believed to be government supporters) approached the demonstration and fired a burst of about 10 rounds at protesters. Mourners at Carmona's funeral stated she was "killed by government mercenaries." Some foreign news sources said that pro-government paramilitaries were the ones who shot and killed her. Carmona's mother has also stated that the attackers were clearly identifiable in videos as Venezuelan government supporters and that Venezuelan authorities did "nothing" to clarify Carmona's death.

Some have blamed Francisco Ameliach for Carmona's death. Days before Carmona was killed, the governor of the state of Carabobo, Francisco Ameliach, called on Unidades de Batalla Bolívar-Chávez (Units of Battle Hugo Chávez, UBCh), in a tweet, asking UBCh to launch a rapid counterattack against protesters saying that the order would come from the President of the National Assembly, Diosdado Cabello. After Carmona's death, Venezuela's anti-government protesters placed posters in various areas of Valencia, condemning Ameliach's tweet and linked it to the killing of Carmona.

==== Venezuelan government's response ====
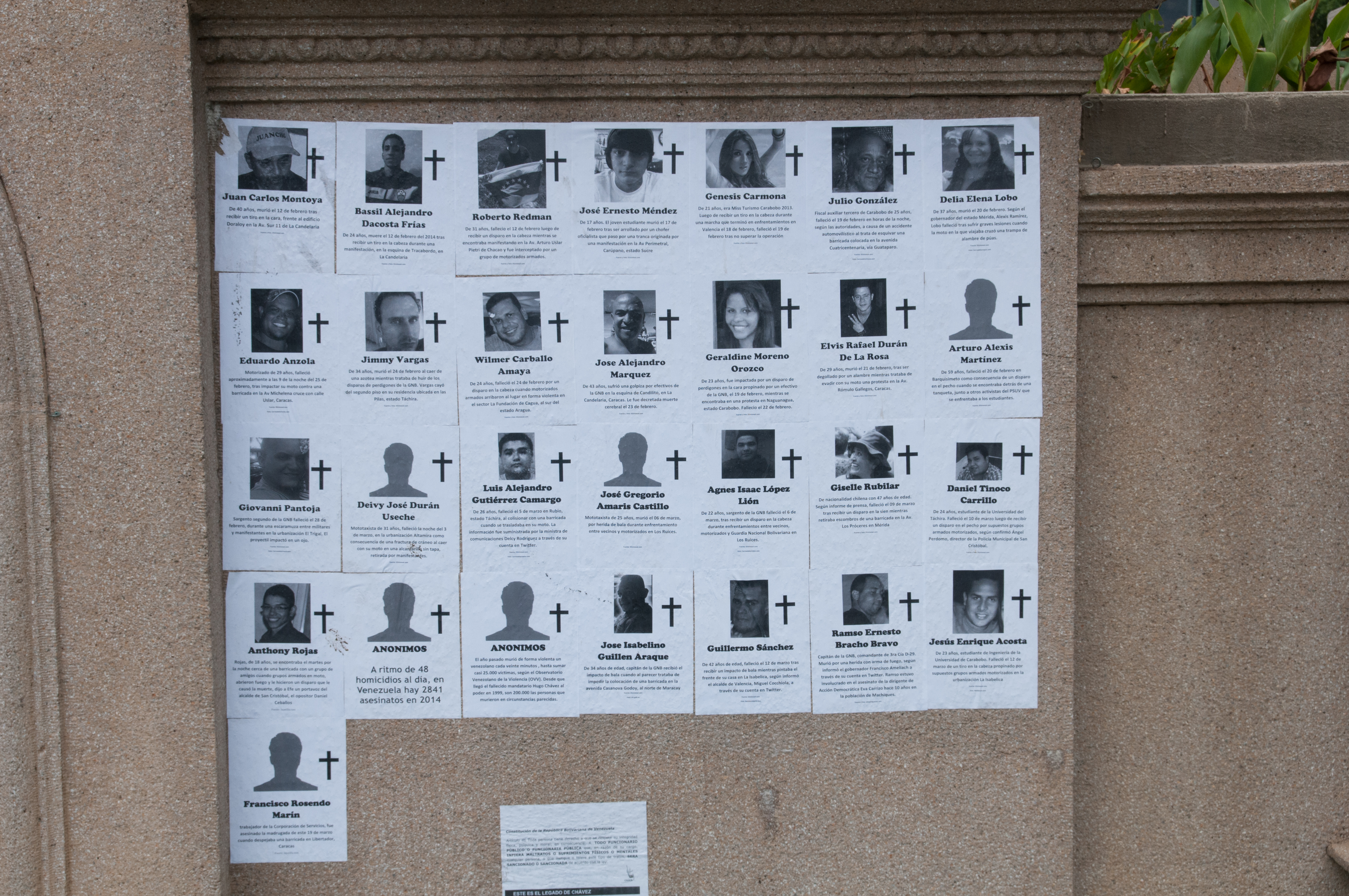
A memorial for a few of those killed during the 2014 Venezuelan protests, with Carmona among those pictured (top row, third from right)

The President of Venezuela, Nicolás Maduro, expressed his condolences to Carmona's family and to the people who loved her. Minister of the Interior, Miguel Rodríguez Torres, reported that the bullet that killed her came from her own ranks during the anti-government march.

Only one PSUV member, Juan Maza, was placed on parole, having to report every 15 days. However, as of 18 February 2017, three years after Carmona's death, the Venezuelan has never resolved the case surrounding her death.

=== Family's asylum ===
In December 2014, Carmona's mother, María Eugenia Tovar, as well as her sister, Alejandra Carmona, moved to the United States seeking asylum. As of February 2017, the family has remained private, residing in the United States.

== Legacy ==
Naguanagua Mayor Alejandro Feo La Cruz paid tribute to those who had died during protests in Carabobo, naming an avenue "Génesis Carmona Avenue" and named a park after another protester, Geraldin Moreno.

The Universidad Tecnológica del Centro, where Carmona studied, declared three days of mourning and named the meeting room of the board of trustees and Superior of the university Génesis Carmona in her honor.

== See also ==
- Bassil Da Costa
