= PROVEA =

Venezuelan human rights non-governmental organization

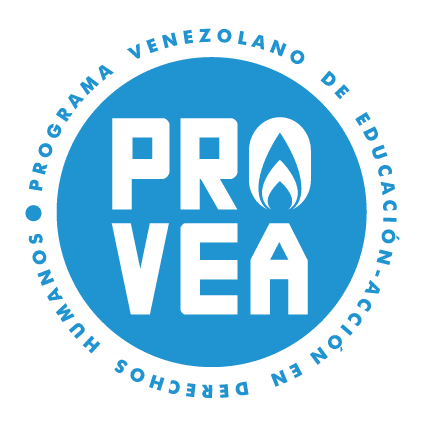
- Formation: October 15, 1988; 38 years ago
- Type: Non-profit NGO
- Purpose: Human rights activism
- Location: Venezuela
- Website: provea.org

The Venezuelan Education-Action Program on Human Rights or PROVEA (Spanish: Programa Venezolano de Educación-Acción en Derechos Humanos) is one of the most prominent Venezuelan human rights organizations. According to the United Nations Human Rights Council, PROVEA "is an independent and autonomous non-governmental organization, which aims to promote and defend human rights, particularly economic, social and cultural rights".

== History ==
PROVEA was founded on 15 October 1988 by Ligia Bolivar, a former Amnesty International employee, Dianorah Contramaestre, a Christian community worker and Raúl Cubas, a former detainee of the Argentine dictatorship. Its mission was to be an independent watchdog of the Venezuelan people's economic, social and cultural rights.

In 2024, as the human rights situation in Venezuela deteriorated under the rule of President Nicolas Maduro, government officials declared PROVEA to be an "enemy of the people." PROVEA has offered support to imprisoned human rights activists, including Martha Lía Grajales.

== Reception ==
A 1993 Human Rights Watch publication titled Human Rights in Venezuela, recognized PROVEA for creating "training programs for human rights activists throughout the country."

In 2010 PROVEA received the John Humphrey Freedom Award.

President Hugo Chávez stated that "PROVEA is an institution that I know, with which we share the defense of human rights, they are in favor of our rights and our families". José Miguel Vivanco, the Director of Human Rights Watch in the Americas said that "PROVEA is one of the most prestigious organizations in the region. It is an honor for us to work together with them."

== See also ==
- Foro Penal
- Un Mundo Sin Mordaza
- Venezuelan Observatory of Social Conflict
