= Rodrigo Diamanti =

Venezuelan human rights activist

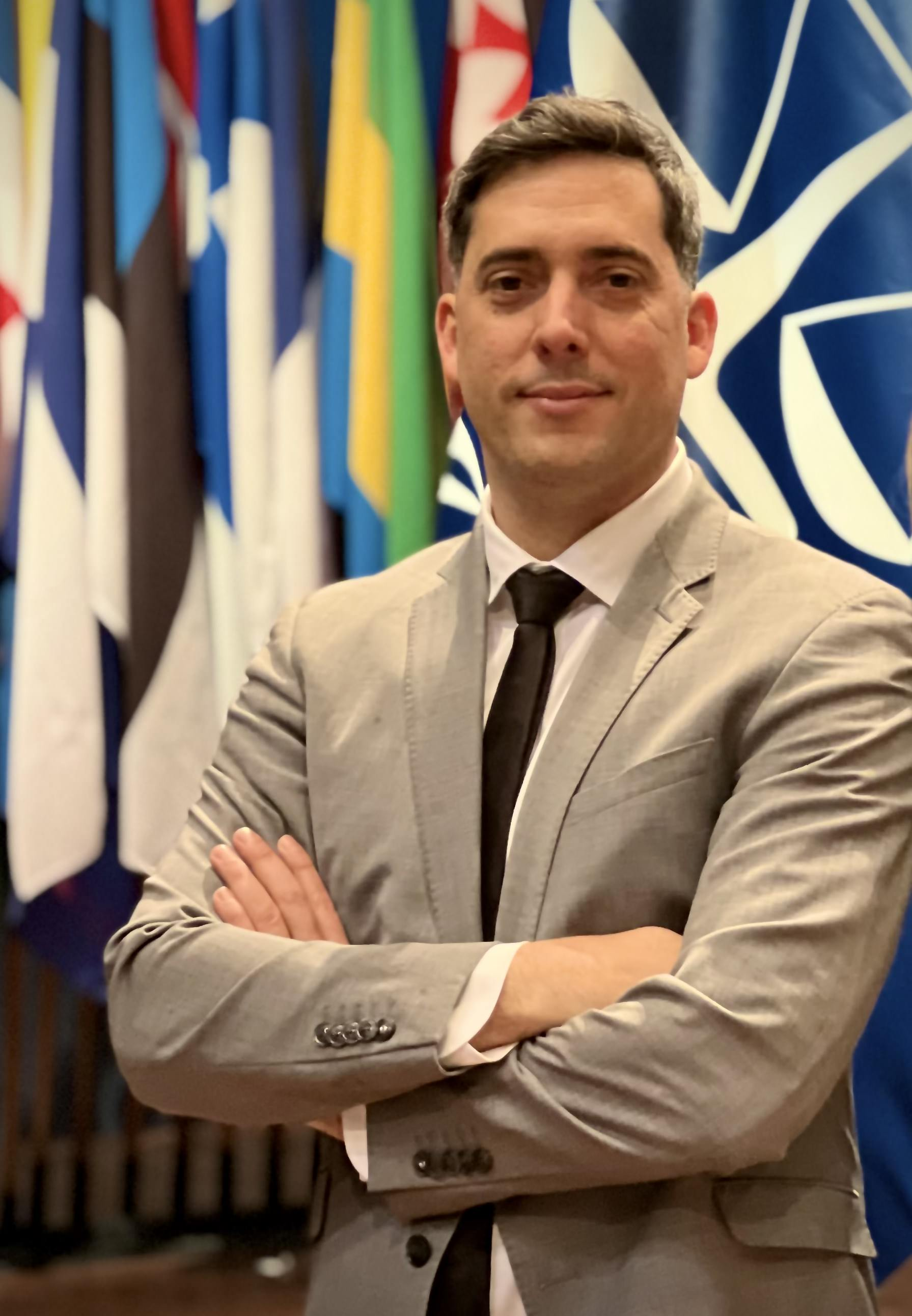
- Diamanti in 2022
- Education: Harvard University; Universidad Ortega y Gasset; Andrés Bello Catholic University
- Occupations: Human rights activist, international speaker
- Known for: Un Mundo Sin Mordaza

Rodrigo Diamanti is a Venezuelan human rights activist, who is the founder and president of Un Mundo Sin Mordaza, a human rights NGO. His work includes advocacy for freedom of expression, fundamental rights, and democratic values in Venezuela and other authoritarian regimes.

== Career ==
In 2006, Diamanti obtained a bachelor's degree in economics from the Andrés Bello Catholic University in Caracas. His activism career began in 2007 when he co-founded the Venezuela Students Movement, which was established for transparent governance, freedom of expression and reconciliation in Venezuela.

In 2008, he founded Futuro Presente, a non-profit organization focusing on mobilizing and educating young people on democratic values and rule of law in Venezuela; it received funding from the Cato Institute. Futuro Presente ran a program called LIDERA in association with Venezuela's leading business school IESA. Diamanti obtained a master's degree in political studies from Universidad Ortega y Gasset in Madrid in 2008.

In May 2009, Diamanti founded Un Mundo Sin Mordaza, a non-governmental organization which promotes human rights and freedom of expression using artivism. He was detained during the 2014 Venezuelan protests, as he was targeted by SEBIN agents as the creator of the global campaign SOS Venezuela. Un Mundo Sin Mordaza has created several campaigns and mobilized volunteers in more than 100 cities in the world.

Upon release from detention, Diamanti fled from Venezuela. In 2015, he joined the Harvard Kennedy School where he received an MPA degree, and later became a fellow at the Ash Center for Democratic Governance and Innovation as well as the Carr Center for Human Rights Policy at Harvard Kennedy School.

Since 2018, Diamanti has led the Crimes Against Humanity Observatory, a non-profit documenting human rights violations in Venezuela for the International Criminal Court. It was started as a joint project between Un Mundo Sin Mordaza and Defiende Venezuela.

In 2019, Diamanti worked as a special representative of the interim government of Venezuela to the Republic of Italy. Diamanti was part of President Juan Guaido's delegation and oversaw diplomatic engagements with the Italian ministry as the official representative for Guaido.

In 2020, Diamanti became the secretary of the Panel of Independent International Experts for Organization of American States, presenting reports on crimes against humanity in Venezuela and meeting with international bodies, NGOs and embassies.

In 2020, Diamanti and Un Mundo Sin Mordaza created a campaign for the reinstatement of DirecTV signal in Venezuela, denouncing the attacks on freedom of expression in the country.

In 2021, he was nominated for Campaign of the Year at Napolitan Victory Awards for the Alza La Voz campaign. In 2022, he received the Thomson Reuters Foundation TrustLaw Collaboration Award for his report on Venezuelans seeking refuge in other countries.

As of 2023, Diamanti is the founder and chairman of the board at Freedom Academy, which trains activists in non-violent methods for challenging authoritarian regimes.

== Recognition ==
In 2012, Diamanti was recognized by the World Economic Forum as a Global Shaper. In 2013, he received the Medal of Rome from the Mayor of Rome. He was previously a senior fellow of Alliance of Youth Movements. In 2019, he was named one of the Freedom Fellows by Human Rights Foundation.
