= Martha Lía Grajales =

Colombian-Venezuelan human rights activist

- Born: Colombia
- Citizenship: Venezuela
- Occupation: Human rights activist
- Spouse: Antonio González Plessmann

Martha Lía Grajales is a Colombian-born Venezuelan human rights activist.

== Early life ==
Grajales was born in Colombia, on 16 March of 1980 and later became a naturalised citizen of Venezuela after moving to Caracas.

== Human rights activist ==
In Caracas, Grajales joined SurGentes, a collective that supported marginalised communities in Venezuela, in addition to documenting cases of alleged arbitrary detention and torture. She married Antonio González Plessmann, a fellow SurGentes member.

=== August 2025 arrest ===
Grajales publicly advocated for the release of political prisoners who had been detained following the contested 2024 Venezuelan presidential election, and joined the Committee of Mothers in Defence of the Truth (Comité de Madres en Defensa de la Verdad). On 5 August 2025, she participated in their vigil held in front of the Supreme Court of Justice in Caracas demanding a review of the investigations into political prisoners, as well as calling for their release. During the vigil, the group was attacked, including having phones and identity documents stolen, as well as their tents destroyed. Grajales attempted to file criminal complaints about the attack with the Public Prosecutor's Office and the Scientific, Penal and Criminal Investigation Corps, but both organisations refused to accept it.

On 8 August 2025, Grajales was arrested by officers from the Criminal Investigations Division of the Bolivarian National Police after she left a demonstration by the Committee of Mothers in Defence of the Truth that had been held outside the United Nations' headquarters in Caracas to protest the attack on the group three days earlier. A relative of Grajales reported that she had been detained at a police checkpoint in Altamira, where she was asked for identification, which she had been unable to provide due to it having been previously confiscated at the vigil on 5 August. Grajales was subsequently reported to have been forced into an unmarked grey van which then drove away from the area.

Grajales' whereabouts were initially unknown after her arrest, and several non-governmental organisations denounced her arrest, including PROVEA, which concluded that Grajales had been arbitrarily detained. Justicia, Encuentro y Perdón demanded that Venezuelan authorities urgently provide confirmation and verification of Grajales' location, as well as assurances that her physical and mental health, as well as her fundamental rights, were being met. On 11 August, around 100 people took part in a demonstration at the Kaikaishi Community Centre in La Vega expressing public support for Grajales and calling for her release. The Communist Party of Venezuela released a statement condemning Grajales' arrest.

Internationally, Amnesty International called on the Venezuelan government to respect the "integrity, life and freedom" of Grajales and asked for transparency concerning the circumstances of her detention. The Workers' Left Front, an alliance of socialist political parties in Argentina, stated "this week in Venezuela, the repression against [the] opposition left has advanced", adding it "emphatically repudiates these repressive acts".

On 9 August 2025, Marino Alvarado, a PROVEA activist, was denied a habeas corpus petition by the president of the Criminal Court Circuit of the Metropolitan Area of Caracas. PROVEO, as well as Grajales' husband, had previously visited five detention centres around Caracas trying to locate Grajales.

Grajales' location was unknown until 11 August 2025, when the Public Prosecutor's Office released a statement confirming that she had been arrested for "actions against Venezuelan institutions and the peace of the Republic". It was confirmed Grajales was being detained at a detention centre in Maripérez, despite PROVEO and Grajales' husband having previously visited there while searching for her without being informed she was there. Grajales was subsequently moved to a detention facility in Los Teques and was given state-appointed counsel despite requesting her own attorney.

On 13 August 2025, Grajales was released from detention pending a trial.

=== Response to arrest ===
Front Line Defenders condemned the "arbitrary detention" of Grajales and described it as an "attempt to stop her legitimate human rights work in Venezuela", calling for the charges against her to be dropped and for her immediate release.

The Human Rights Research Centre also demanded Grajales' immediate release, describing her detention as being part of Venezuela's "crackdown on dissent [and] disregard for fundamental human rights".

The UN High Commissioner for Human Rights, Volker Türk, called for Grajales' "immediate release" and that her family and lawyer should be told her location.
