= Bassil Da Costa =

Venezuelan student killed during the 2014 protests

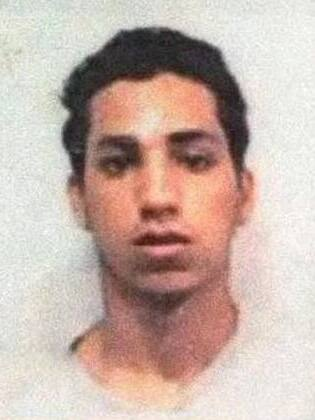
- Da Costa in 2011
- Born: Bassil Alejandro Da Costa Frías^{[a]} May 7, 1990; Guatire, Venezuela
- Died: 12 February 2014 (aged 23); Caracas, Venezuela
- Cause of death: Gunshot
- Occupation: Student
- Known for: First death during the 2014 Venezuelan protests
- Parent(s): Alejandro Da Costa; Jeneth Frías

External videos
- ¿Quién mató a Bassil da Costa?, Chronology of the 12 February 2014 events

Bassil Alejandro Da Costa Frías^{[a]} (Guatire, 7 May 1990 – Caracas, 12 February 2014) was a Venezuelan university student, killed during the 2014 protests against the Venezuelan government, the first death of the wave of protests. Da Costa was a marketing student at the Universidad Alejandro de Humboldt in Caracas.

== Death ==
On 12 February 2014, Youth Day in Venezuela, various parties in opposition to the Venezuelan government and student groups marched in the entire country in protest against the government. In Caracas, the protest march was held from Plaza Venezuela to the Public Ministry's offices in the city's downtown. An hour after the march ended, clashes occurred in the La Candelaria Parish; protesters armed with rocks, bottles, fireworks and slingshots skirmished with authorities who responded with tear gas. During the confrontations, Da Costa was shot and killed.

On 13 February 2014, President Nicolás Maduro said Da Costa and Montoya were killed by the same person and that the murders were part of the "violence generated by the opposition". The secretary of the Democratic Unity Roundtable (MUD), the opposition coalition, Ramón Guillermo Aveledo, rejected President Maduro's statements and maintained the protesters were not ill-intended, while hinting at possible government infiltrates in the march.

=== Investigations ===
The first investigations made by the Cuerpo de Investigaciones Científicas, Penales y Criminalísticas (CICPC) identified at least three members of the Bolivarian Intelligence Service (SEBIN) who had shot against protesters near the Public Ministry offices the day of the march, amongst them the alleged killer of Da Costa.

Days later, Últimas Noticias published the results of an investigative work on the murders, in which it claimed to have discovered both men in uniform and civilians had shot against the protesters on 12 February. In April 2014, six SEBIN officers were apprehended and the alleged murderer of Da Costa was formally indicted.

The trial on Da Costa and Montoya's murders was delayed in various occasions, until it finally started on 16 June 2015, over a year after they took place. One of the SEBIN officers was sentenced to prison in 2016.

== See also ==
- Génesis Carmona
- Timeline of the 2014 Venezuelan protests

== Notes ==
1. Also spelled as "Dacosta Frías".
