= Venezuelan Observatory of Social Conflict =

Organization

- Observatorio Venezolano de Conflictividad Social
- Abbreviation: OVCS
- Formation: 2010
- Type: Non-governmental organization
- Headquarters: Caracas, Venezuela
- Director: Marco Antonio Ponce
- Website: www.observatoriodeconflictos.org.ve

The Venezuelan Observatory of Social Conflict (Spanish: Observatorio Venezolano de Conflictividad Social, OVCS) is a Venezuelan non-governmental organization that was founded in 2010 which focuses on promoting human rights and studying social conflict in Venezuela.

Numerous media outlets have cited the Venezuelan Observatory of Social Conflict, including the Associated Press, Foreign Policy, Reuters and The Wall Street Journal.

== Affiliations ==
The Venezuelan Observatory of Social Conflict is affiliated with various NGOs and institutions such as the Organization of American States, Central University of Venezuela and the Latin American Council of Social Sciences.

== Intimidation ==
The General Coordinator of the OVCS, Marco Antonio Ponce, has been intimidated by the Venezuelan government on multiple occasions. He is often followed by SEBIN personnel, has his image placed on Venezuelan state media with crosshairs on him and has Venezuelan officials denounce him.

Beginning in October 2014, Ponce had been accused of conspiracy by then President of the National Assembly, Diosdado Cabello, on his state television show, Hitting with the Sledge Hammer. In March 2015, Cabello even revealed the date and time of Ponce's arrival back to Venezuela on air and once Ponce arrived, he and other human rights advocates were intimidated by armed individuals who took their photographs and followed them to their vehicles.

== See also ==
- Foro Penal
- Un Mundo Sin Mordaza
- PROVEA
