= Venezuelan military ranks =

Rank structure of the military of Venezuela

In July 2008, Venezuela enacted a law modifying the military rank structure, including changes to rank names, functions, and command regulations of the armed forces. The law was approved by the National Assembly.

The legislation introduced the rank of Comandante en Jefe (Commander-in-chief), elevated the General en Jefe / Almirante en Jefe to a four-star general or flag officer rank, and created the Mayor General / Almirante rank.

The Venezuelan military rank system differs from those of other Latin American countries and NATO. It includes three categories of Non-Commissioned Officers: Technical NCOs and Warrant Officers, Professional NCOs, and Enlisted NCOs.

== History ==
Historically, the Venezuelan system of ranks and insignia was based on Prussian patterns, similar to those used in the armies of Chile and Ecuador. At present, Prussian-style insignia are retained only on the ceremonial full dress uniform (not shown below). For everyday use, a simplified pattern system was introduced. The Prussian pattern in ceremonial uniforms is retained only by the Army and the National Guard, with selected officers in command positions in these services also wearing Prussian-pattern epaulettes.

The Navy's officer rank insignia follow the British sleeve pattern, incorporating the executive curl as a result of strong British influence.

== Commander in chief ==
Commander in chief Comandante en jefe
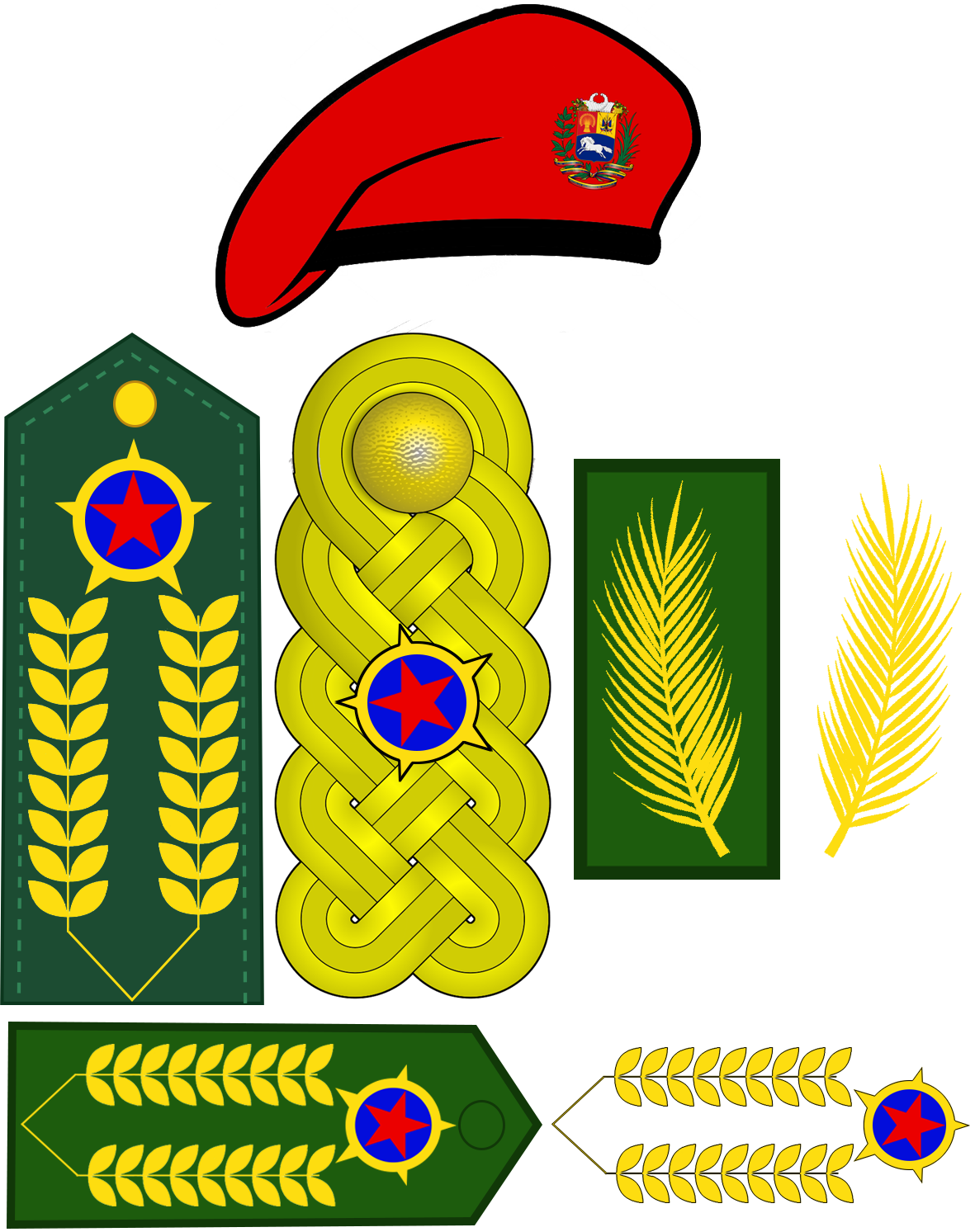
- Country: Venezuela
- Rank: Commander in chief; Honorary
- Formation: 2008
- Next lower rank: General/Admiral en jefe

The office of the Venezuelan military supreme commander has always been held by the President of Venezuela as per constitutional requirements, however with the new law sanctioned in 2008, the “Comandante en Jefe” is not only a function and an appointment attributed to the executive branch, but is now set to be a military rank equivalent to a five-star general or a field marshal. Anybody who gets elected President of Venezuela is automatically made a full general of the National Armed Forces and may be granted full military uniform, but he may wear it or not depending on the circumstances.

Hugo Chávez left the Army as a lieutenant colonel in 1992, but when he became president he adopted the uniform of "Commander in Chief", with distinctive shoulder badge and sleeve and epaulet insignia and carried a saber similar to Simon Bolivar's in military events. During the Nicolas Maduro administration however, the rank insignia and epaulet (as well as the saber) were not worn by him during major military events, instead preferring to wear civilian dress or suits during formal events (with the national flag sash and the presidential medal). He wore a version of the "Commander in Chief" uniform for the first time on February 19, 2020, during a meeting with senior military leaders.

This rank holds the direct operational control and command over all armed forces, and is held while he is in the presidential office.

The position is a copy of the one used by Fidel Castro in Cuba, and the design of the shoulder patch are very similar, but not in the shoulder board and epaulet on the dress uniform since Venezuelan military ranks are inspired by German (especially Prussian) military influence, and thus is similar to a Marshal of the German Democratic Republic but with a dark red star inside.

== Commissioned officer ranks ==
The rank insignia of commissioned officers.

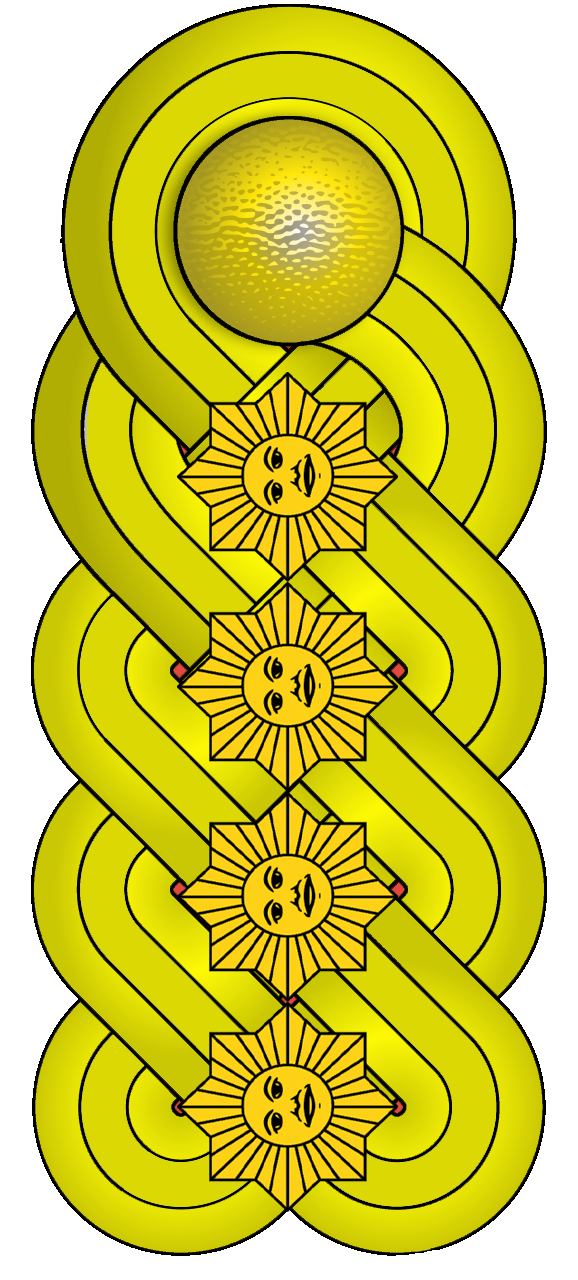
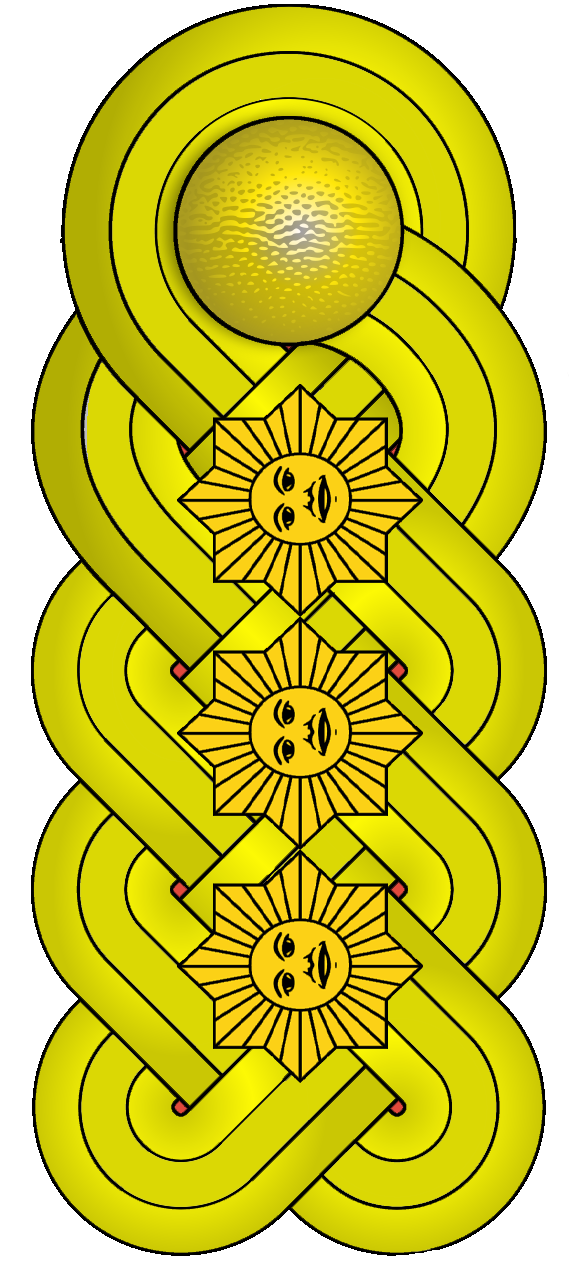
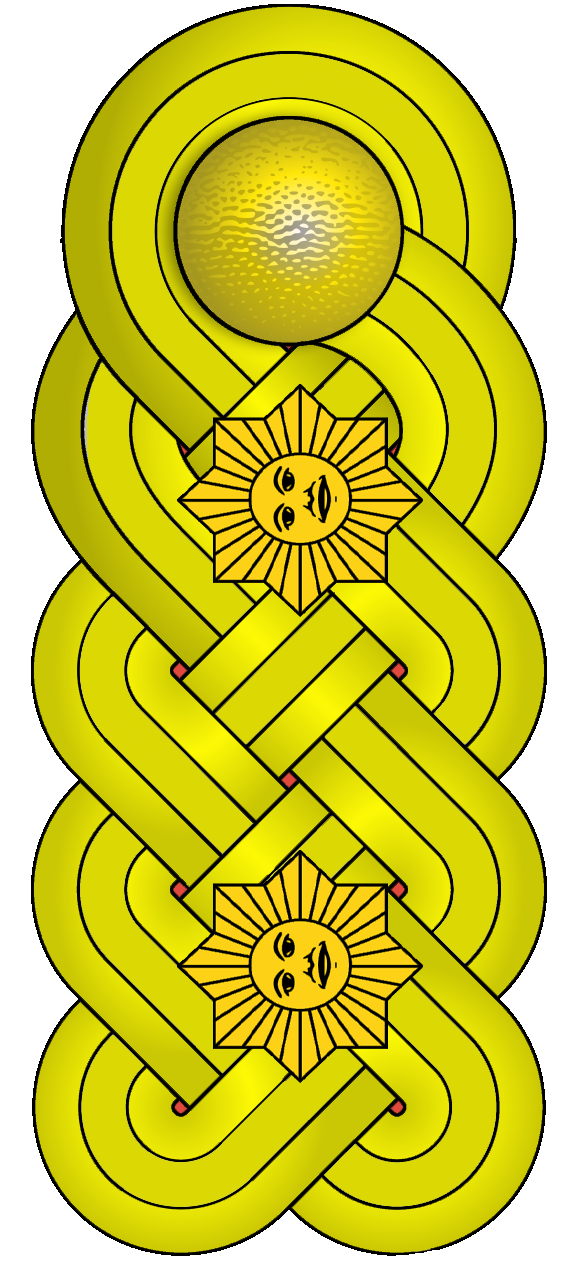
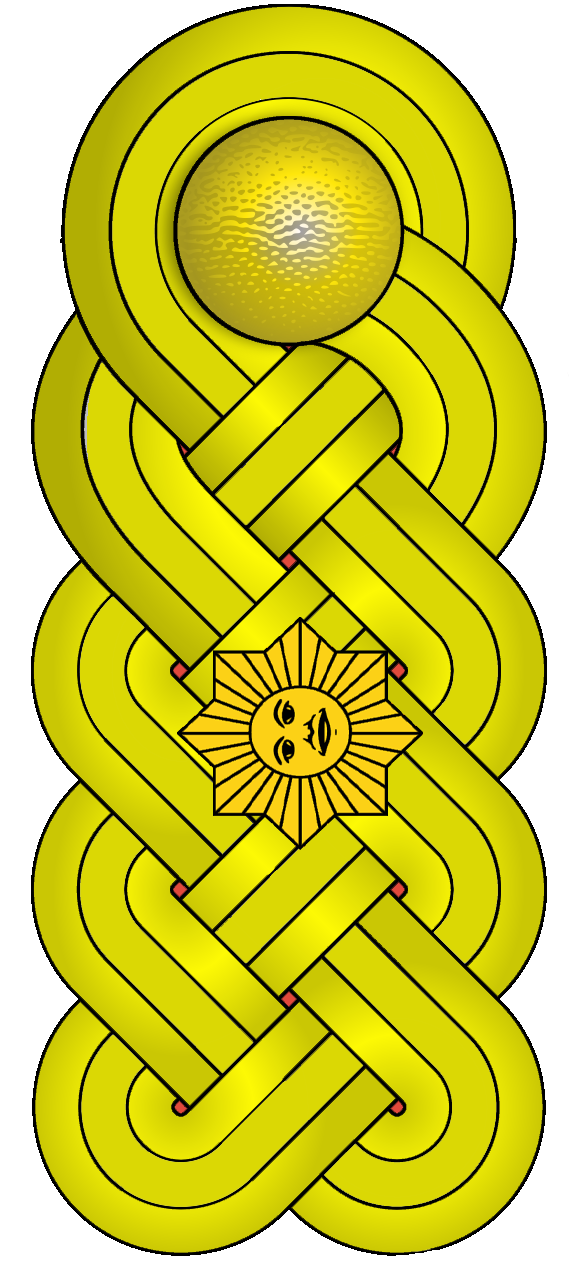
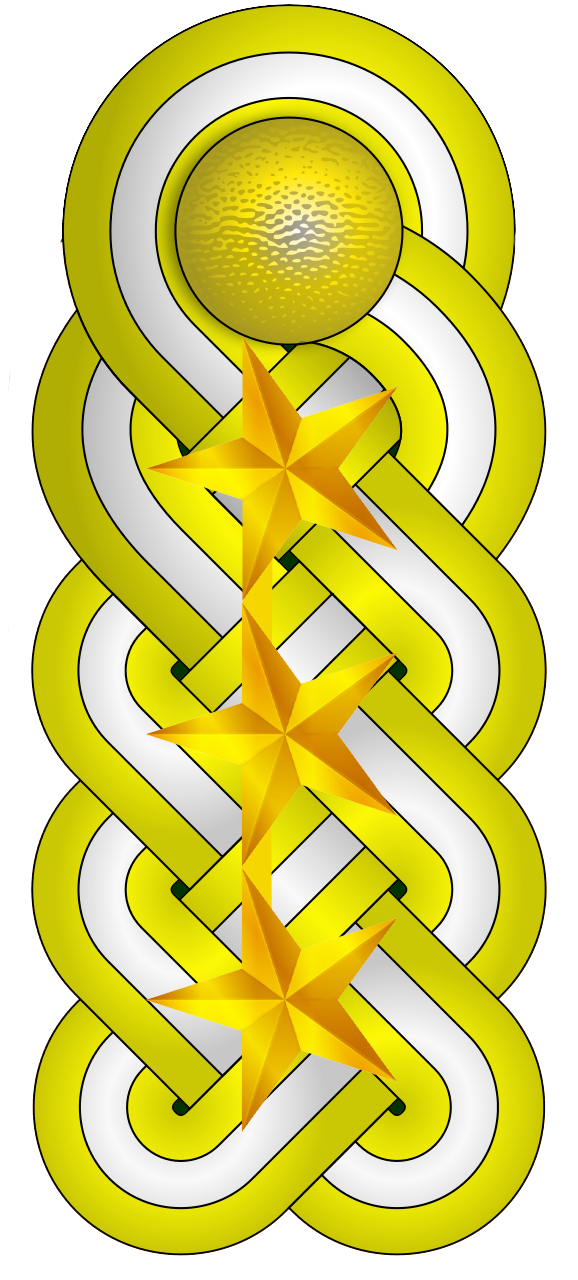
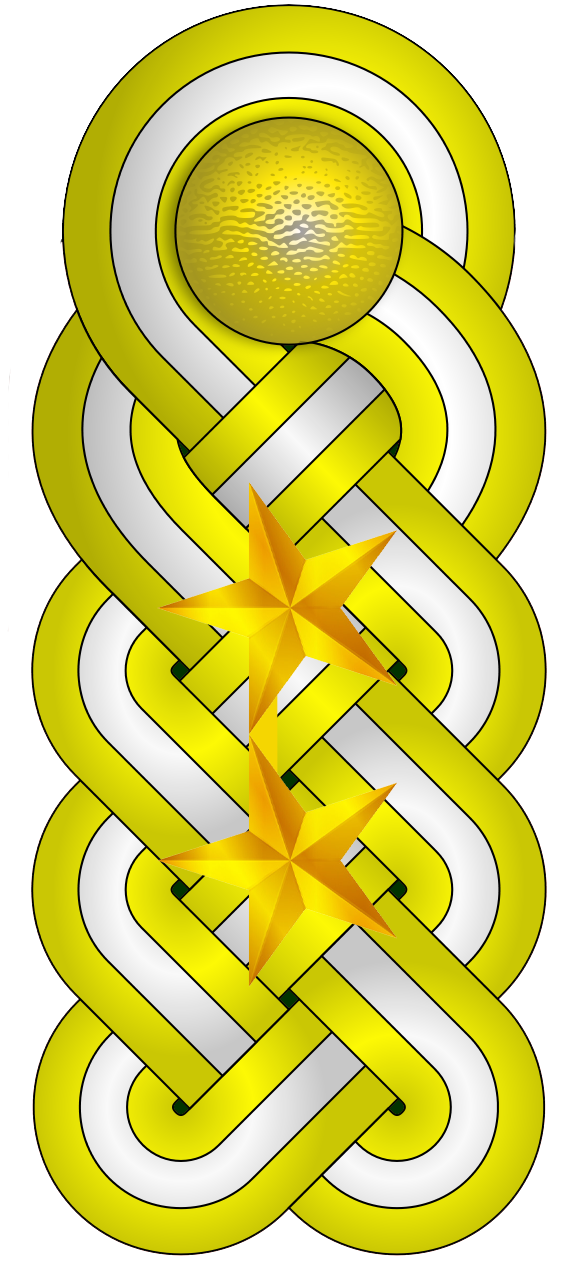
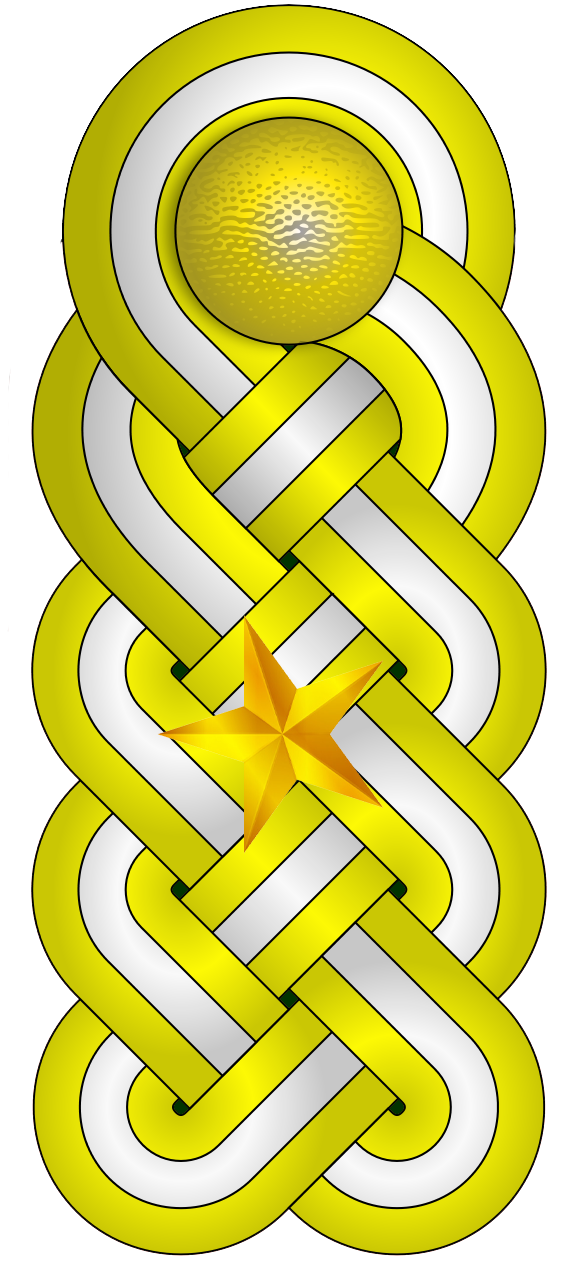
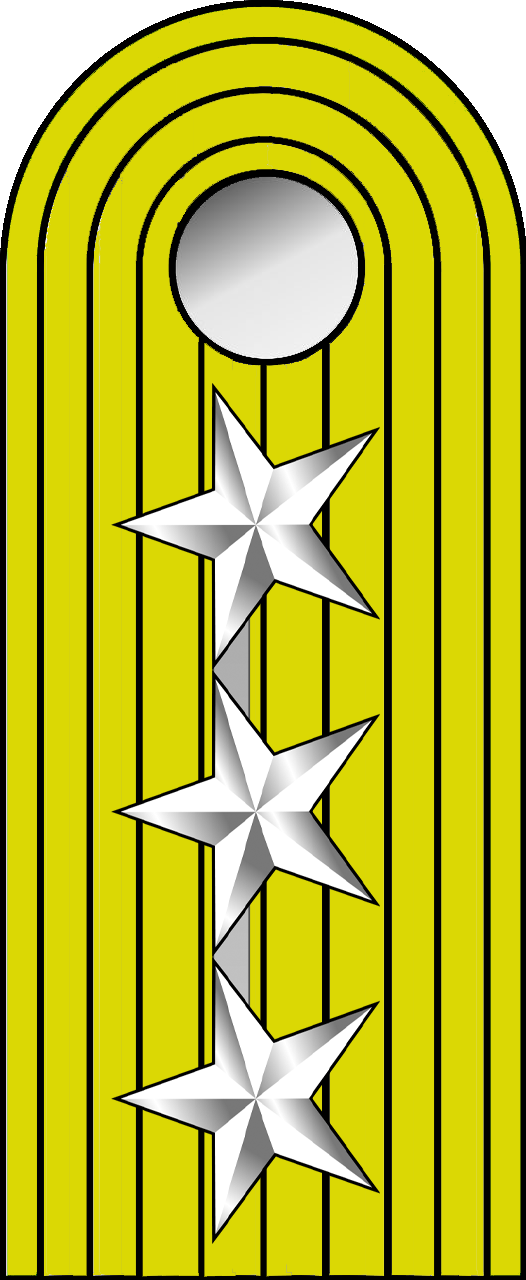
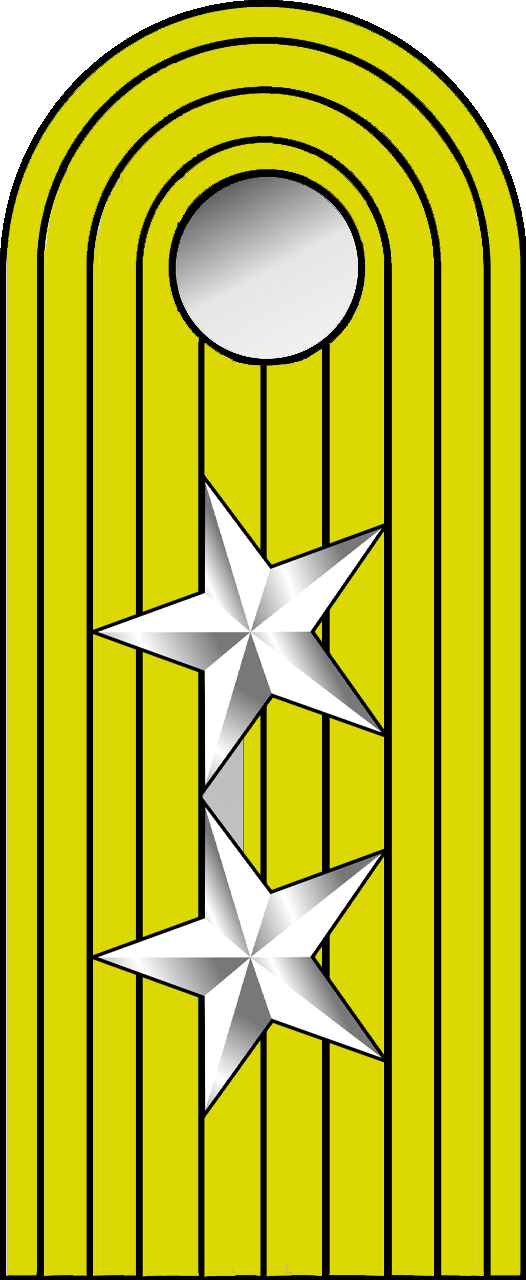
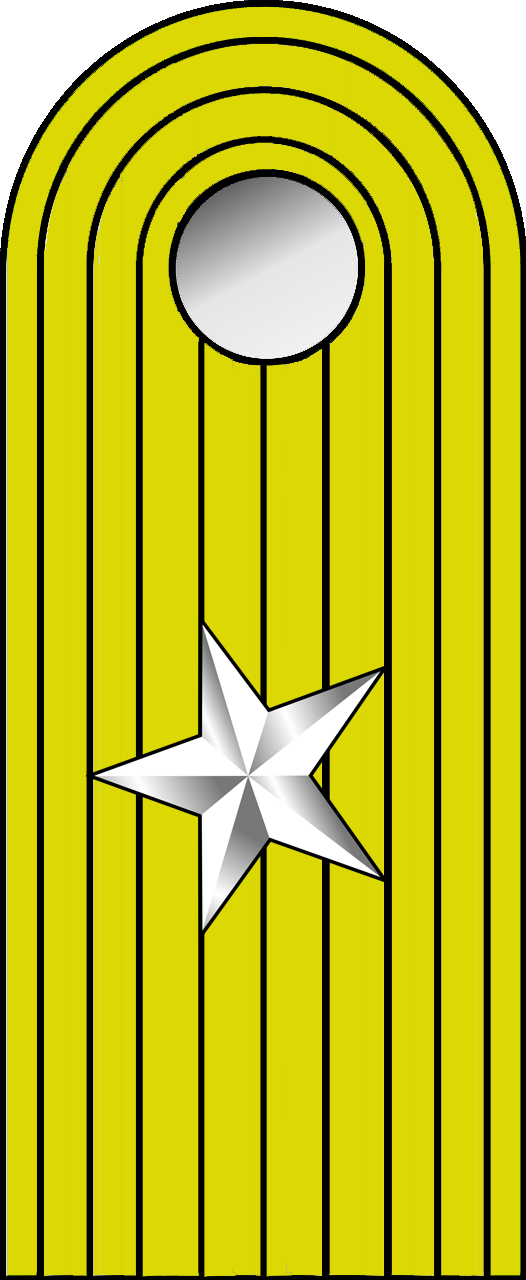
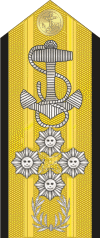
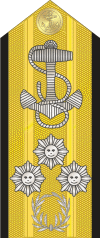
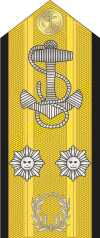
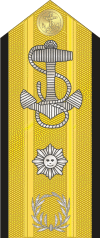
Rank group	General / flag officers				Senior officers			Junior officers
Venezuelan Army
Venezuelan Army	General en jefe	Mayor general	General de division	General de brigada	Coronel	Teniente coronel	Mayor	Capitán	Primer teniente	Teniente
Bolivarian Navy of Venezuela
Bolivarian Navy of Venezuela	Almirante en jefe	Almirante	Vicealmirante	Contraalmirante	Capitán de navío	Capitán de fragata	Capitán de corbeta	Teniente de navío	Teniente de fragata	Teniente de corbeta
Venezuelan Air Force
Venezuelan Air Force	General en jefe	Mayor general	General de division	General de brigada	Coronel	Teniente coronel	Mayor	Capitán	Primer teniente	Teniente
Rank group	General / flag officers				Senior officers			Junior officers

=== Student officer ranks ===
In the 5 military schools of Venezuela, special military ranks are used by officer candidates and aspirants, with Cadet as the lowest rank, and with the highest ranks of Ensign or Midshipman depending on the service academy save for the Military Technical Academy, Military Medical Academy and Troop Officers Military College whose cadets come from all the service branches, and are ranked as per their service academies.

Rank group	Student officers
	Alférez mayor	Alférez auxilar	Alférez	Brigadier mayor	Primer brigadier	Brigadier	Sub-brigadier	Distinguido	Cadete
	Guardiamarina mayor	Guardiamarina auxiliar	Guardiamarina	Brigadier mayor	Brigadier primero	Brigadier	Sub-brigadier	Distinguido	Cadete

Rank insignia for the cadets of the service academies are both on the shoulders and on the sleeves of all uniforms save for the combat uniform. Military high schools share the same insignia but use different ranks.

== Technical Non-commissioned officers and Warrant officers ==
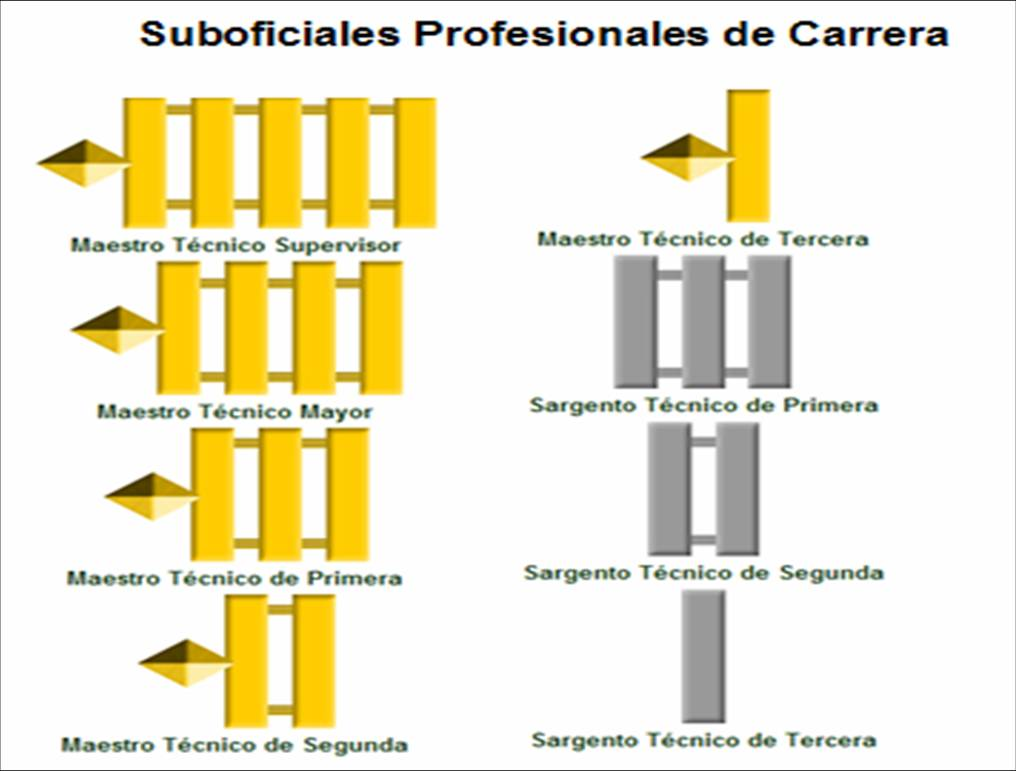
Professional Career Warrant Officer ranks of the National Armed Forces (Army, Air Force, National Guard and Militia version).

These were, until their transformation into the technical officers corps in 2009, technical high-ranking non-commissioned personnel and warrant officers, with a technical and professional degree, which are usually assigned to technical positions inside the National Armed Forces and as warrant officers in the different service arms. While the insignia for the ground and air forces and the National Guard and Militia (featured here) are both on the shoulders and collars, naval insignia are also used on the sleeve.

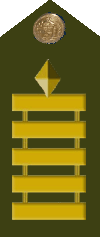
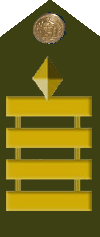
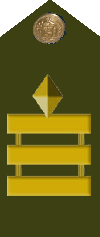
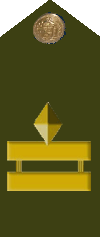
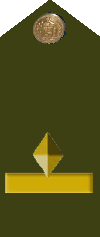
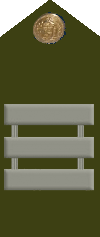
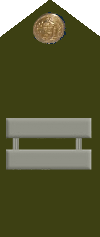
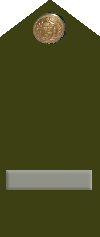
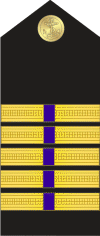
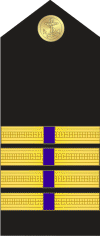
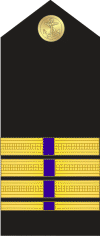
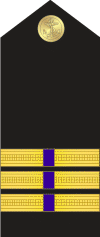
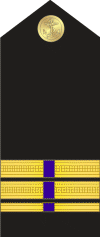
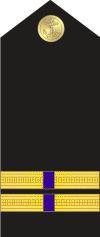
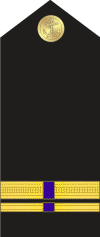
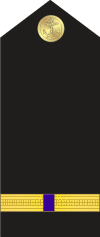
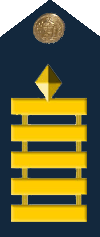
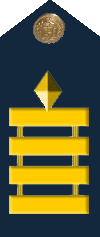
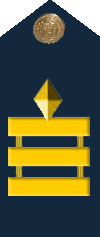
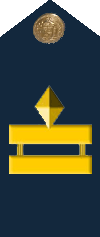
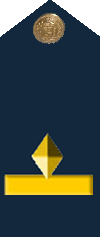
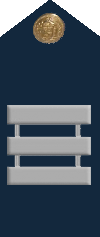
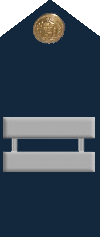
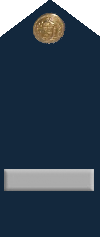
	Warrant officers					Senior non-commissioned officers
Venezuelan Army
Venezuelan Army	Maestro Técnico Supervisor	Maestro Técnico Mayor	Maestro Técnico De Primera	Maestro Técnico De Segunda	Maestro Técnico De Tercera	Sargento Técnico de Primera	Sargento Técnico de Segunda	Sargento Técnico de Tercera
Bolivarian Navy of Venezuela
Bolivarian Navy of Venezuela	Maestro Técnico Supervisor	Maestro Técnico Mayor	Maestre Técnico Principal	Maestre Auxiliar	Maestre Técnico	Maestre de Primera	Maestre de Segunda	Maestre de Tercera
Venezuelan Air Force
Venezuelan Air Force	Maestro Técnico Supervisor	Maestro Técnico Mayor	Maestro Técnico De Primera	Maestro Técnico De Segunda	Maestre Técnico De Tercera	Sargento Técnico de Primera	Sargento Técnico de Segunda	Sargento Técnico de Tercera

== Other ranks ==
The rank insignia of non-commissioned officers and enlisted personnel.

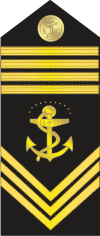
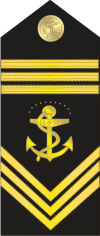
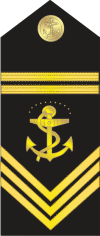
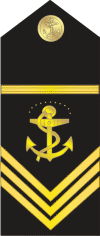
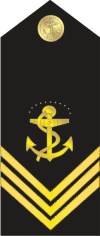
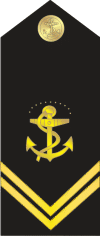
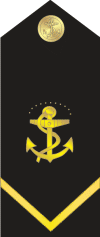
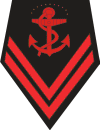
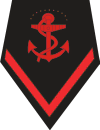
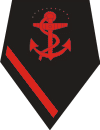
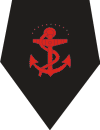
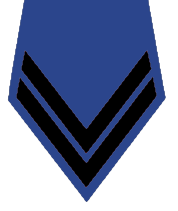
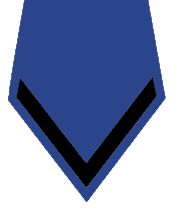
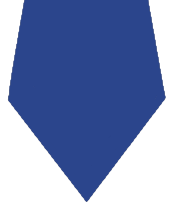
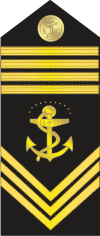
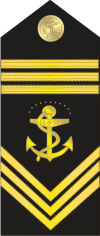
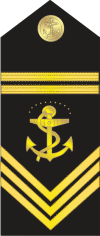
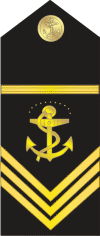
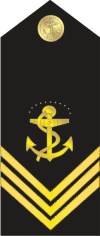
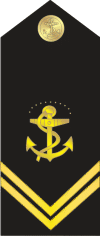
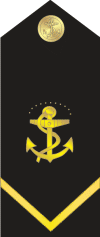
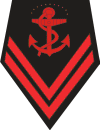
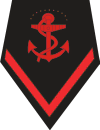
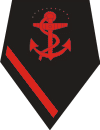
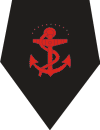
Rank group	Senior NCOs							Junior NCOs		Enlisted
Venezuelan Army											No insignia
Venezuelan Army	Sargento supervisor	Sargento ayudante	Sargento mayor de primera	Sargento mayor de segunda	Sargento mayor de tercera	Sargento primero	Sargento segundo	Cabo primero	Cabo segundo	Distinguido	Soldado raso
Bolivarian Navy of Venezuela
Bolivarian Navy of Venezuela	Sargento supervisor	Sargento ayudante	Sargento mayor de primera	Sargento mayor de segunda	Sargento mayor de tercera	Sargento primero	Sargento segundo	Cabo primero	Cabo segundo	Distinguido	Marinero raso
Venezuelan Air Force											No insignia
Venezuelan Air Force	Sargento supervisor	Sargento ayudante	Sargento mayor de primera	Sargento mayor de segunda	Sargento mayor de tercera	Sargento primero	Sargento segundo	Cabo primero	Cabo segundo	Distinguido	Aviador
Venezuelan National Guard											No insignia
Venezuelan National Guard	Sargento supervisor	Sargento ayudante	Sargento mayor de primera	Sargento mayor de segunda	Sargento mayor de tercera	Sargento primero	Sargento segundo	Cabo primero	Cabo segundo	Distinguido	Guardia Nacional raso
Bolivarian Militia of Venezuela (Ground element)											No insignia
Bolivarian Militia of Venezuela (Ground element)	Sargento supervisor	Sargento ayudante	Sargento mayor de primera	Sargento mayor de segunda	Sargento mayor de tercera	Sargento primero	Sargento segundo	Cabo primero	Cabo segundo	Distinguido	Miliciano
Bolivarian Militia of Venezuela (People's Navy)
Bolivarian Militia of Venezuela (People's Navy)	Sargento supervisor	Sargento ayudante	Sargento mayor de primera	Sargento mayor de segunda	Sargento mayor de tercera	Sargento primero	Sargento segundo	Cabo primero	Cabo segundo	Distinguido	Miliciano Marina Popular
Rank group	Senior NCOs							Junior NCOs		Enlisted

== See also ==
- National Bolivarian Armed Forces of Venezuela
