= Un Mundo Sin Mordaza =

Venezuelan non-governmental organization

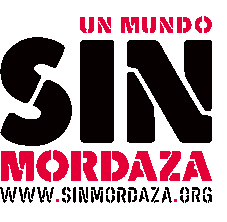
- Formation: 2009
- Type: Non-governmental organization
- Headquarters: Caracas, Venezuela
- Region served: Worldwide
- Fields: Human rights activism
- Director: Rodrigo Diamanti (President and Founder)
- Website: sinmordaza.org

Un Mundo Sin Mordaza (transl. A World Without a Gag) is a Venezuelan non-governmental organization founded in 2009, whose stated mission is denouncing attacks on freedom of expression and human rights violations. The organization has global volunteers who coordinate campaigns that use music, art and culture to promote human rights and democratic values, as well as raise awareness about the complex humanitarian emergency (CHE) in Venezuela. The organization trains and educates human rights activists worldwide, while also supporting initiatives of documentation of fundamental rights violation in Venezuela.

Un Mundo Sin Mordaza was founded by Rodrigo Diamanti, a Venezuelan human rights activist and economist graduated from the Universidad Católica Andrés Bello (UCAB), with a master's degree in international diplomacy from the Universidad Ortega y Gasset in Madrid, and MPA from the Harvard Kennedy School where he worked as a researcher at the Ash Center for Democratic Governance and Innovation.

On May 7, 2014, Diamanti was arrested by the Bolivarian Intelligence Service (SEBIN) for allegedly supporting anti-government protests and creating a global campaign called SOS Venezuela. He was released two days later with precautionary measures. Diamanti was reportedly harassed by the Minister of Interior and Justice, General Miguel Rodríguez Torres, as well as on the program Con El Mazo Dando.

== Operations ==
=== Activism ===
Un Mundo Sin Mordaza has carried out several global campaigns and protests with mobilizations, including SOS Venezuela, Free DirecTV, and AlzaLaVoz. The organization also conducts training programs, bootcamps and forums for activists. It has collaborations with international partners and allies.

Notable activist campaigns include:

- SOS Venezuela (2014): The SOS Venezuela campaign was started in 2014 to draw attention to the human rights situation in the country. As part of the campaign, peaceful demonstrations were carried out in 20 countries, denouncing repression and violence in Venezuela, and raising awareness on the situation of political prisoners and attacks on the press in the country. The campaign received support from artists such as Ricardo Montaner, Ricky Martin, Juanes, Madonna, Jared Leto, and Luis Fonsi.
- NoMásDictadura (2017): The NoMásDictadura (transl. No More Dictatorship) hashtag campaign raised awareness about the struggle against the authoritarian and oppressive regime in Venezuela, with peaceful protests and rallies being held in more than 50 cities globally.
- International mobilization for the right to vote of the Venezuelan Diaspora (November 26, 2023): This mobilization saw the participation of the Venezuelan diaspora in 24 cities around the world, who demanded the upholding of the results of the primary elections held on October 22, the lifting of unconstitutional political disqualifications, and the right to vote of Venezuelans abroad in the 2024 presidential elections.

=== Artivism ===
Un Mundo Sin Mordaza has employed artivism as a means of denunciation. It conducts artivist events such as concerts, standup comedy shows, forums and contests. It has held contests in photography, music, poster, film, writing and illustration to promote artivism.

Notable artivism events include:

- Tú Voz Es Tú Poder: Tú Voz Es Tú Poder was a musical festival with three editions in 2013, 2016 and 2017 when music was used as a means of protest and human rights defense. The concerts had more than 40 artists and bands participating in front of more than 30,000 people in Caracas. The Tú Voz Es Tú Poder musical album was released in 2017.
- The Right Cut: The Right Cut was a short film contest that had three editions. The first edition in 2016 received 29 entries from 9 countries, with the theme being demand for democracy and protection of human rights. The second edition in 2019 had 68 videos from 14 countries on the central theme of freedom of expression. The third edition received 40 video entries from 7 countries, illustrating the impact of pandemic on the socioeconomic conditions, quality of life and human rights violations.

== Reports ==
Un Mundo Sin Mordaza is part of the Crimes Against Humanity Network along with the Observatory of Crimes Against Humanity and Defiende Venezuela. The Network documents and identifies victims affected by human right violations and shares the reports with the International Criminal Court.

Among notable reports prepared by the organization are the Report on Current Immigration Framework for Venezuelans, which is a guide to immigration laws in other countries; the Freedom of Expression Report, which documents freedom of expression violations committed by the state; the Citizen Self-Censorship Report, which is a survey on self-censorship among Venezuelan citizens; and the Venezuela in Numbers Report, which collects thematic data in context of the humanitarian emergency.

- Annual Freedom of Expression Report 2019 – documented 55 journalists arrested arbitrarily, 9 television channels taken off air, 15 opinion programs censored, 11 radio stations closed, 800 web portals blocked, among others.
- Migration and Refugee Report 2020 – recorded the conditions and reasons behind Venezuelans migrating; 78% of the surveyed population left the country for socioeconomic reasons, 10.5% due to violence and 8.5% because of political persecution.
- Annual Freedom of Expression Report 2020 – documented 40 arbitrary arrests and 31 detentions of journalists, 4 televisions temporarily blocked, 19 radio stations taken off air, 19 blockages to web portals, among others.
- Biannual Freedom of Expression Report 2021 – documented 29 arbitrary arrests and detentions of journalists and civilians, 22 cases of threats towards TV channels and radio stations, including censorship through administrative or judicial sanctions, among others, in the first half of the year.
- Venezuela in Figures 2021 – documented numbers of Venezuelans affected by the complex humanitarian emergency (CHE) and covered figures pertaining to themes such as economy, health, public services, protests, citizen security and electoral conditions.
- Report on Citizen Self-Censorship 2022 – analyzed self-censorship by Venezuelan citizens on account of measures taken by the state security forces and fear of government reprisals.
- Annual Report on Freedom of Expression 2022 – recorded 97 cases of persecution of press workers and civilians, 11 arrests and 1 murder, 11 blockages to websites, and 89 attacks on media.

== Awards and nominations ==
- 2021 Napolitan Victory Awards – Best Campaign of the Year (Nominated)
- 2022 Thomson Reuters Foundation TrustLaw Awards – Collaboration Award (Won)

== See also ==
- Foro Penal
- PROVEA
- Venezuelan Observatory of Social Conflict
- Protests against Nicolás Maduro
