= Samuel Moncada =

Venezuelan politician and diplomat

Permanent Representative of Venezuela to the United Nations
- In office 5 December 2017 – 5 January 2026
- President: Nicolás Maduro
- Preceded by: Rafael Ramírez

Minister of Foreign Affairs
- In office 21 June 2017 – 2 August 2017
- President: Nicolás Maduro
- Preceded by: Delcy Rodriguez
- Succeeded by: Jorge Arreaza

Ambassador of Venezuela to the Organization of American States
- In office 27 March 2017 – 22 January 2019
- President: Nicolás Maduro
- Succeeded by: Gustavo Tarre

Minister of University Education
- In office 2004–2006
- President: Hugo Chávez
- Preceded by: Fabio Quijada
- Succeeded by: Luis Acuña

Personal details
- Born: Samuel Reinaldo Moncada Acosta; June 13, 1959 (age 66) Caracas, Venezuela
- Education: Central University of Venezuela (UCV)
- Occupation: Politician and diplomat

Samuel Reinaldo Moncada Acosta (born 13 June 1959) is a Venezuelan politician and diplomat currently serving as Permanent Representative of Venezuela to the United Nations since 2017 and formerly served as Alternate Representative of Venezuela to the Organization of American States from 2017 to 2019. He was Venezuela's deputy foreign minister until June 2017, when he succeeded Delcy Rodriguez as Venezuela's Foreign Minister. On August 2, 2017, following the 2017 Venezuelan Constituent Assembly election, President Nicolás Maduro appointed former Vice President Jorge Arreaza to replace Moncada as the new Foreign Affairs Minister.

== Biography ==
Moncada graduated in history at the Central University of Venezuela.

Between 2004 and 2006, he was Minister of Higher Education of President Hugo Chavez and director of the History School of the Central University of Venezuela. Moncada was Ambassador of Venezuela to the United Nations in 2013. He also was Venezuela's ambassador to the United Kingdom of Great Britain and Northern Ireland.

Later, he served as Ambassador of Venezuela to the Organization of American States (OAS) and as head of the Presidential Commission of the Non-Aligned Movement.

Moncada assumed the Vice-Ministry for North America, and then replaced Delcy Rodríguez as Foreign Affairs Minister during the 2017 Constituent Assembly election. After the elections were over, President Nicolás Maduro appointed former Vice President Jorge Arreaza as his successor, for which Moncada returned to exercise his functions as Vice Minister and Ambassador of Venezuela to the OAS.

In 2017 Maduro also appointed Moncada as Venezuela's Permanent Representative to the United Nations.

=== Ambassador to OAS ===
In January 2019 (during the 2019 Venezuelan presidential crisis), the National Assembly of Venezuela appointed Gustavo Tarre Briceño as representative to the OAS, an international organization which does not recognize Nicolás Maduro as president. On April 9, 2019, the OAS voted 18 to 9, with six abstentions, to accept Tarre as the ambassador from Venezuela until new presidential elections can be held.

The permanent council approved text saying "Nicolas Maduro's presidential authority lacks legitimacy and his designations for government posts, therefore, lack the necessary legitimacy." Antigua and Barbuda, Bolivia, Dominica, Grenada, Mexico, Saint Vincent and the Grenadines, Suriname, Uruguay and Venezuela voted against the change. Maduro's administration responded calling Tarre a "political usurper". According to The Washington Post, this acceptance undermines Maduro's presence internationally and marks a step in the official recognition of Guaidó's government. Voice of America called it an "historic vote".

Tarre's appointment encouraged similar actions against the Maduro government by other international bodies. On April 10, 2019 the International Monetary Fund cut off Venezuelan access until a majority of its members recognized a Maduro or Guaidó representative, and the United States Vice President Mike Pence requested that the United Nations replace ongoing ambassador Samuel Moncada with a Guaidó-aligned one.

== See also ==
- List of ministers of foreign affairs of Venezuela
- List of foreign ministers in 2017

Political offices
Preceded by Delcy Rodriguez	190th Minister of Foreign Affairs; 21 June 2017 – 2 August 2017	Succeeded by Jorge Arreaza
