= Statute Governing the Transition to Democracy =

Venezuelan statute

The Statute Governing the Transition to Democracy to Re-establish the Validity of the Constitution of the Bolivarian Republic of Venezuela (Spanish: Estatuto que rige la Transición a la democracia para restablecer la vigencia de la Constitución de la República Bolivariana de Venezuela) is a statute adopted by the Venezuelan National Assembly that defines the "duration of a transition government and its political and economic responsibilities". Approved on 5 February 2019, through its seven chapters and thirty-nine articles, the Transition Statute "governs the installation of a provisional Government and the convocation of free elections", and "establishes the election of new rectors of the National Electoral Council, new magistrates of the Supreme Tribunal of Justice and new representatives of the Citizen Power." It also establishes that – in the absence of a constitutionally elected president – the National Assembly President is the Acting President of Venezuela.

According to constitutional law professor Juan Manuel Raffalli, the Transition Statute "establish[es] rules that organize the process of restoration of constitutional order that (...) was broken on 10 January 2019", referencing the date of the second inauguration of Nicolás Maduro which led to the 2019 Venezuelan presidential crisis. According to El Universal, the Statute "rescues" the electoral process with the aim of free elections. It also establishes budgetary and financial governance with respect to CITGO and PDVSA, and the use and recovery of these petroleum industry assets.

The pro-Maduro Supreme Tribunal did not recognize the Transition Statute and declared it void. The law was reformed in December 2022 to eliminate the transitional government and establish a separate commission to protect the country's assets outside of Venezuela.

== Purpose ==
Raffalli states that the National Assembly and the Transition Statute declare that Nicolás Maduro has occupied the Presidency since 10 January "without having submitted to a legitimate electoral process". Article 333 of the Constitution of Venezuela calls for citizens to restore and enforce the constitution if it is not followed; Juan Guaidó and the National Assembly argue that a transitional government must restore Venezuela's rule of law and hold democratic elections, but Raffalli explains that Article 333 "does not contain specific details" about how to "restore the constitutional order", and that the statute was formulated "to give a rational order to the process of political transition to which [Article 333's] content refers". According to Raffalli, "the Statute clearly states that the rescue of popular sovereignty and the restoration of constitutional order will be definitively achieved by holding free, authentic, transparent, competitive and fair presidential elections. It provides that these elections be convened within 30 days after the date on which the usurpation [of the presidency] ceases, and will be made as soon as technically possible, but within a maximum period of 12 months."

Juan Miguel Matheus – National Assembly deputy representing Carabobo state and president of the Commission for the Defense of the Constitution – drafted the statute. He says the statute "establishes the legal framework for action of the Acting President and the National Assembly to enable the rescue of the rule of law", and that the purpose of the statute "is to legally frame the transition process within the 1999 Constitution". He explained that the statute allows the National Assembly to advance towards elections even with Maduro present, stating that "... some actions that can be carried out while the usurpation exists, and others are reserved for when the usurpation ceases." Articles 6 and 20 provide for the National Assembly to advance electoral processes while a provisional government is formed, and until a new National Electoral Council can hold full elections.

== Transition to elections ==
Matheus explains in an article for Tal Cual entitled "12 questions and answers on the Statute that governs the transition to democracy" (Spanish: 12 preguntas y respuestas sobre el Estatuto que rige la transición a la democracia) how the Transition Statute provide for ultimately restoring constitutional order and naming a President of the Republic in free elections. He says the purpose of the statute is laid out in Article 2 as the three steps towards restoration of democracy: 1) end the usurpation of the office of the presidency, 2) form a provisional government, and 3) hold free elections. Article 3 aims to reverse the "complex humanitarian crisis" by restoring constitutional order.

Articles 8–12 hold that there has not been a legitimate president elected to the 2019–2025 term, nullify all acts of Nicolás Maduro since 10 January, and provides for the end of duty for public officials and members of the Armed Forces to obey Maduro. Article 13 states that the National Assembly's constitutional term ends on 4 January 2021.

Article 14 defines the office of acting president and its timing, in accordance with Article 233 of the Venezuelan Constitution, as the President of the National Assembly. He writes, until "the usurpation ceases, Juan Guaidó is simultaneously President of the National Assembly and Acting President of the Bolivarian Republic of Venezuela"; the "thirty days begin within which Juan Guaidó must be separated from the Presidency of the National Assembly to exercise only and exclusively as Acting President (...) and proceed to adopt the necessary measures for the realization of free and competitive elections. During these thirty days the deputy Juan Guaidó will be replaced by the vice-presidents of the National Assembly, in accordance with the Internal Regulation and Debates."

Article 26 defines a provisional president; after the 30-day period of Article 233 has passed "without it being possible to hold free and competitive elections, the National Assembly may ratify the acting President as provisional President (...) for the purpose of forming a government of national unity until free elections are held and there is a President-elect who can complete the 2019–2025 period". Then elections must be held within at most twelve months or the shortest possible time allowed by technical conditions. The person elected will be sworn in as soon as possible, and serve the remainder of the 2019–2025 term.

== Other provisions ==
The Transition Statute establishes budgetary and financial governance for CITGO and PDVSA, and the use and recovery of these petroleum industry assets. It authorizes the National Assembly to "appoint the directors of the state-run PDVSA petroleum company and its affiliates [and] control recovered assets".
