= Gustavo Tarre =

Venezuelan politician, lawyer, author and professor

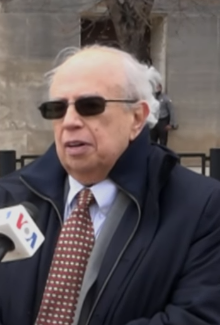
- Gustavo Tarre in March 2019

Ambassador of Venezuela to the Organization of American States
- Incumbent
- Assumed office 29 January 2019
- Appointed by: National Assembly of Venezuela
- President: Juan Guaidó

Member of the Chamber of Deputies of Venezuela
- In office 23 January 1994 – 23 January 1999

Personal details
- Born: Gustavo Tarre Briceño
- Occupation: Lawyer, politician

Gustavo Tarre Briceño is a Venezuelan politician, lawyer, author, professor of constitutional law and politic science, and representative to the Organization of American States (OAS).

Tarre was named by Venezuela's National Assembly as a Special Representative to the OAS on 22 January during the 2019 Venezuelan presidential crisis. On 9 April 2019, the OAS voted to recognize him as the ambassador and representative from Venezuela. Since then he has also been Executive Director for Venezuela and Panama at the Inter-American Development Bank

== Education and affiliations ==
Tarre obtain his law degree in 1969 from the Central University of Venezuela (UCV). In 1971, he studied economics and finance at the Institut International d’Administration Publique, and in 1972, received a graduate degree from the Université de Paris II in public law. He also has a degree from the Instituto de Estudios Superiores de Administración (a business school in Venezuela) in advanced management.

Tarre is a senior associate for the Center for Strategic and International Studies. At the Inter-American Dialogue, he was a senior adviser from 2015 to 2016, as an adviser in the Rule of Law program.

== Political career ==
Tarre was a member of Venezuela's congress, the Venezuelan Chamber of Deputies, between 1970 and 1999. In the early 90s, he was the whip and minority leader for Copei, the Christian Socialism party in Venezuela, He chaired three committees (Energy and Mining, Finance, and Internal Politics), served on three others (Legislation, Armed Forces, and Foreign Policy), and was a member of the Presidential Commission for State Reform. According to his biography for the Center for Strategic and International Studies (CSIS), "he worked on legislation on the Supreme Court and judicial system, anticorruption, decentralization, congressional ethics, banking, housing, human rights, oil regulations, and Chamber of Deputies regulations, among others".

== Professional career ==
Tarre specializes in constitutional law; before his nomination as a representative to the OAS, he was in private practice. He was a director of Quórum Asuntos Públicos, a consulting firm specializing in political risk, from 1999 to 2014.

He was a professor for 27 years; at the UCV, he taught constitutional law, and at Simón Bolívar University, he taught political science. At George Washington University in Washington D.C., he is a consultant in the Governance Program for Latin America in the Graduate School of Political Management.

== Chavismo and presidential crisis ==
Tarre has written for CSIS about corruption, democracy, and the Chavista administrations in Venezuela, stating in 2018:

Rarely has a country lived, for a period of almost two decades, in a worse combination of incompetence, mediocrity, systematic theft of public goods and money, ideological perversion, pettiness, lack of scruples, and systematic violation of human rights. ... Corruption is not compatible with democracy. We have seen this story play out in Venezuela, Italy, Brazil, Greece—and now even more recently in Spain and Mexico.

He was accused in 2014 by the then mayor of the Libertador Municipality, Jorge Rodríguez, of being one of the intellectual authors of an alleged plan to assassinate Maduro. Rodríguez claimed that María Corina Machado had written Tarre with instructions for carrying out "the plan"; Henrique Salas Römer and Diego Arria were also accused. Nicolás Maduro's administration accused him, again, of being an "intellectual author" of the Caracas drone attack against Maduro in 2018.

Gustavo Tarre Briceño interviewed for Con La Luz in 2019

According to El País, Venezuelans Carlos Vecchio and Julio Borges were key in consultations with the Trump administration decision on 22 January to back Juan Guaidó in the 2019 Venezuelan presidential crisis. Guaidó began to appoint individuals in late January to serve as aides or diplomats, including Vecchio as the Guaidó administration's diplomatic envoy to the US, Borges to represent Venezuela in the Lima Group, and Tarre as the special representative from Venezuela to the OAS.

Guaidó contacted Tarre by phone the night before the 22 January decision, asking him to serve as the OAS representative. El Pais quotes Tarre:

"I knew that this was serious, I am a professor of Constitutional Law, I was being called by the President of the Republic and I told him that I was at his service," explains Tarre. By then, he admits, "it was very easy to assume" that important countries like the United States were going to recognize Guaidó, "and part of one's job was to help make that happen." The next day, the 22nd, is when the Assembly votes for Tarre and in the White House the decision is being finalized.

On 9 April, the OAS voted 18 to 9, with six abstentions, to accept Tarre as the ambassador from Venezuela until new elections can be held. The permanent council approved text saying "Nicolas Maduro's presidential authority lacks legitimacy and his designations for government posts, therefore, lack the necessary legitimacy." Antigua and Barbuda, Bolivia, Dominica, Grenada, Mexico, Saint Vincent and the Grenadines, Suriname, Uruguay and Venezuela voted against the change. Maduro's administration responded calling Tarre a "political usurper". According to The Washington Post, this acceptance undermines Maduro's presence internationally and marks a step in the official recognition of Guaidó's government. Voice of America called it an "historic vote". His appointment in this way encouraged similar actions in other international forums; on 10 April the International Monetary Fund cut off Venezuelan access until a majority of its members recognized a Maduro or Guaidó representative, and the United States Vice President Mike Pence requested that the United Nations replace their ambassador with a Guaidó one.

In October 2022, a bloc of leftist OAS member states led a motion to remove Tarre's representation in the organization. Out of 35 members, 19 nations voted in favor of the motion and 4 against. The motion fell short of the 24 votes required for a two-thirds majority.

== Publications ==
- Carta Abierta a los Copeyanos. Ediciones Centauro. 1990.
- El Espejo Roto. Editorial Panapo. 1995.
- Luisa y Cristóbal. Fundación para la Cultura Urbana. 2005.
- Solo el Poder Detiene al Poder: La Teoría de la Separación de Poderes y su Aplicación en Venezuela. Editorial Jurídica Venezolana. 2014.
