= Fabiana Rosales =

Venezuelan journalist (born 1992)

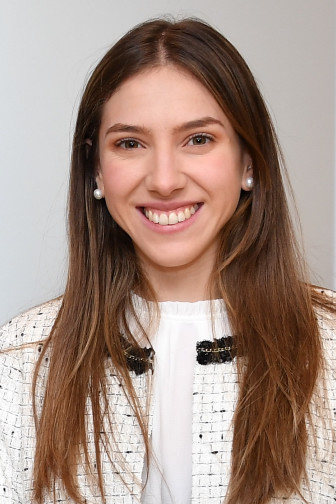
- Born: Fabiana Andreina Rosales Guerrero; 22 April 1992 (age 34); Tovar, Mérida, Venezuela
- Education: Rafael Belloso Chacín University
- Occupation: Journalist
- Known for: First Lady of Venezuela (2019–2023; Disputed)
- Political party: Popular Will
- Spouse: Juan Guaidó (m. 2013)
- Children: 2

Fabiana Andreina Rosales Guerrero (born 22 April 1992), also known as Fabiana Rosales de Guaidó, is a Venezuelan journalist and social media human rights activist. She is married to Juan Guaidó, former disputed president of the National Assembly and claimant to the country's acting presidency in the Venezuelan presidential crisis. She was considered by the White House to be the first lady of Venezuela, but, following the dissolution of the interim government, is no longer.

== Family and education ==
Fabiana Andreína Rosales Guerrero was born on 22 April 1992 in the town of Tovar, Mérida State. Her father, Carlos Rosales Belandria was a farmer and her mother, Elsy Guerrero a journalist. As a child, she observed her mother's interviews and became interested in social issues. She assisted in running the family farm and decided to study journalism. Her father died after having a heart attack in 2013, for which she blames the shortages in Venezuela. Her cousin died similarly, because products for a blood transfusion could not be found. In 2013, she graduated from Universidad Rafael Belloso Chacín with a degree in journalism and social communications. She worked in Mérida state for a city council as a press officer, and later held a similar position after moving to Caracas.

Rosales met Juan Guaidó at a youth rally, and they married in 2013. They have a daughter who was born in 2017.

== Political activism ==
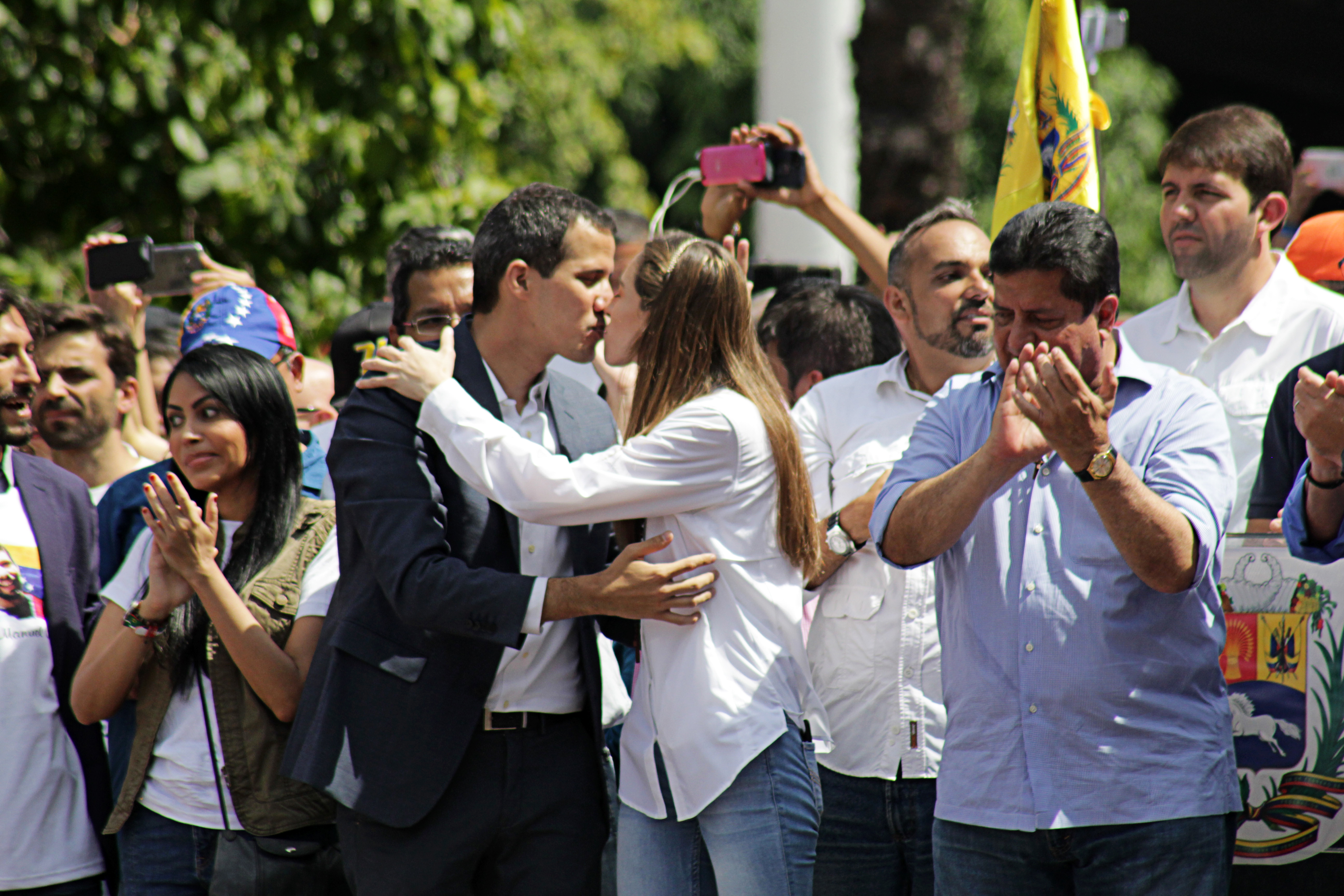
Rosales with Juan Guaidó at a protest in February 2019

During her university studies, Rosales began working for the opposition party Popular Will (Spanish: Voluntad Popular). As a human rights activist, she had close to 150,000 followers on Instagram as of 26 January 2019. She has stated that a motivating factor for her is that she does not "want [her] daughter to grow up wanting to leave Venezuela", and that she is "working for [her] daughter to inherit a better country".

During the Venezuelan presidential crisis, Guaidó was designated acting president by the Venezuelan National Assembly, contesting the legitimacy of Nicolás Maduro. More than 50 governments have recognized Guaidó as the acting president of Venezuela, which implicitly gives Rosales a claim to being the First Lady of Venezuela. She told Reuters that spies and "pro-government armed groups" follow her and Guaidó.

=== Foreign relations ===
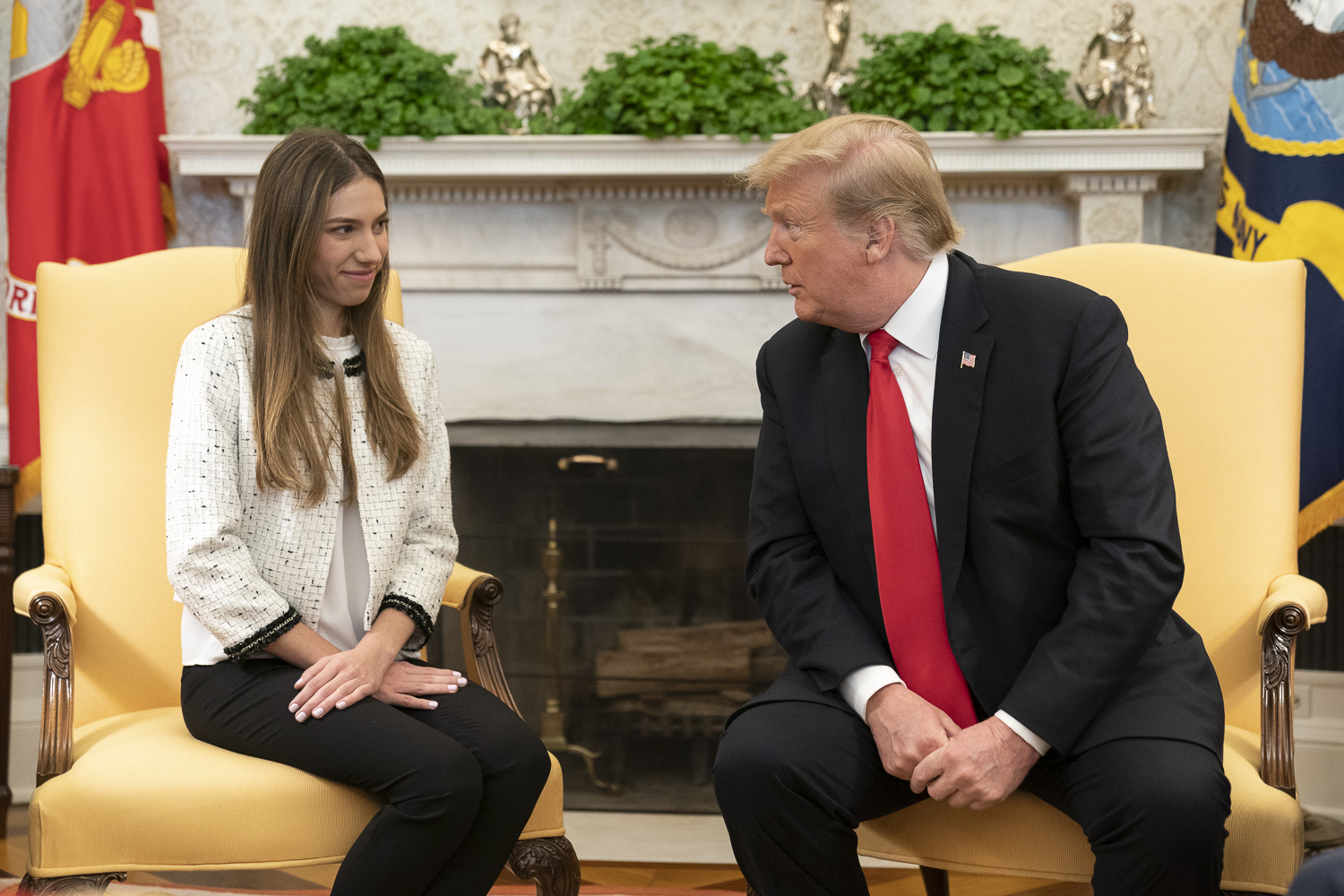
Rosales with Donald Trump

The New York Times says Rosales is "emerging as a prominent figure in [Guaidó's] campaign to bring change to the crisis-wracked country". She has assumed the role of international ambassador for the opposition, meeting with Venezuelan diaspora and regional leaders to solicit support for the opposition and her country. Rosales started in Latin America, meeting with Martín Vizcarra and Sebastián Piñera, presidents of Peru and Chile respectively, in March 2019.

On 27 March, she visited the White House to meet with US President Donald Trump and Vice President Mike Pence. She said that the crisis in Venezuela is serious, describing it as "freedom or dictatorship, life or death". Trump said it was a "great honor to have the first lady of Venezuela". From Washington, D.C., she went next to a meeting with Miami mayor Carlos A. Giménez, where she was given the key to Miami-Dade County.

The Associated Press wrote that her "opponents have cast her recent tour as a desperate attempt to keep Guaido in the international spotlight", and quoted a diplomat from the Maduro administration, who said, "She is trying to boost Guaido's image, as support for his movement in Venezuela deflates".
