= Isadora Zubillaga =

Venezuelan diplomat and activist

Ambassador of Venezuela to France
- Incumbent
- Assumed office 19 January 2019
- Appointed by: National Assembly of Venezuela
- President: Juan Guaidó

Personal details
- Born: Isadora del Valle Suárez Guevara; 1968 (age 57–58) Caracas, Venezuela
- Citizenship: Venezuela (birthplace), Spain (naturalized in 2017)
- Occupation: Activist, diplomat

Isadora del Valle Suárez Guevara (born 1968) is a Venezuelan senior advisor, former diplomat and activist for democracy in Venezuela. In 2019 she was appointed by the National Assembly as Venezuela's ambassador to France, and in September of the same year she was appointed as deputy presidential commissioner for Venezuela's foreign relations. She held this position until 5 January 2023.

== Career ==
Isadora holds a bachelor's degree in economics and political science from Boston University and a master's degree in international relations from the Sorbonne University in Paris. She has worked as coordinator of human rights projects for the Robert F. Kennedy Foundation and international coordinator of NYC2010 under the direction of Michael Bloomberg. Zubillaga also served on the board of directors of the French Alliance of Caracas, is a founding member of the Popular Will opposition party and served as international director of the Chacao mayor's office under the administration of Leopoldo López.

Since the arrest of Leopoldo López in 2014, Zubillaga and her family have been subjected to "systematic denunciations by the government of Nicolás Maduro and harassment in the state-controlled media". Isadora moved to Spain after suffering an express kidnapping and has been living in Europe since 2014. On 21 July 2017, when her passport was about to expire and "with null chances of being renewed," the Spanish Council of Ministers decided to grant her Spanish nationality.

She has been an international advisor to Leopoldo López; as of 2021, she was director of the foundation Código Venezuela, a non-governmental organization dedicated to supporting the Venezuelan diaspora. She has also chaired the Association for Freedom and Democracy in Venezuela.

During the Venezuelan presidential crisis, on 19 February 2019, she was appointed by the National Assembly as Venezuela's ambassador to France and was subsequently appointed as deputy presidential commissioner for Venezuela's foreign relations in September 2019.

== See also ==
- France–Venezuela relations
