= Carlos Vecchio =

Venezuelan lawyer, politician and activist

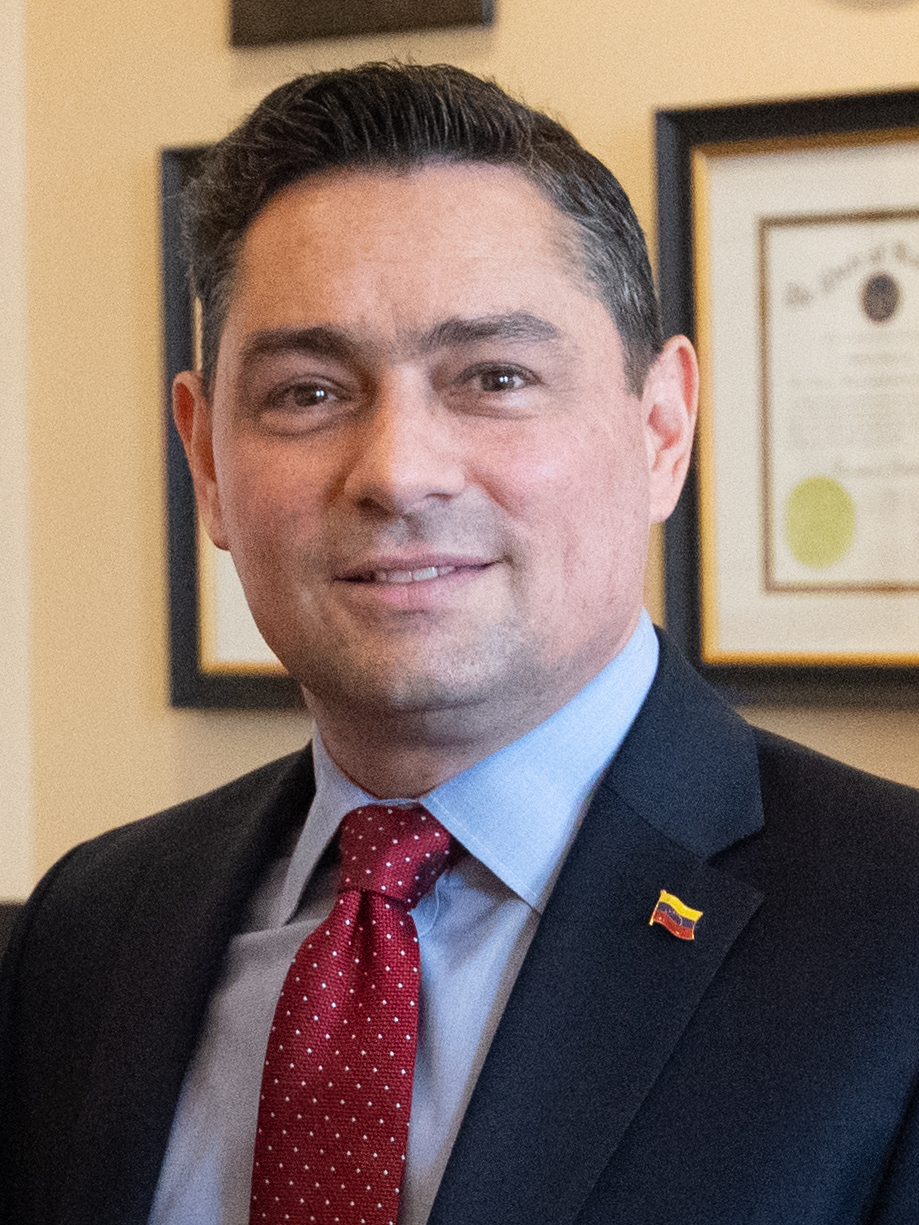

Ambassador of Venezuela to the United States (Note: As appointed by disputed president Juan Guaidó; not recognized by the administration of Nicolás Maduro, see Venezuelan presidential crisis for further details)
- In office 27 January 2019 – 1 January 2023
- Appointed by: National Assembly of Venezuela
- President: Juan Guaidó

Personal details
- Born: 6 June 1969 (age 57) Caripe, Monagas, Venezuela
- Party: Popular Will (Voluntad Popular)
- Education: Central University of Venezuela, Georgetown University, Harvard University

Carlos Alfredo Vecchio DeMari (born 6 June 1969) is a Venezuelan lawyer, politician and social activist, designated as Ambassador to the US by Juan Guaidó in January 2019 during the 2019 Venezuelan presidential crisis. His credential letter was accepted by U.S. President Donald Trump on 9 April 2019. After his ambassadorial term ended, he became Head of External Affairs at the Inter-American Development Bank in Washington DC.

== Early life and education ==
Vecchio was born on 6 June 1969 in Caripe, Monagas state, Venezuela, the youngest of three children, to Maria Teresa Demari de Vecchio, a teacher, and Rafael Vecchio, a political activist and three-term council person for Caripe. He moved to Caracas in 1987, studied at the Central University of Venezuela, and earned his law degree in 1992.

He did postgraduate studies in law at Georgetown University and public administration at Harvard University, where he was a Fulbright scholar at the Kennedy School of Government.

== Legal career ==
From 1994 to 1998, Vecchio was a legal consult for Venezuela's state-run oil company, PDVSA. Vecchio then returned to work as a tax manager for ExxonMobil in Venezuela. After Chávez expropriated ExxonMobil's assets within Venezuela, in 2006 Vecchio's boss offered him a position in Qatar that included a pay increase, an assigned house and car, a company share package and more benefits. Vecchio said he immediately declined the offer and decided at that point to become involved in politics.

== Political career ==
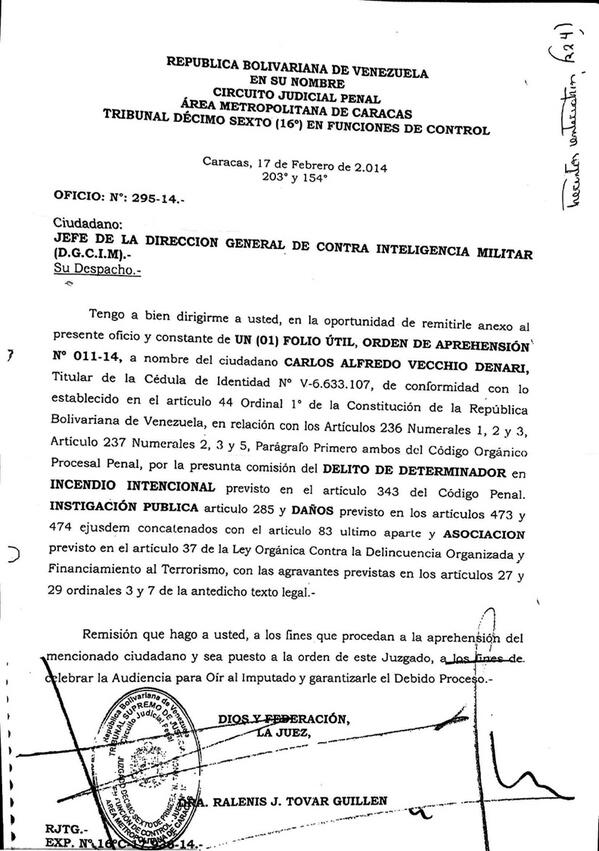
Carlos Vecchio's arrest warrant.

In 2006, Vecchio grew opposed to the economic policy of the Hugo Chávez administration and began to think about being involved in Venezuelan politics.

Vecchio later helped found the political party Popular Will (Spanish: Voluntad Popular) with Leopoldo López and Guaidó. With López imprisoned by the Venezuelan government, Vecchio was serving as leader of the party, when he was charged with incitement to violence. He went into hiding, and later sought exile in the US.

In January 2019, Vecchio was named by Juan Guaidó, and accepted by U.S. Secretary of State Mike Pompeo, as Chargé d'Affaires of the Government of Venezuela to the United States. He told the Washington Diplomat that the outgoing Maduro embassy staff had taken all valuables from the Washington Embassy as they left. “They dismantled everything, but we need to recover all of it legally because I want to have in the official record how we received those assets, to show the Venezuelan people what they did.”

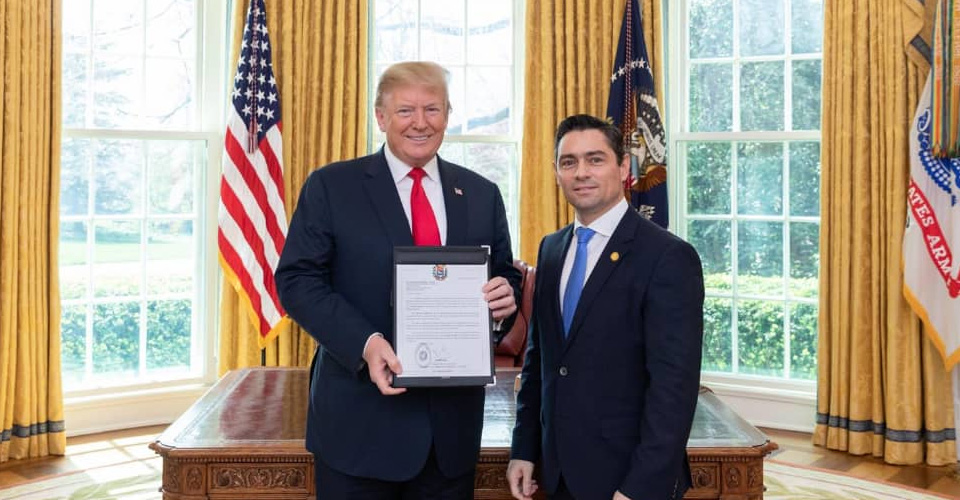
The US President Donald Trump accepted Credential Letter from Ambassador Carlos Vecchio

Michael Shifter told The Washington Diplomat that Vecchio is "extremely impressive and sharp ... He’s got the background, skills and temperament for the job ... he’s level-headed and realistic, and he’s been in this fight for a long time." The director of the Adrienne Arsht Latin America Center, Jason Marczak, said "he’s eloquent and articulate, and he’s able to maneuver in different circles", and that he will need to educate "folks like Bernie Sanders and others on the Hill who have started becoming critical of U.S. policy there."

== Recognition ==
Vecchio is a 2013 fellow of the Yale University Maurice R. Greenberg World Fellows Program.

== Publications ==
- Vecchio, Carlos with foreword by Luis Almagro and introduction by Leopoldo López (19 June 2018). Libres: El nacimiento de una nueva Venezuela (in Spanish). Círculo Editorial Visión Progresista / Editorial Dahbar / Cyngular Asesoría 357, C.A. ASIN B07DVTJCF6.
