= Juan Manuel Raffalli =

Venezuelan lawyer

Juan Manuel Raffalli Arismendi is a Venezuelan constitutional lawyer, law professor, and politician.

== Career ==
Raffalli graduated from Andrés Bello Catholic University (UCAB) in 1986, and received his law degree, focused on procedural law, from UCAB in 1989. He has been a law professor at three Venezuelan universities: UCAB (where he was also the head of the Law Department), Monteávila University, and the Institute for Superior Administrative Studies. He is a partner with the law firm of Raffalli de Lemos Halvorssen Ortega and Ortiz.

Raffalli founded the Constitutional Forum of Venezuela and was president of the Justice and Democracy Foundation. He served as a director for the Caracas Chamber of Industry and Commerce, and as a member of the legal committee for the Venezuelan–American chamber of commerce (VENAMCHAM).

He served in Venezuela's parliament as an alternate deputy to the National Assembly, and assisted the opposition Democratic Unity Roundtable (Spanish: Mesa de la Unidad Democrática, MUD) in dialogue with the government of Nicolás Maduro.
