= Juan Guaidó =

Venezuelan politician (born 1983)

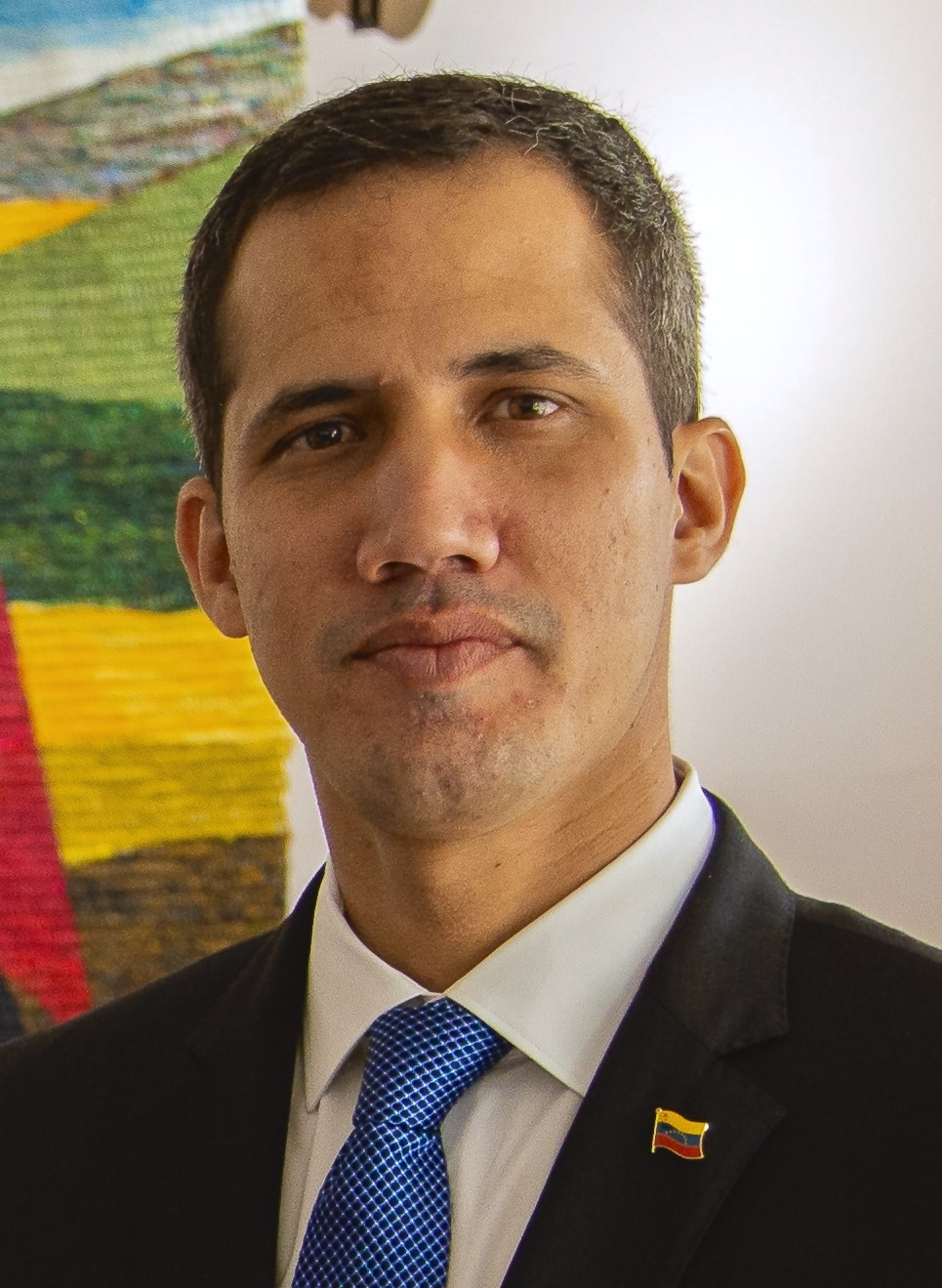
- Guaidó in 2020

Interim President of Venezuela
- In office 23 January 2019 – 5 January 2023; Disputed with Nicolás Maduro (Note: Following the 2018 Venezuelan presidential election, the National Electoral Council published results with Maduro winning, but was disputed by the Venezuelan opposition citing election irregularities. Following Maduro's second inauguration, the National Assembly declared Maduro a usurper of the presidency, and Juan Guaidó was sworn in as acting president a few days later.)
- Preceded by: Nicolás Maduro
- Succeeded by: Nicolás Maduro

10th President of the National Assembly of Venezuela
- In office 5 January 2019 – 5 January 2023
- Vice President: Edgar Zambrano; Juan Pablo Guanipa
- Preceded by: Omar Barboza
- Succeeded by: Dinorah Figuera

Majority Leader of the National Assembly of Venezuela
- In office 5 January 2018 – 5 January 2019
- Preceded by: Stalin González
- Succeeded by: Carlos Prosperi

Member of the National Assembly of Venezuela
- In office 5 January 2016 – 5 January 2021
- Constituency: Vargas

Personal details
- Born: Juan Gerardo Guaidó Márquez; 28 July 1983 (age 43) La Guaira, Venezuela
- Party: Independent (since 2020); Popular Will (2009–2020)
- Spouse: Fabiana Rosales (m. 2013)
- Children: 2
- Education: Andrés Bello Catholic University; George Washington University
- Profession: Engineer; politician

Juan Gerardo Antonio Guaidó Márquez (Note: Latin American Spanish pronunciation: [xwaŋ xeˈɾaɾðo ɣwajˈðo ˈmaɾkes].) (born 28 July 1983) is a Venezuelan politician and opposition figure. He belonged to the social-democratic party Popular Will, and was a federal deputy to the National Assembly representing the state of Vargas. He was a key figure in the Venezuelan presidential crisis between 2019 and 2023, when he was recognized by 88 countries, the European Parliament, Andean Parliament, Organization of American States etc. as the legitimate president of Venezuela vis-à-vis Nicolás Maduro by 49 countries.

Guaidó's political career began when he emerged as a student leader in the 2007 Venezuelan protests. He then helped found the Popular Will party with Leopoldo López in 2009, and was elected to be an alternate deputy in the National Assembly one year later in 2010. In 2015, Guaidó was elected as a full-seat deputy. Following a protocol to annually rotate the position of President of the National Assembly among political parties, Popular Will nominated Guaidó for the position in 2019.

On 23 January 2019, the National Assembly, which viewed the 2018 Venezuelan presidential election as illegitimate and refused to recognize the inauguration of Maduro to a second presidential term on 10 January, declared that he was acting president of Venezuela and Guaidó swore himself into office, starting the Venezuelan presidential crisis.

The Maduro administration froze Guaidó's Venezuelan assets, launched a probe accusing Guaidó of foreign interference, and threatened violence against him. Following a failed April 2019 uprising, representatives of Guaidó and Maduro began mediation. In January 2020, security forces prevented Guaidó and other congress members from entering the legislative palace during an internal election to choose the board of directors. A majority of lawmakers held an "emergency meeting" and voted to re-elect Guaidó as their leader, while the remaining lawmakers at the legislative palace elected Luis Parra. Security forces denied Guaidó and opposition lawmakers access to parliament many times since.

After the announcement of regional elections in 2021, Guaidó announced a "national salvation agreement" and proposed negotiation with Maduro with a schedule for free and fair elections, with international support and observers, in exchange for lifting international sanctions. Domestically, Guaidó's actions included a proposed Plan País (Country Plan), an amnesty law for military personnel and authorities who turn against the Maduro government, attempts to deliver humanitarian aid to the country, and social bonuses for health workers during COVID-19 pandemic.

Internationally, Guaidó gained control of some Venezuelan assets and property in the United States and United Kingdom, and appointed diplomats which had been recognized by supportive governments.

In December 2022, three of the four main opposition political parties approved to reorganize the interim government into a commission to manage foreign assets, as deputies sought a united strategy ahead of the 2024 Venezuelan presidential election. Dinorah Figuera was elected as Guaidó's successor on 5 January 2023, ending his presidential claim. In April 2023 he fled to the United States citing fears of his arrest.

On 6 October 2023, Maduro's regime alleged Guaidó to have committed money laundering, treason, and usurping public functions, issued an arrest warrant and asked the international community to cooperate with an arrest of Guaidó, requesting a red notice be issued by Interpol. Guaidó has denied the charges made by Maduro's regime.

== Early life and education ==
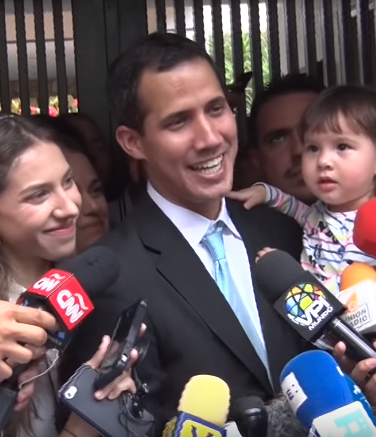
Juan Guaidó with his wife and his daughter after he denounced the presence of FAES forces outside his family home

Guaidó was born on 28 July 1983. Part of a large family, (Note: The Washington Post says Guaidó is one of eight siblings; Bloomberg says he is one of seven; The Wall Street Journal says he is one of six.) he was raised in a middle-class home in the outskirts of La Guaira; his parents are Wilmer and Norka. His father was an airline pilot (Note: The Washington Post says his father was an airline pilot; The Wall Street Journal says his father was a cab driver; La Patilla says his father, Wilmer Guaidó, escaped from Venezuela's chavismo and worked driving a taxi in Tenerife, Spain, but that he was an airline pilot in Venezuela.) and his mother, a teacher. One grandfather was a sergeant of the Venezuelan National Guard while another grandfather was a captain in the Venezuelan Navy. His parents divorced when he was at a young age, with his father emigrating to the Canary Islands and working as a taxi driver.

Guaidó lived through the 1999 Vargas tragedy, a series of mudslides in his home state, which killed some of his friends while also destroying his school and home, leaving him and his family homeless. The mudslide and its response, which he cites regularly in speeches, influenced his political views; colleagues say that the "feckless" response of the then-new government of Hugo Chávez is what drove him to activism.

He and his family stayed in a makeshift home in Caracas where he earned his high school diploma in 2000. Guaidó would continue to live in Caracas where he would earn his undergraduate degree in 2007 in industrial engineering from Andrés Bello Catholic University, working at Compu Mall, a Venezuelan chain of computer and electronics stores, to pay for his studies. He also participated in two postgraduate programs of public administration in Caracas: at the UCAB with the partnership of the George Washington University and at the Instituto de Estudios Superiores de Administración (IESA).

== Activism ==
Guaidó stated, after "it became clear that under Chávez the country was drifting toward totalitarianism," he was part of the student-led political movement that protested the Venezuelan government's decision to shut down the independent television network RCTV with other prominent student leaders in 2007—the year he graduated from Andrés Bello Catholic University. They also protested broader attempted government reforms by Chávez, including the 2007 constitutional referendum, which Chávez lost.

Along with Leopoldo López and other politicians, Guaidó was a founding member of the Popular Will political party in 2009; the party is affiliated with Socialist International.

By 2014, Guaidó was the party's national coordinator. López, one of Venezuela's main opposition politicians, "mentored Guaidó for years" according to a January 2019 CNN report, and the two spoke several times daily. As Lopez's protégé, Guaidó was well known in his party and the National Assembly, but not internationally; López named Guaidó to lead the Popular Will party in 2019.

== National Assembly ==
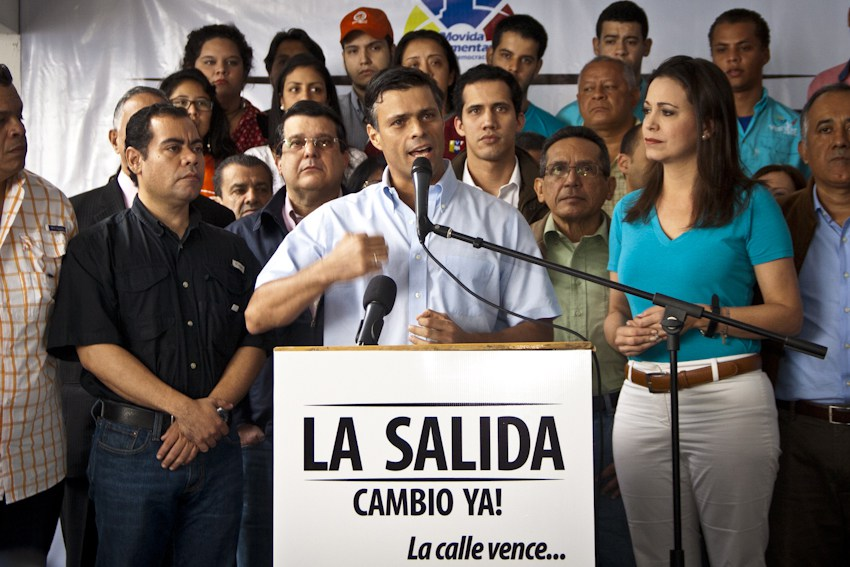
Guaidó behind Leopoldo López and María Corina Machado, presenting the protests initiative La Salida (The Exit) in 2014

In the 2010 Venezuelan parliamentary election, Guaidó was elected as an alternate national deputy. He was one of several politicians who went on a hunger strike to demand parliamentary elections in 2015 and was elected to a full-seat in the National Assembly in the 2015 elections with 26% of the vote. Vargas, an impoverished area, was home to many state-run companies that employed the majority of the population; until Guaidó's 2015 election, chavista candidates had run unchallenged.

In 2017, he was named head of the Comptroller's Commission of the National Assembly and in 2018, he was named head of the legislature's opposition. He contributed to research at the University of Arizona, giving testimony to analysts on the working conditions of Latin American politicians and, specifically, institutional crisis and political change.

In the National Assembly, Guaidó investigated corruption cases involving the Maduro administration, and worked with independent organizations to recover money allegedly stolen from the Venezuelan public. He participated in the 2017 Venezuelan protests, where one time security forces fractured his arm and he was shot with rubber bullets, which he has stated left scars on his neck. In January 2018 he was sworn in as the Leader of the Majority in the National Assembly.

=== President of the National Assembly ===
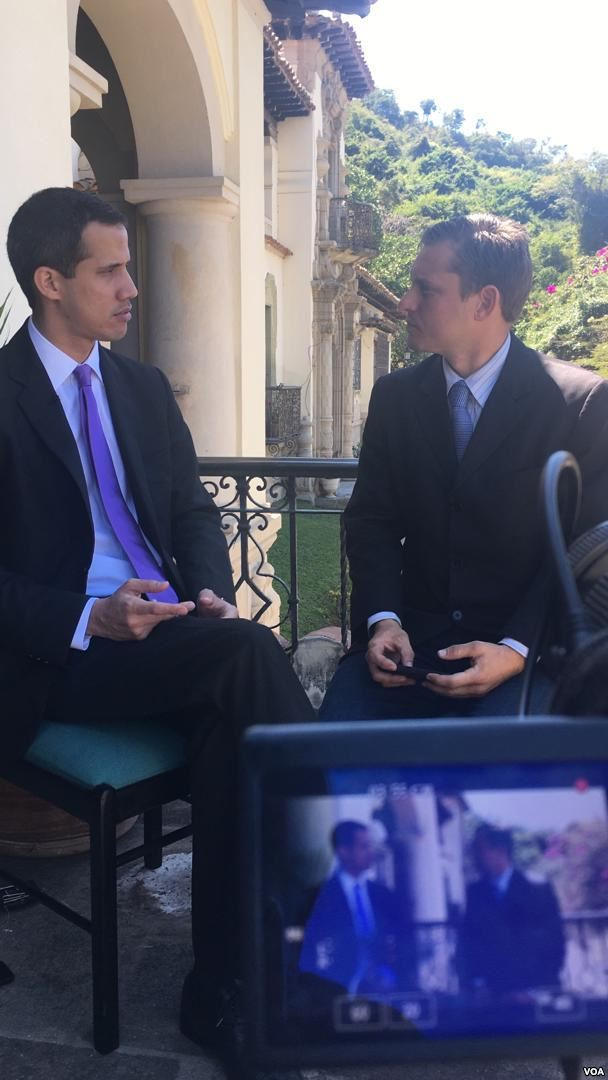
Guaidó in a 1 February 2019 Voice of America interview

A rotating presidency of the National Assembly of Venezuela agreement resulted with Popular Will attaining leadership and due to the party's head officials being imprisoned or exiled, Guaidó was chosen as president in December 2018 by the Assembly, (Note: In 2018, it was the Popular Will Party's turn to hold the leadership in a position that is rotated among the opposition coalition.) and was sworn in on 5 January 2019. Relatives of imprisoned politicians were invited to the inauguration. At 35, Guaidó was the youngest to have led the opposition. Shortly after assuming the presidency of the legislature, Guaidó began advocating for a law to form a transitional government.

Two politicians were primarily responsible for the strategy that brought Guaidó to prominence: Julio Borges (in exile) and Leopoldo López (under house arrest). The plan was developed after the failed 2017 negotiations during the Venezuelan crisis between representatives of chavismo and the opposition, and that took more than a year to develop. Ricardo Hausmann and politicians from different political parties were also involved. Borges was involved in external efforts, such as with the Lima Group, along with Antonio Ledezma and Carlos Vecchio, who operated in the United States; María Corina Machado and López operated in Venezuela. David Smolansky and Freddy Guevara also supported Guaidó, along with Henrique Capriles, who had initially been distant. Javier Corrales, professor and author, (Note: Professor of Political Science at Amherst College, author, and journal editor.) stated that Guaidó's rise as a presidential figure began within Venezuela, not by foreign pressure. López and Guaidó contacted the United States Department of State, presenting a plan to declare Guaidó interim president and that the United States could lead other nations to support his recognition in order to remove Maduro; United States Secretary of State Mike Pompeo supported the plan. López and Guaidó promoted this initiative to the United States without the knowledge of the National Assembly, according to Neuman.

Upon taking office, Guaidó vowed to oppose Maduro, and elaborated an action plan. The plan, approved by the National Assembly, comprised three phases (end of usurpation, transitional government, and free elections), with eight key points.

=== Detention and release ===
While on his way to a 13 January 2019 public assembly, Guaidó was briefly detained by members of the Bolivarian Intelligence Service (SEBIN), and released 45 minutes later. The Lima Group and the Secretary General of the Organization of American States (OAS), Luis Almagro, condemned the act. The Maduro government said the detention was carried out unilaterally by the SEBIN personnel, and twelve SEBIN officials were charged for their actions.

Guaidó declared that the events demonstrated that there was a break in the chain of command in the Armed Forces, and that Maduro was not in control.

=== Re-election ===
The 2020 Venezuelan National Assembly Delegated Committee election of 5 January, to elect the Board of Directors of the National Assembly, was disrupted; there were two claims for the presidency of the National Assembly, by Guaidó and Luis Parra, an independent legislator. Parra was formerly a member of Justice First, but was expelled from the party on 20 December 2019 based on corruption allegations, which he denied. Parra declared himself president of the National Assembly – a move that was welcomed by the Maduro administration. The opposition disputed this outcome, saying that quorum had not been achieved and no votes had been counted. Police forces had blocked access to parliament to some opposition members, including Guaidó, and members of the media. Later in the day, a separate session was carried out at the headquarters of El Nacional newspaper, where 100 of the 167 deputies voted to re-elect Guaidó as president of the parliament. In his speech, Guaidó announced his resignation from Popular Will.

Guaidó was sworn in on 7 January after forcing his way in through police barricades. On the same day, Parra reiterated his claim to the presidency of the parliament.

== Claim to presidency ==
=== Swearing-in ===
After what he and critics of the Maduro administration described as the "illegitimate" inauguration of Maduro on 10 January 2019, Guaidó challenged Maduro's claim to the presidency. The National Assembly declared Guaidó was willing to assume the responsibilities of the presidency. They called for demonstrations on 23 January, the 61st anniversary of the overthrow of dictator Marcos Pérez Jiménez. Prior to Guaidó's declaration, Vice President of the United States Mike Pence called Guaidó on 22 January and told him that the United States would support his initiative.

On 23 January, Guaidó declared he assumed the functions as acting president and took the presidential oath at a rally in Caracas. Within minutes of Guaidó's swearing-in, the United States recognized him as president, followed shortly thereafter by Canada and other Latin American and European countries; Russia, China, Iran, Syria, Cuba and Turkey supported Maduro. Maduro accused the United States of backing a coup and said he would cut ties with the country. Guaidó denied the coup allegations, saying peaceful volunteers backed his movement. In December 2018, Guaidó had traveled to Washington, D.C., where he met with OAS Secretary General Luis Almagro, and then on 14 January to Colombia for a Lima Group meeting, in which Maduro's mandate was rejected. The fragmented opposition later unified around Guaidó.

Spanish newspaper El País described U.S. president Donald Trump's election—coinciding with the election of conservative presidents in Colombia and Brazil, along with deteriorating conditions in Venezuela—as "a perfect storm," influenced by hawks in the Trump administration. Opposition members Carlos Vecchio, Julio Borges and Gustavo Tarre were consulted, and the Trump administration decision to back Guaidó formed on 22 January, according to El Pais. U.S. Secretary of State Mike Pompeo, National Security Adviser John R. Bolton, Treasury Secretary Steven Mnuchin and others met with Trump that day, and Vice President Mike Pence called Guaidó that night to express U.S. support, according to The Wall Street Journal. According to El País, the January Lima Group meeting and the stance taken by Canada, represented by Chrystia Freeland, were key factors leading Donald Trump, known for being an isolationist, to become involved in Venezuela.

The Supreme Tribunal of Justice (TSJ) rejected the National Assembly's decisions, while the Supreme Tribunal of Justice of Venezuela in exile welcomed Guaidó as acting president.

On 29 January 2019, the TSJ launched a probe of Guaidó, froze his assets, and prohibited him from leaving the country. According to Special Rapporteur on the Independence of Judges and Lawyers for the United Nations Diego García Sayán, the measures were "not adopted in accordance with constitutional requirements, normal legal procedures and international human rights standards."

As of 1 April 2021, Guaidó was no longer recognized as Venezuela's rightful President by the European Union's 27 member-states after he lost his position as head of parliament. Although the United States and the United Kingdom continued to recognize him as the legitimate leader of Venezuela in 2021, the United States stopped recognizing Guaidó in January 2023 when the opposition party vote to dissolve Guaidó's interim government took effect.

=== Personnel ===
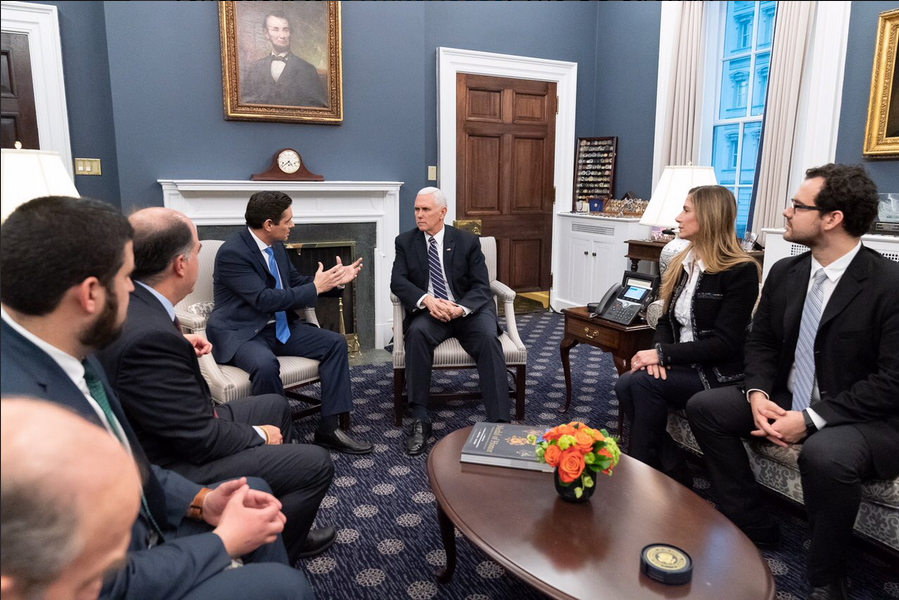
Mike Pence meets with Carlos Vecchio, Julio Borges, and other Washington-based Venezuelan representatives on 29 January 2019

According to El País, Guaidó had help, along with National Assembly vice-presidents Stalin González and Edgar Zambrano, from young representatives of several political parties: Miguel Pizarro for humanitarian aid, Carlos Paparoni heading a Finance Commission, and Marialbert Barrios working with embassies. Delsa Solórzano worked with Luisa Ortega Díaz on the Amnesty Law. David Smolansky was the OAS coordinator for the Venezuelan Migrant and Refugee crisis.

Carlos Vecchio was accepted by Pompeo as the Guaidó administration's diplomatic envoy to the US. Julio Borges was named to represent Venezuela in the Lima Group. The National Assembly made more than a dozen other diplomatic appointments, including Elisa Trotta Gamus to Argentina, María Teresa Belandria to Brazil, and Humberto Calderón Berti to Colombia. Diplomats to Europe and the Dominican Republic were named on 19 February.

Gustavo Tarre Briceño was named Venezuela's Permanent Representative to the Organization of American States (OAS) on 29 January 2019, and ratified by the National Assembly according to the constitution. On 9 April, the OAS voted 18 to 9, with six abstentions, to accept Tarre Briceño as the ambassador from Venezuela. Maduro's Foreign Ministry called Tarre a "political usurper." The nomination was accepted 20 days before the deadline on Venezuela leaving the union, after they triggered the process in 2017, suggesting that the nation will remain in the OAS against the wishes of the Maduro administration. Venezuela's previous ambassador voted against Tarre. According to The Washington Post, the OAS vote undermined Maduro's presence internationally and marked a step in the official recognition of Guaidó's government.

The National Assembly authorized Guaidó's appointment of a new ad hoc directors board of Petróleos de Venezuela (PDVSA), of Citgo, Pdvsa Holding Inc, Citgo Holding Inc. and Citgo Petroleum Corporation. The appointed members of PDVSA were Simón Antúnez, Gustavo J. Velasquez, Carlos José Balza, Ricardo Prada and David Smolansky. Likewise, the appointed members of Citgo Holding and Citgo Petroleum Corporation were Luisa Palacios, Edgar Rincón, Luis Urdaneta, Ángel Olmeta, Andrés Padilla and Rick Esser. With Citgo under the control of Guaidó's administration, the US Department of Treasury extended its license to operate in spite of US sanctions.

Guaidó named José Ignacio Hernández as special solicitor, making Hernández the first official named with state power. Ricardo Hausmann was named as Venezuela's representative to the Inter-American Development Bank, who recognized Hausmann as a replacement for Maduro's representative.

The Maduro administration's prosecutor general, Tarek William Saab, said the "appointments by Guaidó and his National Assembly are part of an illegal power grab backed by foreign governments" and opened a probe into the ambassador and oil industry appointees; a magistrate of "Venezuela's pro-Maduro Supreme Court later read a statement ... nullifying the appointments and accusing the National Assembly of overstepping its constitutional powers."

=== Arrest attempt ===
On 12 July 2021, Special Action Forces (FAES) officials went to Guaidó's residence and besieged him for twenty minutes in the building's garage, and used explosives against him as Guaidó took refuge in an armored vehicle. The intended arrest was foiled due to the vehicle and his neighbors and supporters, who opposed Guaidó's detention. Guaidó said that the officers did not identify themselves nor did they show any judicial order. On the same day, former deputy Freddy Guevara was detained while he was driving his vehicle.

=== Interim government dismissal ===
After a preliminary vote on 22 December 2022 to remove the interim government, on 30 December 2022, three of the four main political parties (Justice First, Democratic Action and A New Era) backed a reform of the Statute Governing the Transition to Democracy to dissolve the interim government and create a commission of five members to manage foreign assets, stating that the interim government had failed to achieve the goals it had set. The amendment was voted by the opposition National Assembly as deputies sought a united strategy ahead of the presidential elections scheduled for 2024. The reform was approved with 72 votes in favor, 29 against and 8 abstentions.

== Domestic affairs ==
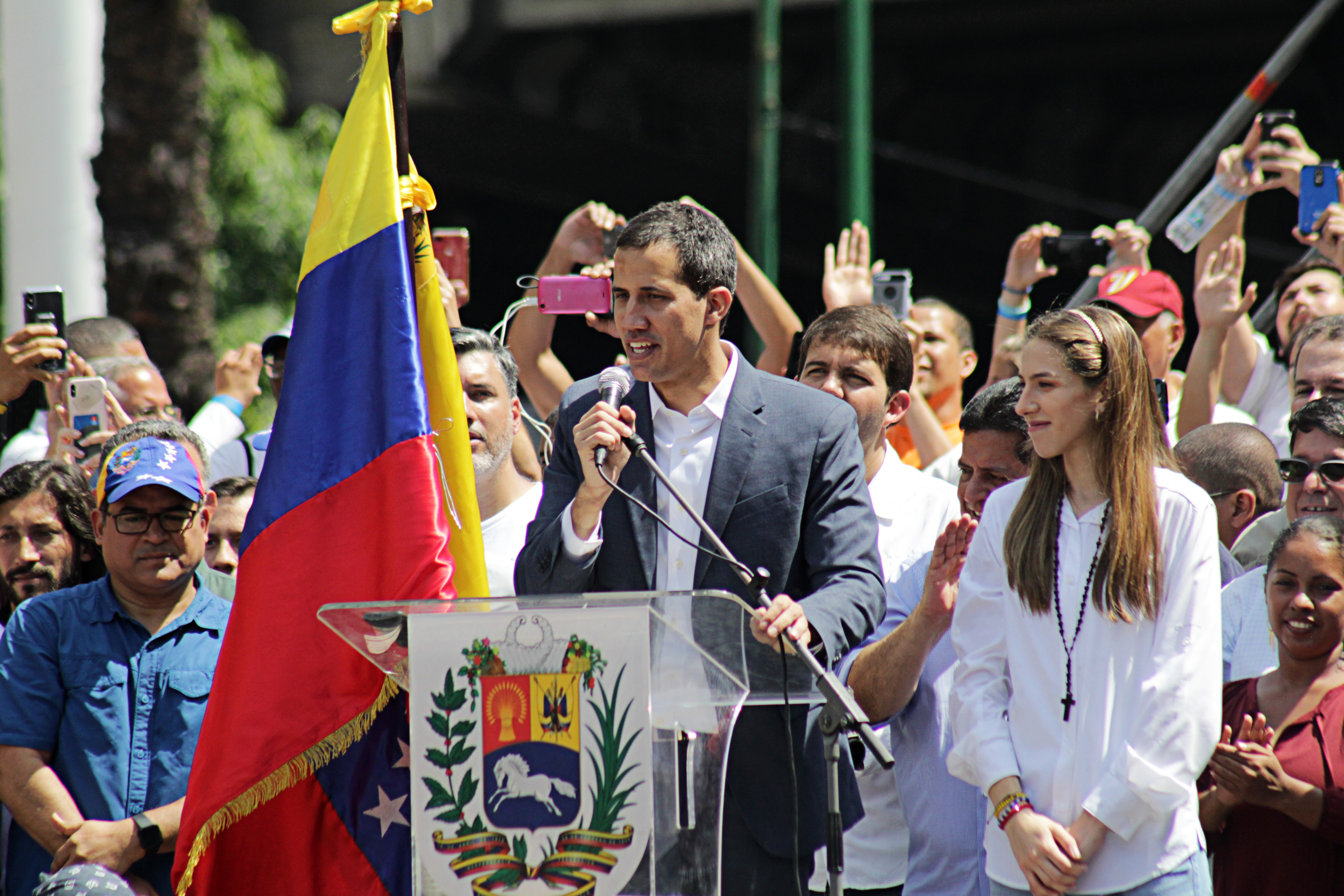
Guaidó and wife, Fabiana Rosales at a 2 February demonstration

In a 30 January 2019 New York Times editorial, Guaidó stated that Venezuela had "one of the highest homicide rates in the world", prompting the "largest exodus in Latin American history" and that "Under Mr. Maduro at least 240 Venezuelans have been murdered at marches, and there are 600 political prisoners." His response to these problems was three-fold: restore the democratic National Assembly, gain international support, and allow for the people's right to self-determination.

=== Amnesty law ===
On 25 January 2019, Guaidó offered the Amnesty Law (Spanish: Ley de Amnistía a nombre de la Asamblea Nacional de Venezuela) approved by the National Assembly, for military personnel and authorities who help unseat Maduro. He suggested that if Maduro gave up power, he may receive amnesty. He held a public assembly, asking supporters to disseminate the Amnesty Law throughout the country to military, police and other functionaries. On 30 January, demonstrators took to the streets across the country to encourage the military to allow humanitarian aid and reject Maduro. Maduro also held meetings with the military; top military command remained loyal to Maduro as of February 2019.

In a 30 January editorial published by The New York Times, Guaidó explained that the law would only apply to individuals who were not found to have committed crimes against humanity.

According to Colombian immigration authorities, as of 24 April 2019, about 1,400 Venezuelan military personnel had broken ranks and crossed the border into Colombia since the border clashes began on 23 February, in addition to 60 that crossed into Brazil, according to the Brazilian Army.

=== Elections ===
Guaidó told CNN in February 2019 that he would call elections 30 days after Maduro left power. He did not state if he would run for president when elections occur, but said discussing running for president was "premature".

The Statute Governing the Transition to Democracy to Re-establish the Validity of the Constitution of the Bolivarian Republic of Venezuela (Spanish: Estatuto que Rige la Transición a la Democracia para Restablecer la Vigencia de la Constitución de la República Bolivariana De Venezuela) was approved on 5 February, and the National Assembly second vice-president Stalin González announced that a commission to set a route towards elections was established on 6 March 2019.

=== Finance and economy ===
Guaidó asked the Bank of England and British Prime Minister Theresa May not to return to the Maduro administration the £1.2 billion in gold reserves the UK holds for Venezuela, and to allow the opposition to access it instead. In the same week, the US Treasury levied sanctions against PDVSA and transferred control of some Venezuelan assets to Guaidó.

Guaidó said the Maduro administration was attempting to move some of the country's assets to Uruguay, "to keep stealing from the people of Venezuela." On 5 February, Paparoni announced that the transfer from Portugal to Uruguay had been stopped.

Guaidó sought to open up the economy by allowing foreign, private oil companies greater participation in ventures with PDVSA by dropping the requirement for 51% PDVSA ownership in joint ventures. Pledging to honor "legal" and "financial" debt, Carlos Vecchio said that agreements in which Venezuela pays debt with oil (signed by the Maduro administration) might not be honored.

=== Humanitarian aid ===
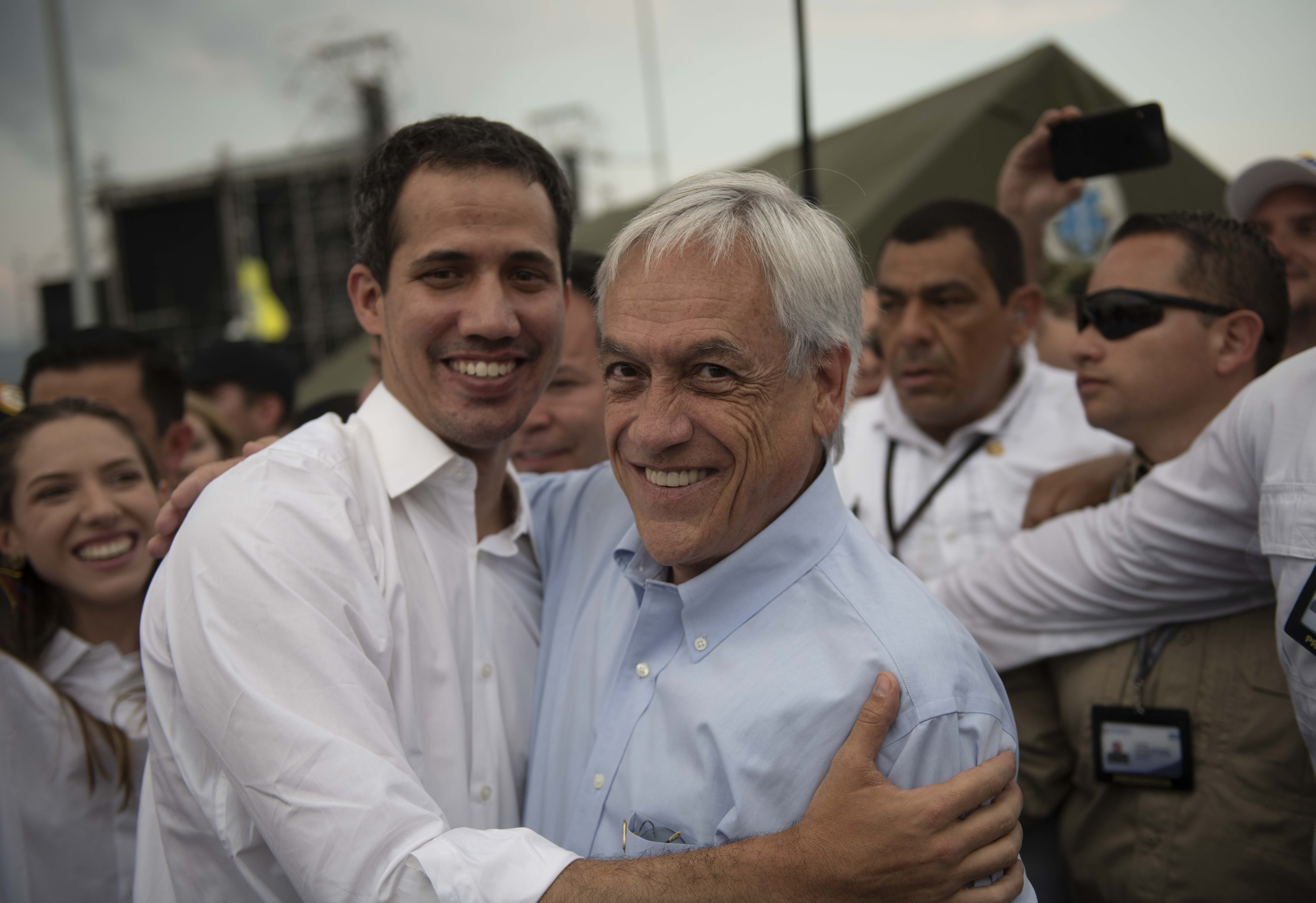
Guaidó and Sebastián Piñera, on 22 February 2019 at Venezuela Aid Live

In a Euronews interview, Guaidó said that hospitals in Venezuela lacked basic supplies and that "children were dying due to malnutrition." He made bringing humanitarian aid to Venezuelans who could die if aid does not arrive a priority, and a test of the military's allegiance. The day after assuming the acting presidency, Guaidó requested humanitarian aid for Venezuela from the US and from the United Nations. He said Venezuela's neighbors, in a "global coalition to send aid to Venezuela", would help get humanitarian aid and medicine into the country; products would be shipped to neighboring ports and brought overland via convoys. He said that the 250,000 people whose lives were in danger would be the recipients of the first phase of the effort. He traveled to Cúcuta on 22 February to be present as the aid entered Colombia; Maduro administration security forces clashed with demonstrators and blocked the aid from entering.

The International Federation of Red Cross and Red Crescent Societies announced in March 2019 that the Red Cross was preparing to bring humanitarian aid to the country in April to help ease both the chronic hunger and the medical crisis. The Wall Street Journal said that the acceptance of humanitarian shipments by Maduro was his first acknowledgement that Venezuela is "suffering from an economic collapse." Guaidó said the acceptance of humanitarian aid was the "result of our pressure and insistence", and called on Venezuelans to "stay vigilant to make sure incoming aid is not diverted for 'corrupt' purposes". Following the joint report from Human Rights Watch and Johns Hopkins in April 2019, increasing announcements from the United Nations about the scale of the humanitarian crisis, and the softening of Maduro's position on receiving aid, the Red Cross tripled its budget for aid to Venezuela.

=== Media ===
On 23 April 2019, Guaidó named Alberto Federico Ravell, former CEO and co-founder of the news channel Globovisión, as his spokesman and director of the National Center of Communications of Venezuela, Guaidó's information and media board. In January 2020, Guaidó announced the appointment of an ad hoc directors board of the National Commission of Telecommunications (CONATEL), saying that "Telesur will no longer be a propaganda tool of the regime."

=== Plan País ===
Guaidó announced on 31 January at the Central University of Venezuela that the National Assembly had approved a commission to implement a plan for the reconstruction of Venezuela. Called Plan País (Plan for the Country), it had been under elaboration for some time, and was initially developed through a series of public and private meetings in the US and Venezuela. According to Guaidó, the aims of the plan were to "stabilize the economy, attend to the humanitarian emergency immediately, rescue public services, and overcome poverty." It had provisions to revitalize PDVSA, restore the health sector, and offer assistance to the most poverty-stricken. Implementation of the plan required Maduro's exit.

=== Plans to oust Maduro ===
==== Operation Freedom ====
Guaidó announced he would embark on a tour of the country beginning 16 March to organize committees for Operación Libertad (trans. Operation Freedom or Operation Liberty) with the goal to claim the presidential residence, Miraflores Palace. As part of the ongoing tour, he visited Petare, regarded as one of the world's largest slums, on 12 April.

In an open assembly celebrating the anniversary of the 19 April 1810 date when the Venezuelan Independence Movement began, Guaidó offered the example that organized protests in Sudan led to the replacement of Omar al-Bashir, and called for "the greatest march" in history on 1 May, to "once and for all end this tragedy". Coinciding with his speech, NetBlocks stated that state-run CANTV again blocked access to social media in Venezuela.

On 30 April, Guaidó live-streamed a video of himself beside opposition leader Leopoldo López, freed from house arrest after being imprisoned for five years, with the two flanked by members of the Venezuelan armed forces, announcing the "final phase" of Operation Freedom. He stated: "People of Venezuela, it is necessary that we go out together to the street, to support the democratic forces and to recover our freedom. Organized and together, mobilize the main military units. People of Caracas, all to La Carlota." The Associated Press reported that López "had been released from house arrest by security forces adhering to an order from Guaidó." Several dozen military personnel and civilians joined Guaidó in his call for an uprising.

The head of the Bolivarian Intelligence Service, Manuel Cristopher Figuera, denounced the Maduro government and was dismissed from his position before going into hiding. Expected military defections did not happen. By the end of the day, one protester had died and at least 100 were injured; López was at the Spanish embassy, while 25 military personnel sought asylum in the Brazilian embassy in Caracas. On 1 May, Guaidó's call for the largest march in history did not materialize and his supporters were forced to retreat by security forces using tear gas. Guaidó acknowledged he had received insufficient military backing, and called for strikes beginning on 2 May, with the aim of a general strike later in May.

Guaidó's support began to drop following the incident. In the Miami Herald, Jim Wyss wrote that the "failed military uprising and a spate of violent but fruitless demonstrations have some wondering if Guaido, and the opposition at large, have what it takes to oust Maduro."

==== Strategic Committee ====
According to a report by The Washington Post, in August 2019 Guaidó tasked J.J. Rendón and a committee to investigate scenarios for achieving the removal of Maduro. Members of the Strategic Committee argued that the Venezuelan Constitution, the United Nations Convention against Transnational Organized Crime, and other treaties justified action against Maduro.

Rendón stated that the Strategic Committee had contacted numerous groups about removing Maduro from office, but they demanded payments up to US$500 million. He then made contact with Jordan Goudreau, owner of Silvercorp USA, where Goudreau presented an offer for the capture or extraction of Maduro from Venezuela for US$212.9 million. Rendón signed an agreement in Washington, D.C., on behalf of the Guaidó government with Silvercorp on 16 October 2019. An amount of US$1.5 million was later demanded by Goudreau to initiate "Operation Resolution". Guaidó representatives ultimately removed themselves from Goudreau's proposal. Goudreau was later responsible for the foiled 3–4 May 2020 Venezuelan Operation Gideon.

Following the raid, Guaido's team initially said they had "no relationship with any company in the security and defense branch"; Rendón later admitted that an "exploratory agreement" with Silvercorp had been signed to seek the capture of members of Maduro's government.

When interviewed by BBC Mundo, risk consultant Dimitris Pantoulas, and head of the Datanálisis consultant firm Luis Vicente León agreed that Guaidó's reputation was damaged due to the incident, with León stating "the opposition seems to have exhausted the routes". In an analysis for the Council on Hemispheric Affairs, Patricio Zamorano wrote that the event demonstrated that "Guaidó is politically immature and inept", that such scandals had "led to a significant withering of his support" and that Guaidó was willing to resort to violence to remove Maduro from power.

=== Dialogue with Maduro ===
In response to calls from Mexico, Uruguay, and CARICOM for negotiations, Guaidó said that the National Assembly would not participate in dialogue with Maduro, on the grounds that negotiations had already been attempted, "within and outside of Venezuela, in private and in public, alone and with international companions." Guaidó said that the result of all previous negotiations was more repression, with Maduro taking advantage of the process to strengthen his position. Offering as examples Leopoldo López, the detention of Juan Requesens, Julio Borges (in exile) and others, he said that if Maduro really wanted dialogue, he would release political prisoners. He asked Uruguay and Mexico to join him. Guaidó characterized Uruguay as failing to defend democracy, saying that Uruguay's stance was surprising given Venezuela has 300,000 starving people at risk of dying.

After Maduro wrote to Pope Francis, asking for assistance with negotiations, Guaidó refused the Vatican's offer to mediate, calling the attempt a "false dialogue," and saying that by mediating, the Vatican would assist those who "refused to see the Venezuelan reality." Guaidó said that Maduro did not respect conditions of 2016 negotiations, and suggested the Pope should encourage Maduro to allow an orderly transition of power. Corriere della Sera cited a 7 February 2019 reply from Pope Francis addressed to "Mr. Maduro," in which Pope Francis also stated that what had been agreed in earlier negotiations (open a channel for humanitarian aid, hold free elections, free political prisoners, and re-establish the constitutionally-elected National Assembly) had not been followed, and that he would back only constructive dialogue "when all conflicting parties put the common good above any other interest."

Following the failed uprising, representatives of Guaidó and Maduro began mediation, with the assistance of the Norwegian Centre for Conflict Resolution. Jorge Rodríguez and Héctor Rodríguez Castro served as representatives for Maduro while Gerardo Blyde and Stalin González were representatives for Guaidó. Guaidó confirmed that there was an envoy in Norway, but said that the opposition would not take part in false negotiations. After the second meeting in Norway, no deal was reached.

On 9 July 2019 negotiations started in Barbados with representatives of Maduro and Guaidó. Several theories arose from the negotiations, including potential elections agreed upon between the government and the opposition, having Héctor Rodríguez as the main government candidate. On 15 September, Guaidó announced that the opposition concluded the dialogue after the absence of the government in the negotiations for forty days as a protest to the recent sanctions by the United States.

In February 2020, the coordinator of the Lima Group, Hugo de Zela, announced that Argentina, Canada and Peru were attempting to negotiate with the Cuban government to find a solution to the crisis.

In late March 2020, the United States relaxed its position and proposed a transitional government that would exclude both Maduro and Guaidó from the presidency. Secretary of State Mike Pompeo said that sanctions did not apply to humanitarian aid during the coronavirus pandemic health emergency and that the United States would lift all sanctions if Maduro agreed to organize elections that did not include himself in a period of six to twelve months. The deal would enforce a power-sharing scenario between the different government factions. Elections would have to be held within the year, and all foreign militaries would have to leave the country. The US was still seeking Maduro's arrest at the time of the announcement. Other aspects of the US deal would include releasing all political prisoners and setting up a five-person council to lead the country; two members each chosen by Maduro and Guaidó would sit on the council, with the last member selected by the four. The EU also agreed to remove sanctions if the deal went ahead.

Guaidó accepted the proposal, while Venezuela's foreign minister, Jorge Arreaza, rejected it and declared that only parliamentary elections would take place that year.

Reuters reported that during the COVID-19 pandemic, allies of both Maduro and Guaidó had secretly begun exploratory talks, according to sources on both sides. Guaidó and U.S. Special Representative for Venezuela Elliott Abrams denied that negotiations had taken place.

After the announcement of regional elections in 2021, Guaidó announced a "national salvation agreement" and proposed the negotiation with Maduro with a schedule for free and fair elections, with international support and observers, in exchange for lifting international sanctions.

On 5 August 2021, Mexican President Andrés Manuel López Obrador announced that Mexico would host negotiations talks between Maduro and the opposition, including Guaidó, who stated that he would push for guarantees for what he called free and fair elections.

== Foreign affairs ==
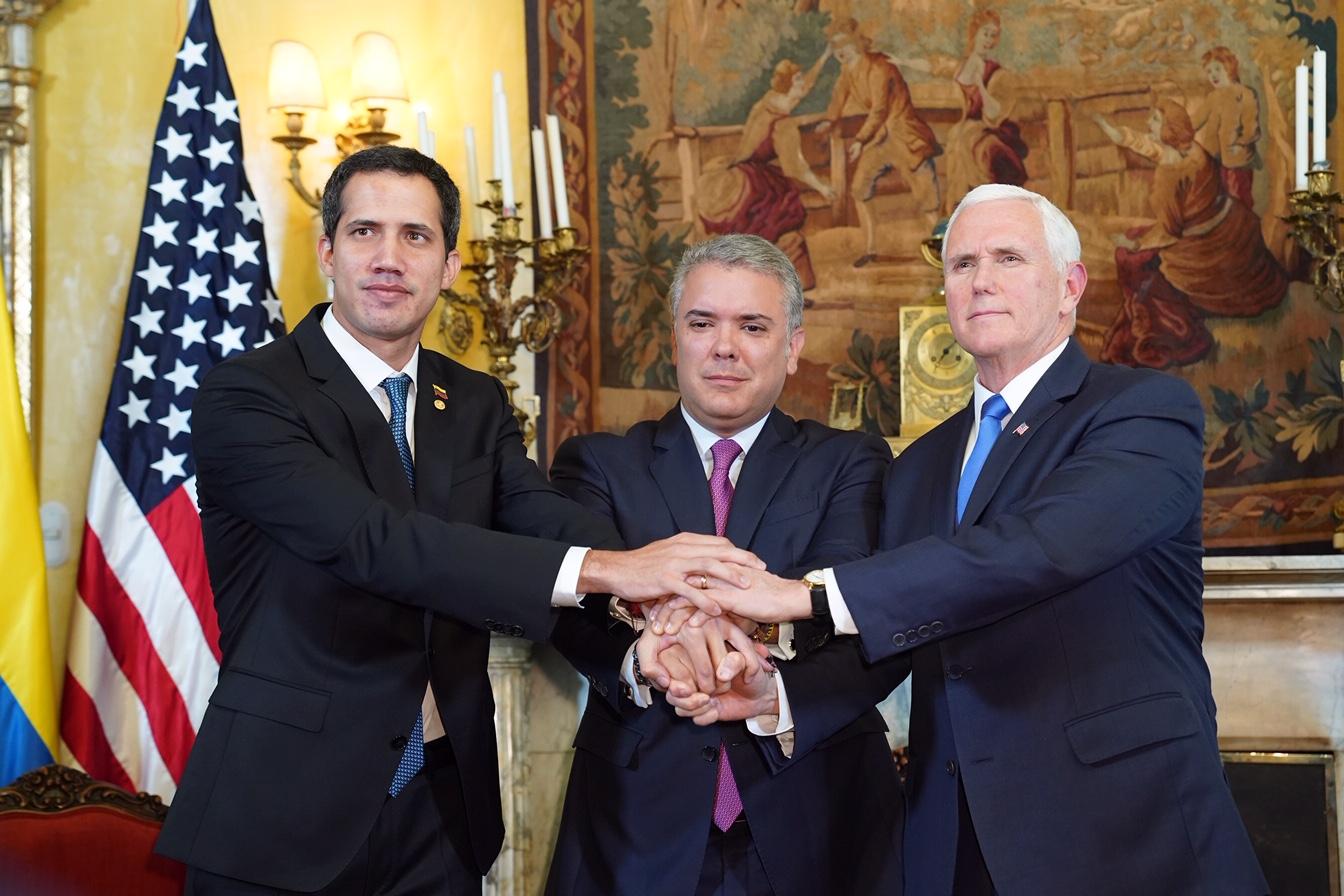
Juan Guaidó with Colombian president Ivan Duque and U.S. Vice President Mike Pence in February 2019

Guaidó said there was room for long-term Chávez/Maduro allies such as Russia and China in Venezuela, adding that legal security under a new plan for the country would benefit all businesses, including theirs. He approached China to establish diplomatic ties, stating "China's support will be very important in boosting our country's economy and future development." According to Euronews, he said he had been "working to convince China and Russia that it was in their economic interest to withdraw support from Maduro." Bloomberg published a 14 April editorial from Guaidó, "Why China should switch sides in Venezuela," in which Guaidó appealed to China and stated that it is in China's interest to support a peaceful transition, rule of law, and economic reconstruction in Venezuela.

According to CNN, following a long history of Fidel Castro's interest in the country, "Venezuelan oil is the lifeblood of Cuban economy, under a barter system where Cuba receives billions of dollars of crude in exchange for Cuban doctors, teachers, sports trainers, and military and intelligence advisers." Guaidó vowed that Cuban influence in Venezuela would end. Referring to Cubans as "brothers," he said that Cuban individuals are welcome to stay in the country, but not in decision-making positions, and not in the armed forces. On 12 March 2019, the National Assembly voted to cut Venezuela's oil supply to Cuba, which would save about US$2.6 million daily, according to Guaidó, who asked other nations to help implement the measure.

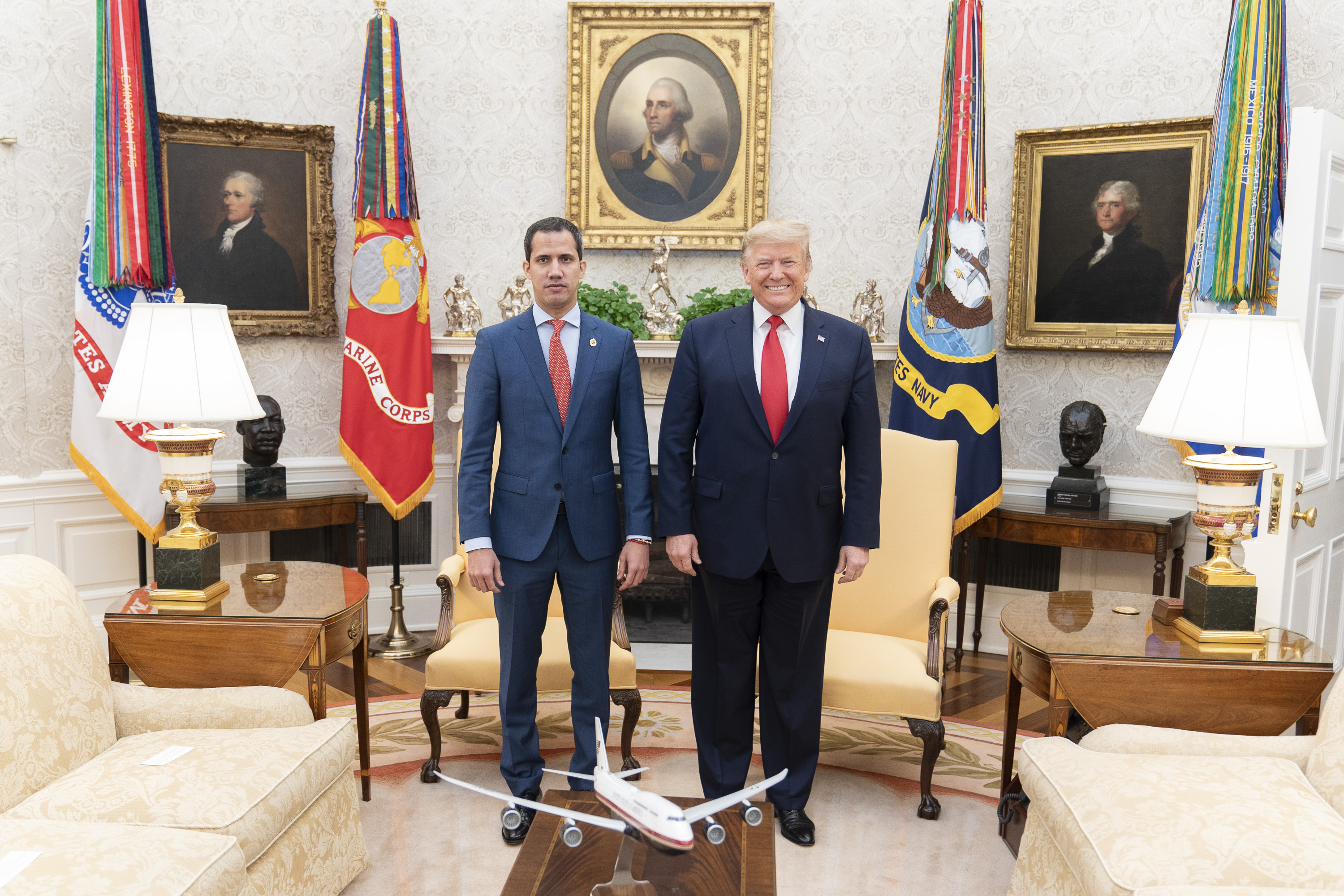
Guaidó with U.S. President Donald Trump in Washington, D.C., February 2020

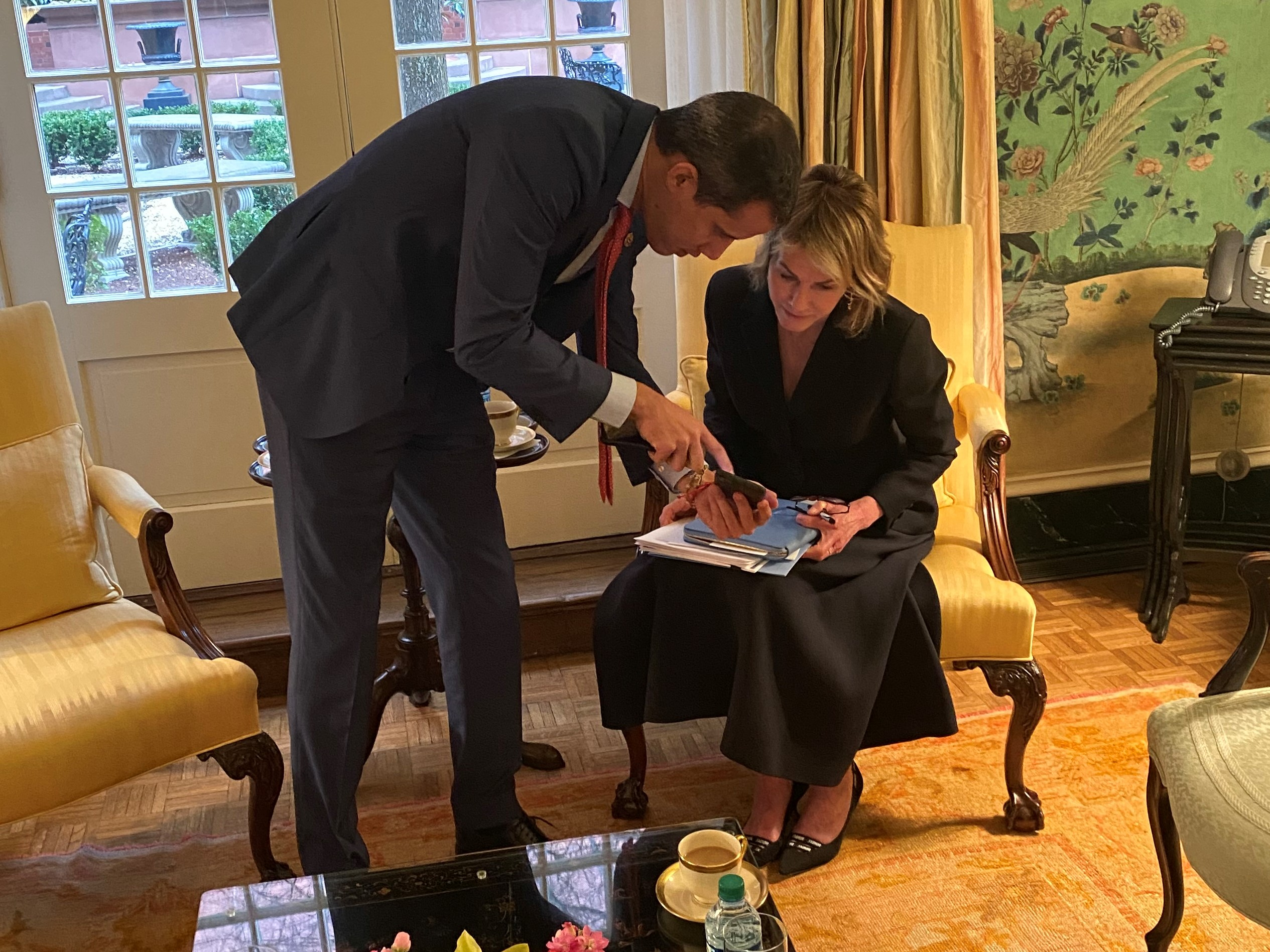
Guaidó with U.S. Ambassador to the United Nations Kelly Craft, February 2020

Guaidó sought restored relations with Israel; Chávez had severed relations with Israel more than ten years prior, favoring support for Palestine during Operation Cast Lead.

Guaidó has supported Venezuela's sovereignty claim in the Guyana–Venezuela territorial dispute throughout his political career.

In June 2019, the United Nations reported that four million Venezuelans had left the country, many without a valid passport. Associated Press has reported that getting an extension is an expensive and lengthy ordeal for many Venezuelans. The National Assembly decided accordingly to release a decree, signed by Guaidó, to extend Venezuelan passports' lifespan. The decision was accepted by the United States and Canada, which recognized the validity of the Venezuelan passports for five years beyond the printed expiration date.

In September 2019, Guaidó announced the designation as terrorist organizations of Revolutionary Armed Forces of Colombia (FARC), National Liberation Army (ELN), Hamas, Hezbollah, and the Islamic State of Iraq and the Levant (ISIS/ISIL), ordering all state security forces to protect "our sovereignty and territorial integrity" against the threat posed by these groups. Following an American airstrike that killed Iranian Quds Force Commander Qasem Soleimani in January 2020, Guaidó said that Soleimani "led a criminal and terrorist structure in Iran that for years caused pain to his people and destabilized the Middle East, just as Abu Mahdi al-Muhandis did with Hezbollah." Guaidó also accused Nicolás Maduro of allowing him and his Quds Forces to incorporate their sanctioned banks and their companies in Venezuela.

=== International trips ===
==== 2019 ====
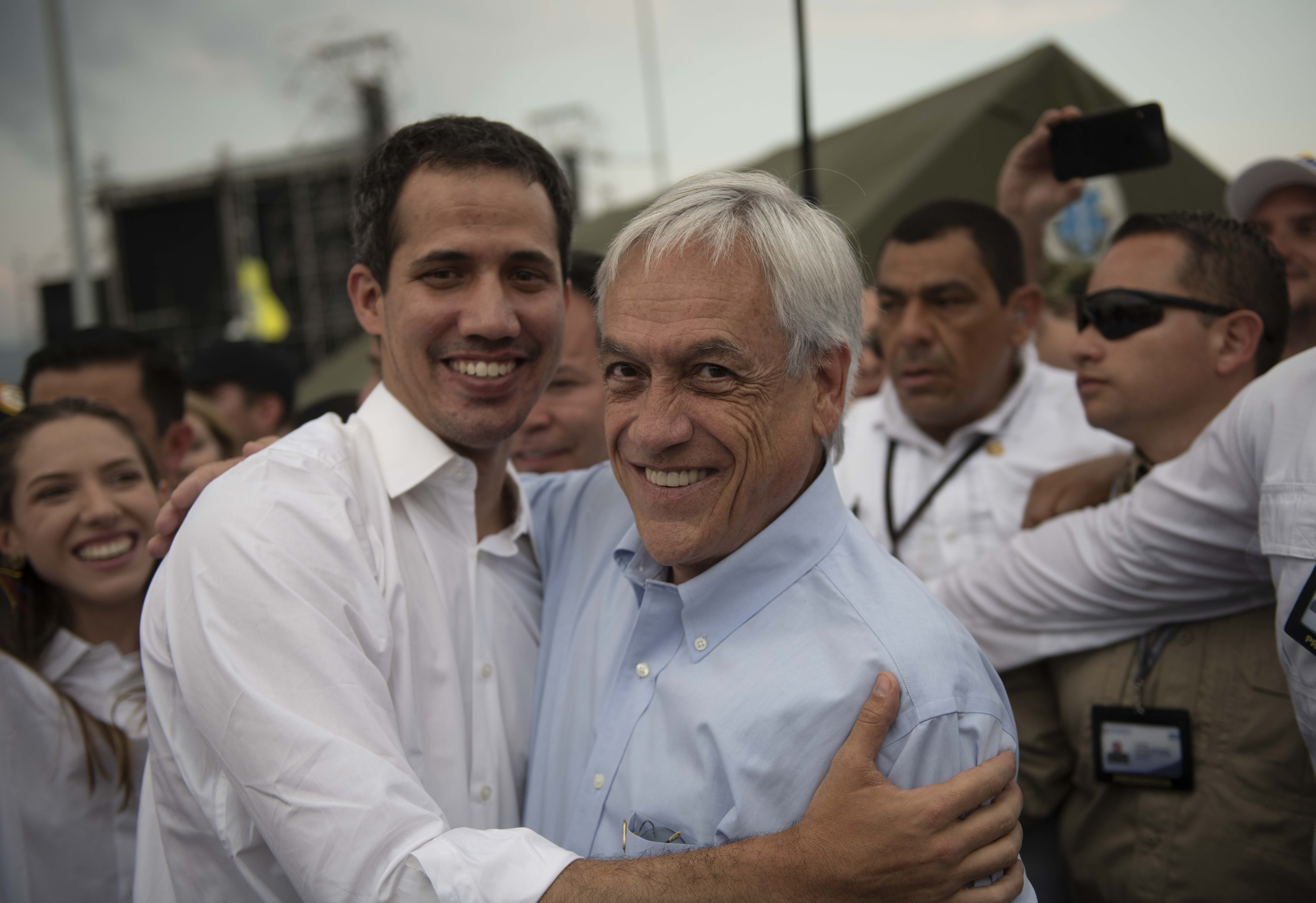
Guaidó and Chilean president Sebastián Piñera in Cúcuta during the delivery of humanitarian aid in Venezuela

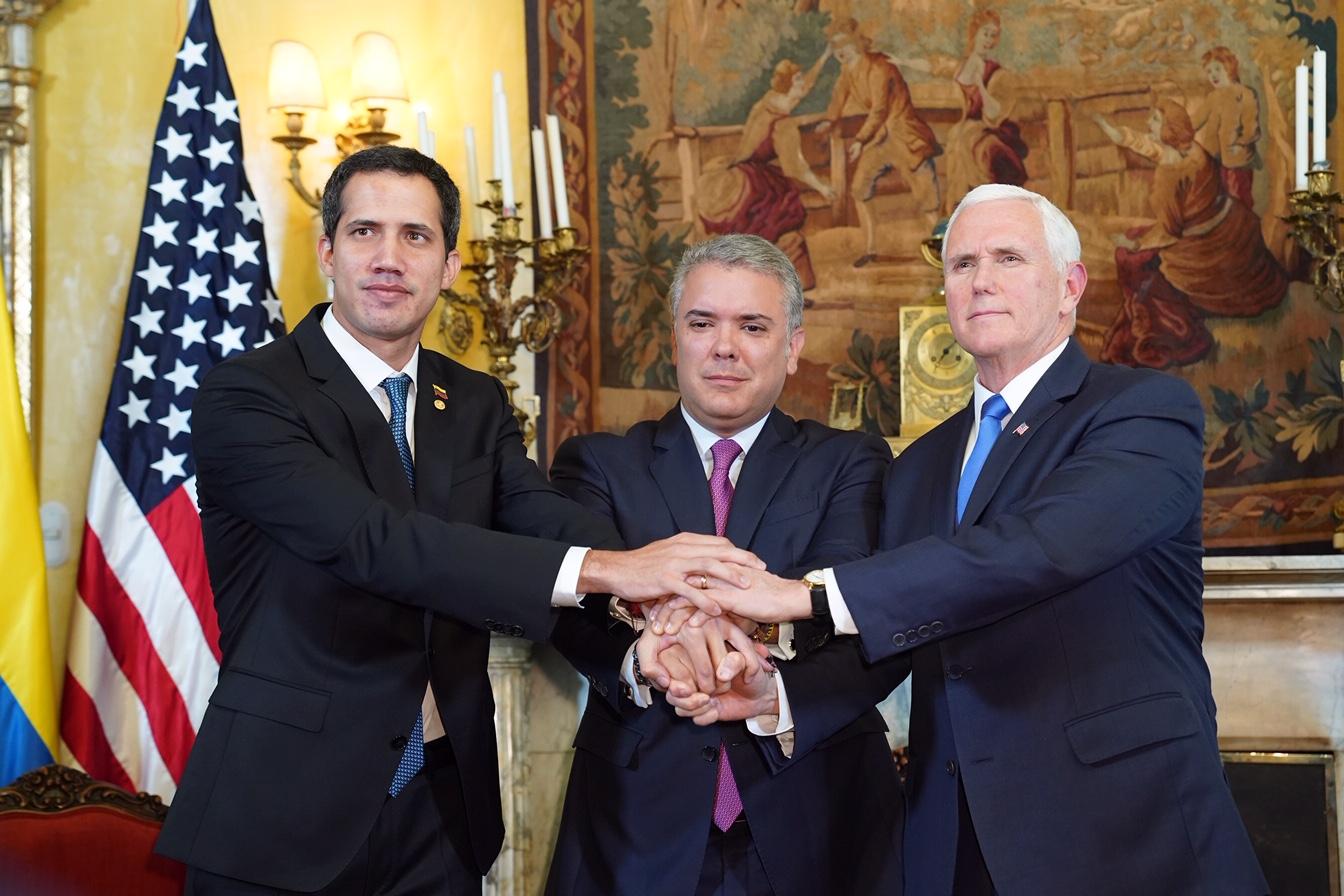
Juan Guaidó, Colombian president Iván Duque, and U.S. Vice President Mike Pence at the Lima Group summit in Colombia

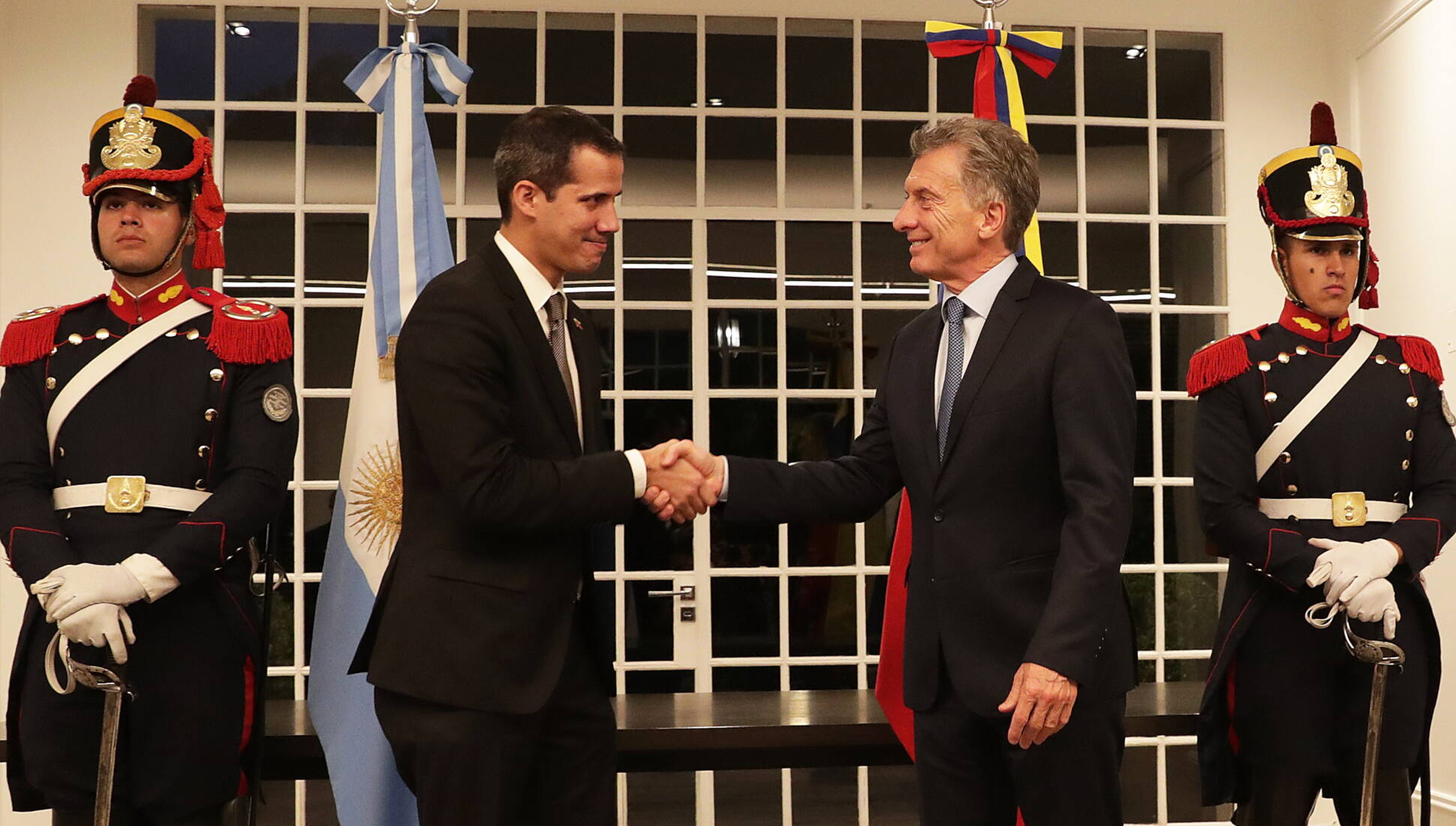
Argentine president Mauricio Macri receiving Guaidó at the Olivos Presidential Residence

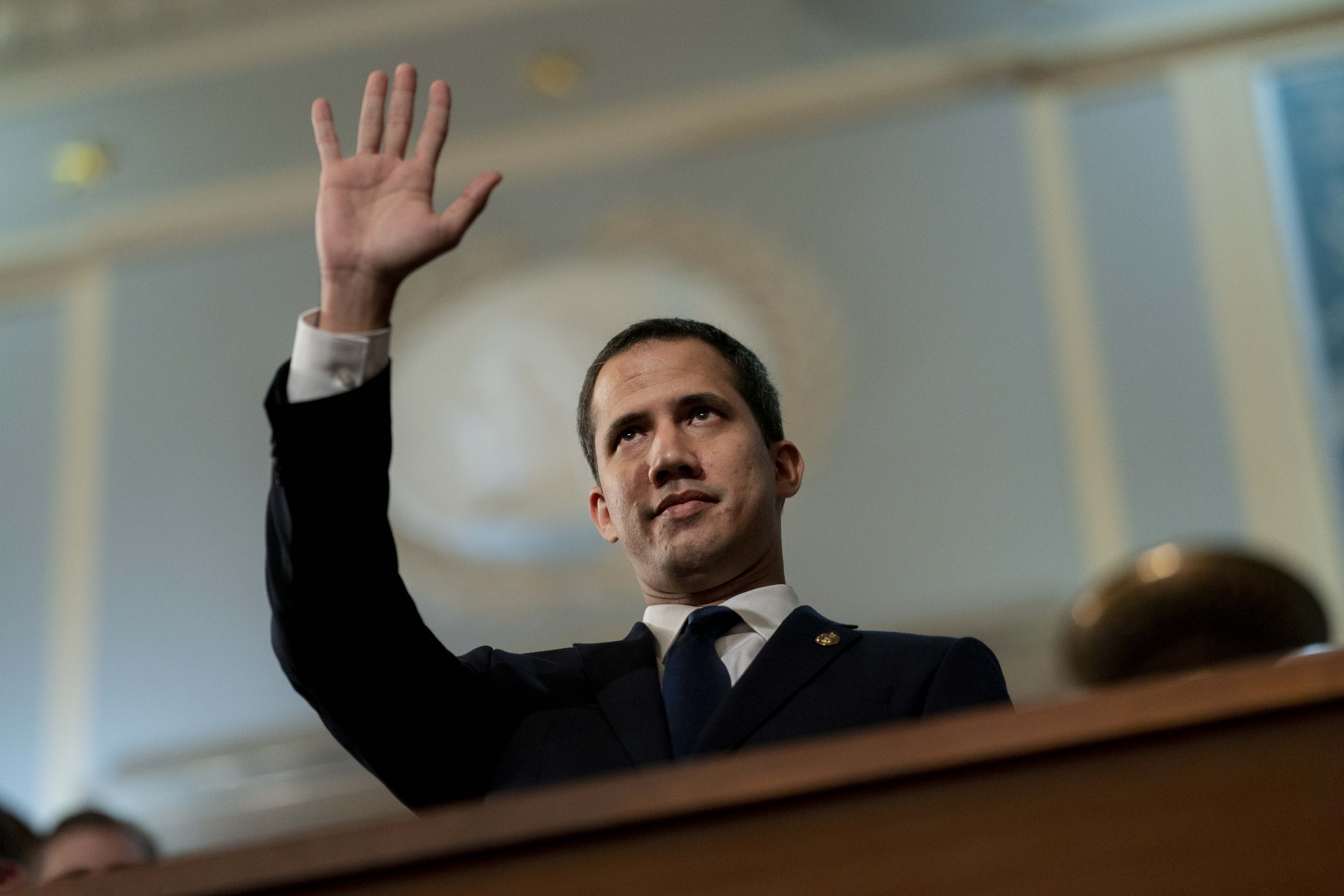
Juan Guaidó in the United States Congress during the State of the Union address (2020)

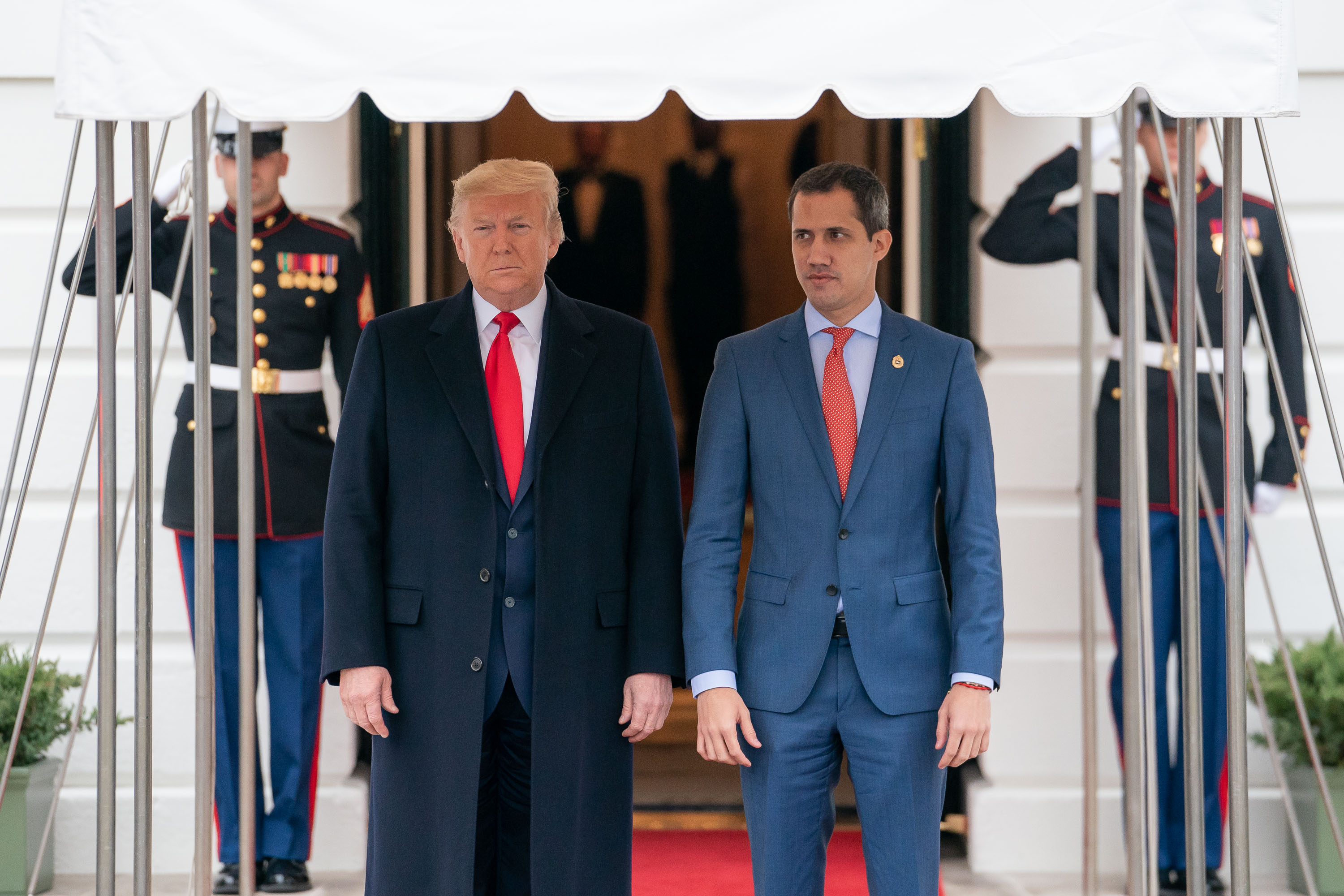
U.S. President Donald Trump receiving Guaidó at the White House

Date	Location	Main purpose
22 February	Cúcuta ( (Colombia) )	Venezuela Aid Live.
23 February	Cúcuta ( (Colombia) )	Delivery of humanitarian aid in Venezuela. Meeting with presidents Iván Duque of Colombia, Sebastián Piñera of Chile, and Mario Abdo Benítez of Paraguay, as well as Luis Almagro, secretary general of the Organization of American States.
24 February	Bogotá ( (Colombia) )	Meeting with U.S. Vice President Mike Pence.
25 February	Bogotá ( (Colombia) )	Summit of the Lima Group.
28 February	Brasília ( (Brazil) )	Meeting with Brazilian president Jair Bolsonaro.
1 March	Asunción ( (Paraguay) )	Meeting with Paraguayan president Mario Abdo Benítez.
1 March	Buenos Aires ( (Argentina) )	Meeting with Argentine president Mauricio Macri.
2 March	Quito ( (Ecuador) )	Meeting with Ecuadorian president Lenín Moreno.

==== 2020 ====
Date	Location	Main purpose
19 January	Bogotá ( (Colombia) )	Participation in a regional counterterrorism conference. Meeting with U.S. Secretary of State Mike Pompeo.
21 January	London ( (United Kingdom) )	Meeting with Prime Minister Boris Johnson.
22 January	Brussels ( (Belgium) )	Meeting with Margaritis Schinas and Josep Borrell.
23 January	Davos ( (Switzerland) )	Participation in the World Economic Forum.
25 January	Paris ( (France) )	Meeting with President Emmanuel Macron.
27 January	Ottawa ( (Canada) )	Meeting with Prime Minister Justin Trudeau.
4 February	Washington, D.C. ( (United States) )	Attendance at the State of the Union address.

=== Diplomatic officials ===
As of July 2019, the National Assembly had approved Juan Guaidó's appointment of 37 ambassadors and foreign representatives to international organizations and nations abroad.

Organization/country	Official
OAS	Gustavo Tarre Briceño
Inter-American Development Bank	Alejandro Plaz (Note: In August 2019, ambassador to the Czech Republic, Tamara Sujú, resigned. On September, Ricardo Hausmann also resigned as the Venezuelan representative to the Inter-American Development Bank.)
Lima Group	Julio Borges
Andorra	Carmen Alguindingue
Argentina	Elisa Trotta Gamus (2019–2020)
Australia	Alejandro Martínez
Belgium	Mary Ponte
Brazil	María Teresa Belandria
Bulgaria	Estefanía Meléndez
Canada	Orlando Viera Blanco
Chile	Guarequena Gutiérrez
Colombia	Vacant (Note: On 26 November 2019, Guaidó dismissed his ambassador in Colombia, Humberto Calderón, citing plans to change foreign policy. Venezuelan diplomat Diego Arria condemned the dismissal, calling it a "huge mistake.")
Costa Rica	María Faría
Czech Republic	Vacant (Note: In August 2019, ambassador to the Czech Republic, Tamara Sujú, resigned. On September, Ricardo Hausmann also resigned as the Venezuelan representative to the Inter-American Development Bank.)
Denmark	Enrique Ser Horst
Dominican Republic	Eusebio Carlino
Ecuador	René de Sola
France	Isadora Zubillaga
Germany	Otto Gebauer
Greece	Eduardo Fernando Massieu
Guatemala	María Teresa Romero
Honduras	Claudio Sandoval
Hungary	Enrique Alvarado
Israel	Pynchas Brener
Luxembourg	Angelina Jaffe
Malta	Felipe Zoghbi
Morocco	José Ignacio Guédez
Netherlands	Gloria Notaro
Panama	Fabiola Zavarce
Paraguay	David Olsen
Peru	Carlos Scull
Poland	Ana Medina
Portugal	José Rafael Cotas
Romania	Memo Mazzone
Spain	Antonio Ecarri Bolívar
Sweden	León Poblete
Switzerland	María Alejandra Aristeguieta
United Kingdom	Vanessa Neumann
United States	Carlos Vecchio

On 9 April, the OAS voted 18 to 9, with six abstentions, to accept Guaidó's envoy, Gustavo Tarre Briceño, as the ambassador from Venezuela until new elections can be held. The permanent council approved a text stating that "Nicolas Maduro's presidential authority lacks legitimacy and his designations for government posts, therefore, lack the necessary legitimacy." Antigua and Barbuda, Bolivia, Dominica, Grenada, Mexico, Saint Vincent and the Grenadines, Suriname, Uruguay, and Venezuela voted against the change. Maduro's administration responded calling Tarre a "loud-mouth political usurper" and the decision a "criminal and rampant violation of international law and the OAS Charter," saying they do not intend to respect decisions made by Tarre. The nomination was accepted 20 days before the deadline on Venezuela leaving the organization, after they triggered the process in 2017. According to The Washington Post, this acceptance undermined Maduro's presence internationally and marked a step in the official recognition of Guaidó's government. An effort by some OAS member states to remove Guaidó's OAS envoy in October 2022 failed, obtaining a majority but falling short of the two-thirds supermajority required.

In January 2020, Guaidó announced that he would appoint diplomatic representatives to Bolivia, El Salvador, and Uruguay.

The European Union (EU) announced on 6 January 2021, that it could no longer legally recognize Guaidó as interim president after he lost his position as head of parliament, without recognizing Maduro as the legitimate president. It also threatened new sanctions against the Maduro administration.

In January 2022, opposition parties voted to extend Guaidó's term as interim president for another year and to create a committee of opposition lawmakers to take over his management of foreign affairs, as well as to authorize the appointment of ambassadors in opposition allied countries. After the vote, Guaidó's role consisted in "defending democracy" and managing Venezuela's overseas assets, including oil refiner Citgo and $1 billion in gold lodged in the Bank of England. Guaidó required to keep the committee informed of how he had spent funds under his control.

In September 2022, Colombian President Gustavo Petro described Guaidó as a "non-existent" president with no control over the country and announced that his government would recognize only the Maduro government. Guaidó criticized Petro's reversal of recognition from the policy of prior Colombian President Iván Duque, saying that Maduro "sheltered world terrorism in Venezuela".

=== Military involvement ===
In an interview with Christiane Amanpour, Guaidó did not rule out accepting support from the US armed forces, but said that pressure was being applied in every other way possible to avoid armed conflict.

According to Giancarlo Fiorella, writing in Foreign Affairs, "calls for intervention" are coming from "some members of the Venezuelan opposition and from residents of the country desperate for a solution—any solution—to their years-long plight"; he adds that talk of foreign intervention "has become commonplace" in Venezuela, and that "the push for a military intervention in Venezuela is most intense not among hawks in Washington but inside the country itself." In every demonstration summoned by Guaidó, there are numerous signs demanding the approval of Article 187(11) of the Constitution, which allows the National Assembly to authorize the deployment of foreign missions in Venezuela. A March poll showed 87.5% support for foreign intervention. (Note: Foreign Affairs states "this figure is likely inflated—the surveys do not define what a military intervention under 187(11) would look like.) Guaidó has said he will call for intervention "when the time comes," but in media interviews, he has not stated he supports removing Maduro by force. He has said that the decision "cannot be taken lightly," and has appeared to "temper hopes ... [of] a magical solution to the country's problems," according to Fiorella.

==== Latin American tour ====
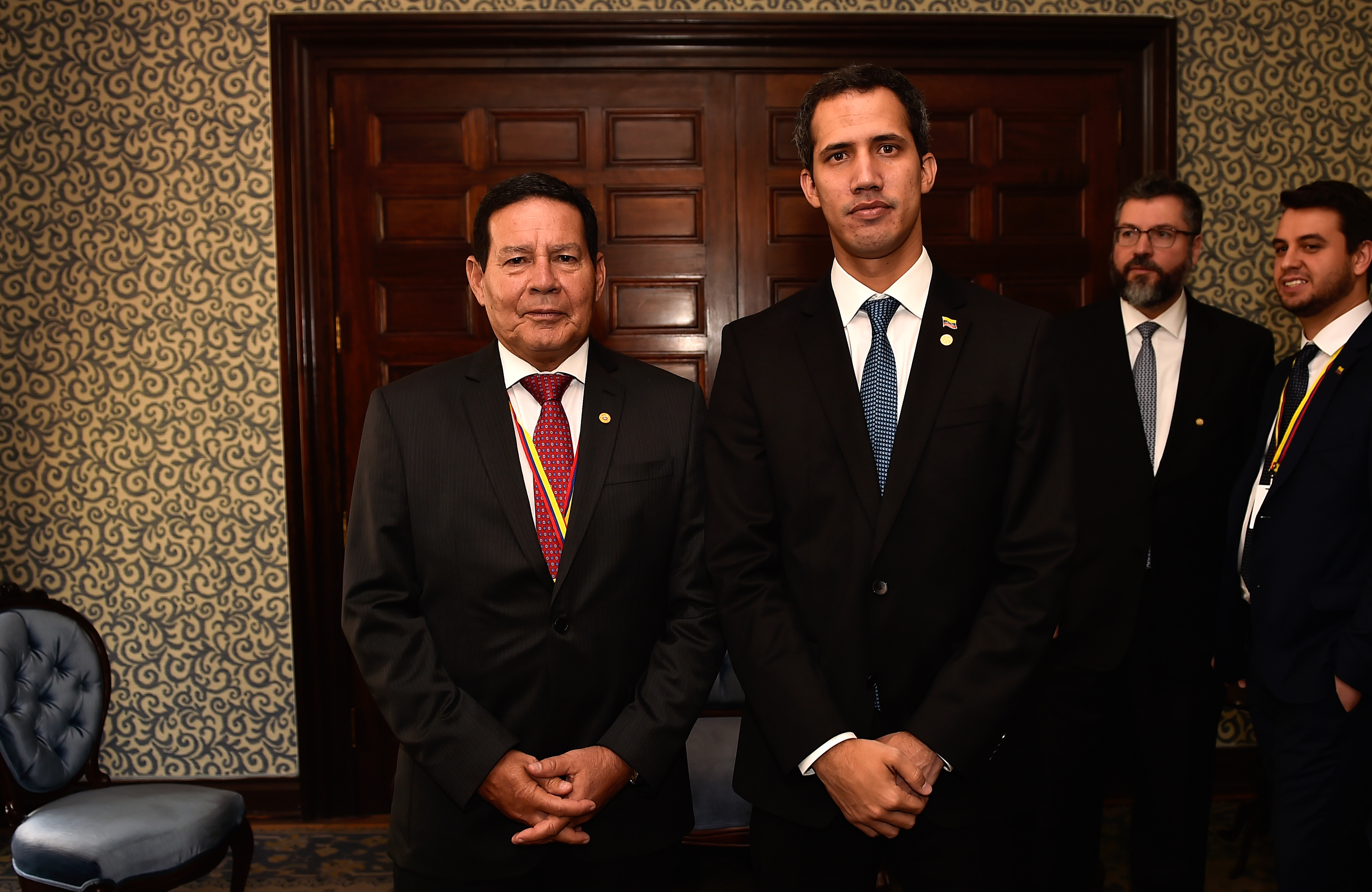
Juan Guaidó with Brazil's vice president Hamilton Mourão

Guaidó defied the restriction imposed by the Maduro administration on him leaving Venezuela, and attended Richard Branson's February 2019 Venezuela Live Aid concert in Cúcuta, Colombia, whose purpose was to raise funds and awareness for humanitarian aid to Venezuela. In a move that tested Maduro's authority, Guaidó was met by Colombian president Iván Duque, and welcomed by a crowd chanting, "Juan arrived!" Amid continuing tension, and having failed to get humanitarian aid into Venezuela, Guaidó and US vice president Pence attended a 25 February meeting of the Lima Group in Bogotá. From there, he embarked on a regional tour to meet with the presidents of Brazil, Paraguay, Argentina, and Ecuador, and discuss ways to rebuild Venezuela and defeat Maduro.

Guaidó's trip was approved by Venezuela's National Assembly, as required by the Constitution of Venezuela. Because he left the country under a travel restriction placed upon him by the Maduro administration, he faced the possibility of being imprisoned upon his return to Venezuela. Maduro said that Guaidó was welcome to return to Venezuela, but would have to face justice in the courts for breaching his travel ban. Guaidó announced that he planned to return to Venezuela despite the threats of imprisonment, and said Maduro's "regime" was "weak, lacking support in Venezuela and international recognition."

Guaidó returned to Caracas from Panama via a commercial flight; The Washington Post described his "triumphant return" to "wild cheers from supporters" at Venezuela's main airport at Maiquetía, Vargas state on 4 March. He proceeded from the airport to an anti-government demonstration—organized in advance on social media—in Las Mercedes, Caracas, where he addressed a crowd of thousands, offered a tribute to people who had lost their lives in the border clashes beginning on 23 February, and said that immigration officials had "greeted him at the airport with the words 'welcome, president'." He added: "It is evident that after the threats, somebody did not follow orders. Many did not follow orders. The chain of command [in the government security forces] is broken," according to BBC.

Following Guaidó's Latin American tour in February 2019, Elvis Amoroso, comptroller for the Maduro administration, alleged in March that Guaidó had not explained how he paid for the trip, and stated there were inconsistencies between his level of spending and income. Amoroso said that Guaidó's 90 trips abroad had cost $94,000, and that Guaidó had not explained the source of the funds. Based on these alleged financial discrepancies, Amoroso said Guaidó would be barred from running for public office for the maximum time allowed by law—fifteen years. Leopoldo López and Henrique Capriles had been prohibited from holding office by the Maduro administration on similar pretexts.

Guaidó responded that "The only body that can appoint a comptroller is the legitimate parliament." The comptroller general is not a judicial body; according to constitutional lawyer José Vicente Haro, the Inter-American Court of Human Rights ruled in 2011, after Leopoldo López was barred from holding office, that an administrative body cannot disallow a public servant from running. Constitutional law expert Juan Manuel Raffalli stated that Article 65 of Venezuela's Constitution provides that such determinations may only be made by criminal courts, after judgment of criminal activity. The decision would also breach Guaidó's parliamentary immunity.

=== Investigation of representatives in Colombia ===
In June 2019, the PanAm Post reported that Guaidó's representatives in Colombia had allegedly used money allocated to pay for defecting soldiers' accommodations for personal purchases, such as "parties and nightclubs." The representatives, Rossana Barrera and Kevin Rojas, are accused of embezzling up to $60,000; both deny the allegations and have not been charged.

Guaidó's presidential office dismissed Barrera and Rojas from their positions and requested the cooperation of the Colombian government, multilateral agencies and other organizations to clarify the events with an impartial investigation. The Venezuelan embassy in Colombia issued a statement informing that Guaidó and the appointed ambassador, Humberto Calderón, agreed to carry out an audit. Venezuelan political parties, including Popular Will, Justice First, Democratic Action and A New Era, supported the start of the investigation of the events. Colombian Foreign Minister, Carlos Holmes Trujillo, condemned the reported act of corruption and urged the authorities to advance the investigations to determine if any wrongdoings occurred. According to NPR's Philip Reeves, Guaidó's envoy in Colombia "began looking into this two months ago after being tipped off by Colombian intelligence," leading to "speculation that Guaidó may actually have known about this for a while." Guaidó has declared that the preliminary investigations started two months before the publication of the article.

== Political views ==
Guaidó was a member of the social-democratic Popular Will, now independent, and although his peers characterize Guaidó as a centrist, Maduro places him on the right of the political spectrum. Regarding politics in the United States, Guaidó stated that he was unfamiliar with the subject but has commented: "What they refer to as socialist in the United States is what we'd call a Social Democrat here."

== Domestic response ==
While announcing Plan País at the Central University of Venezuela on 31 January, Guaidó said special forces had come to his home and asked for Fabiana, his wife. He then gave a general warning, saying that he would hold anyone who threatened his 20-month-old daughter personally accountable for such actions. Journalists in the place confirmed that FAES officials surrounded his mother-in-law's house in the Baruta municipality and reported that neighbors tried to prevent the security forces from entering.

Maduro said Guaidó was a "clown," asking whether he would call elections or continue his "virtual mandate" until he was imprisoned by order of the Supreme Tribunal of Justice. During a speech given at the start of the judicial year, Maduro said that he was considering sending his assistant to kill Guaidó, adding seconds later that the remark was a joke.

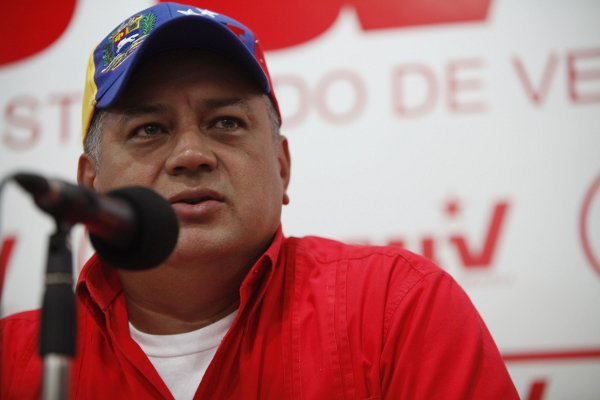
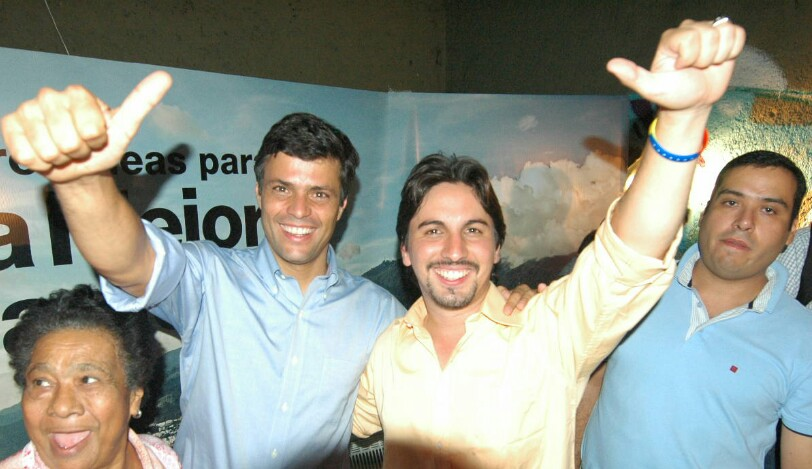
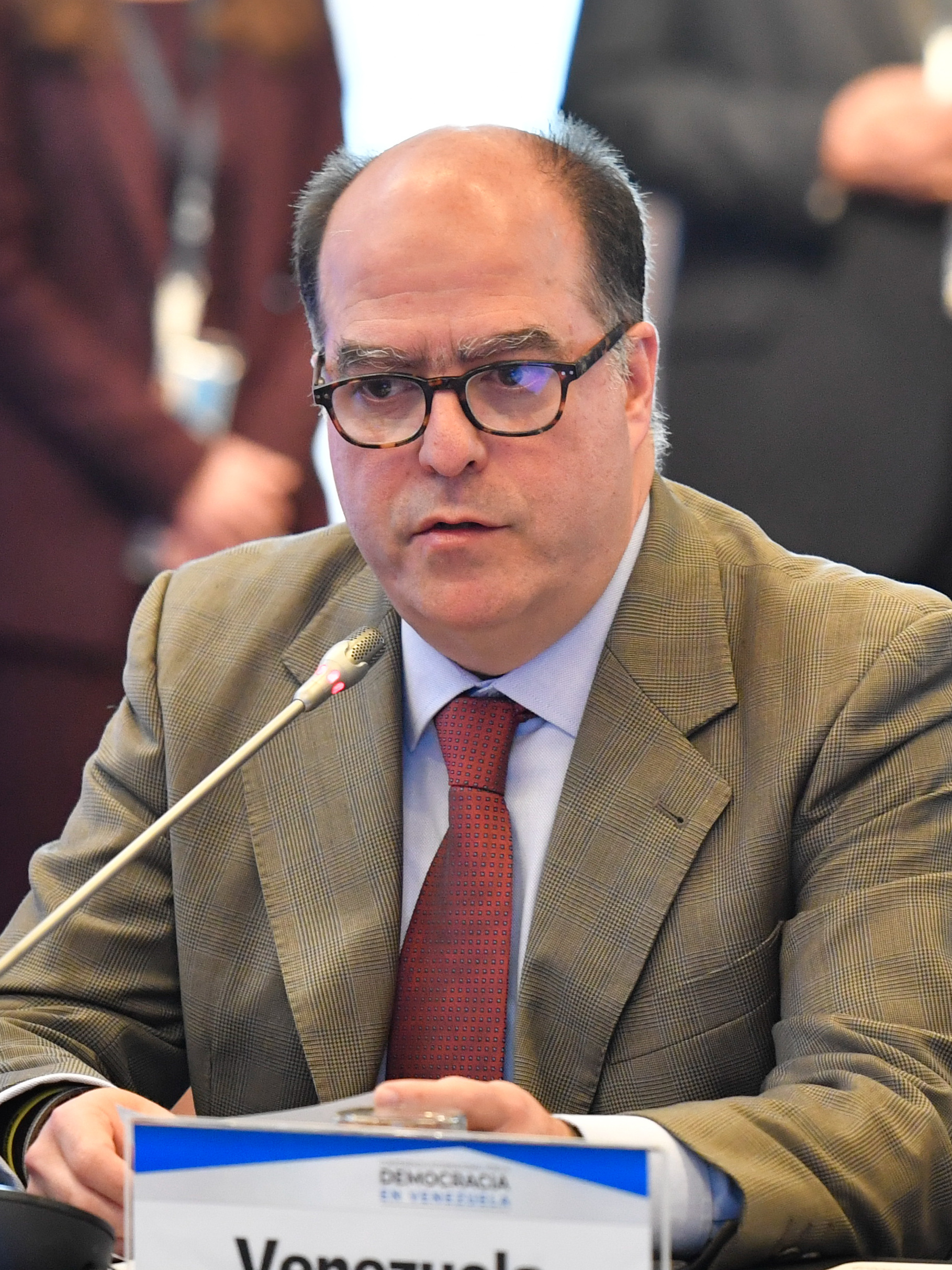
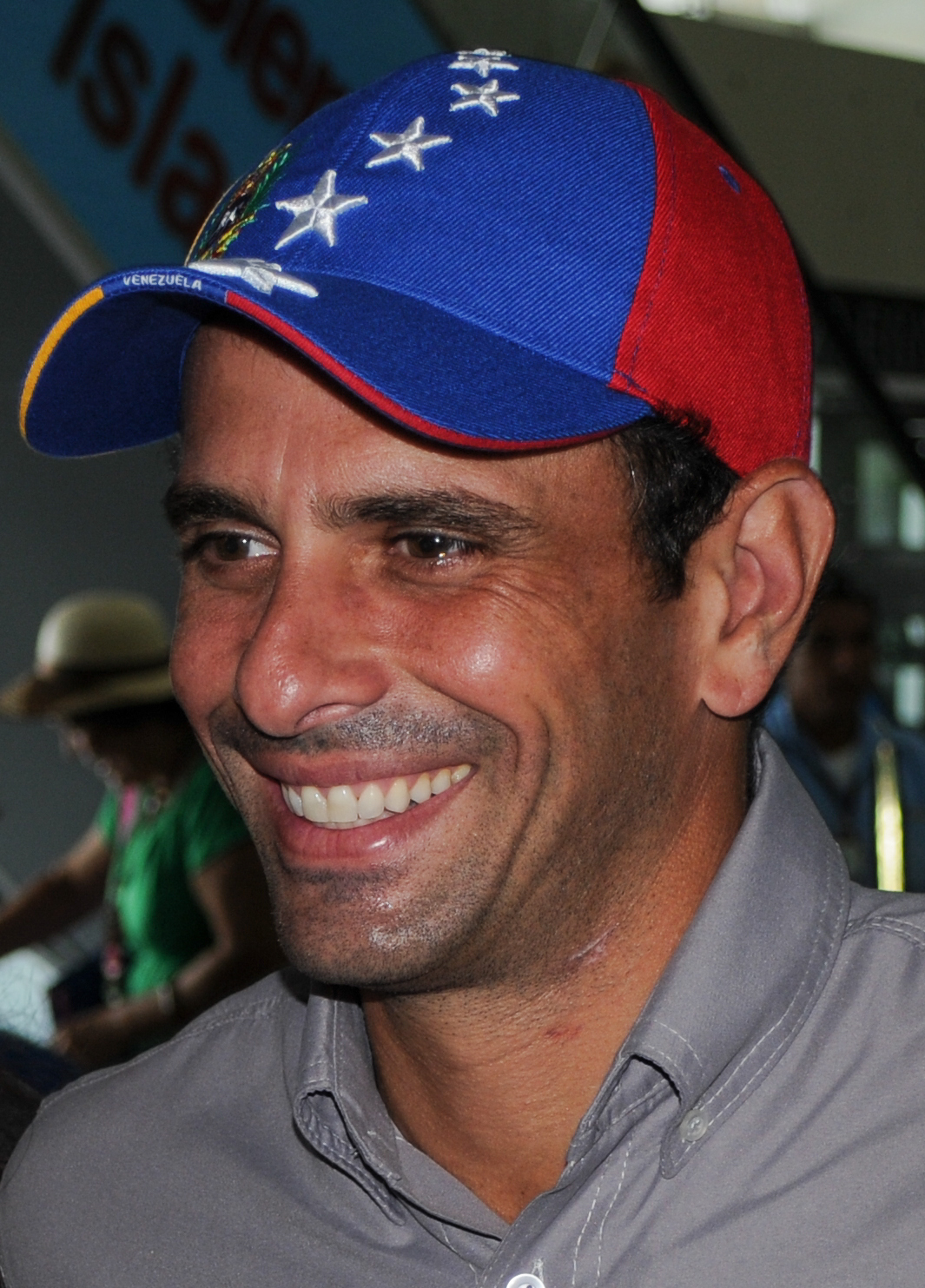
Top: Diosdado Cabello, Chavismo leader
middle: Leopoldo López and Freddy Guevara, both taking refuge in embassies
bottom: Julio Borges (in exile) and
Henrique Capriles

In a discussion before the Constituent National Assembly, Diosdado Cabello, the body's president, asked how far Guaidó was willing to go, saying that unlike the military, Guaidó had never experienced "the whistle of a bullet" nearby, and did not know "how it feels to have a bullet hit three centimetres from your head." Guaidó responded that "lamentably, the Venezuelan people have had to listen to a lot of whistling in these years," but that "we're not going anywhere" and "we're not afraid."

After Guaidó called for protests on 23 January 2019 against Maduro and in favor of "an interim government", the minister for Prison Services, Iris Varela, said that she had picked out a prison cell for Guaidó and asked him to be quick in naming his cabinet so she could prepare prison cells for them as well. In April 2019, Varela called Guaidó "garbage" on Twitter, saying that he assumes the direction of "a criminal gang that grotesquely steals money from the Venezuelan people with the gringos." She also said that warm cell and many years in jail were waiting to pay "for his crimes."

On 10 February, Guaidó said that his grandmother-in-law was threatened by colectivos. Guaidó told Euronews: "I am not worried about this costing my life or my freedom. If I give my life to serve the people. We know the risks we face. Our biggest fear is that what's happening in Venezuela becomes normal."

The Lima Group has stated that Guaidó and his family face "serious and credible threats" in Venezuela. Colombian Foreign Minister Carlos Holmes Trujillo said that "any violent actions against Guaidó, his wife, or family" would be met by all "legal and political mechanisms."

In an interview with the Mexican GQ magazine, Guaidó said that he has been persecuted and has received direct death threats from the Maduro government.

On 29 February 2020, colectivos shot at Guaidó and his supporters in Barquisimeto, Lara state, during a demonstration, leaving five injured.

During the March 2019 Venezuelan blackouts, Tarek William Saab called for an investigation of Guaidó, saying that he had "sabotaged" the electric sector; Guaidó said that Venezuela's largest-ever power outage was "the product of the inefficiency, the incapability, the corruption of a regime that doesn't care about the lives of Venezuelans."

Roberto Marrero, Guaidó's chief of staff, was arrested by SEBIN during a raid on his home in the early morning hours of 21 March. His attorney said he was to be charged with treason, usurpation of functions, and conspiracy. The US had repeatedly warned Maduro not to go after Guaidó; Haaretz reported that the arrest of Guaidó's number-two person was a test of the US. A risk consultant for London's IHS Markit, Diego Moya-Ocampos, said to Bloomberg that "the regime is testing the international community and its repeated warnings against laying a hand on Maduro's rival [Guaidó] ... if they can't touch him, they'll go after those close to him." Nicholas Watson of Teneo Intelligence told The Wall Street Journal that "Marrero's arrest looks like a desperate attempt to break Guaidó's momentum .. The weakness in the regime's position is visible in the fact that arresting Guaidó himself would be seen as a step too far." Guaidó called it a "vile and vulgar kidnapping," adding "Either Nicolas Maduro doesn't dare to arrest me, or he's not the one giving orders." According to The Wall Street Journal, Guaidó said he had received calls from security force officials disclaiming any involvement in the arrest; he replied that they need say no more, per the 2019 Venezuelan Amnesty Law; he said the "incident was indicative of divides within the Maduro regime."

On 1 April 2019, TSJ supreme justice Maikel Moreno (a political ally of Maduro) asked that the Constituent National Assembly (ANC) controlled by Chavismo remove Guaidó's parliamentary immunity as president of the National Assembly; that is, he asked that they "strip [him] of immunity from prosecution," which moves the Maduro administration a step closer towards arresting and prosecuting Guaidó. Maduro officials say that "Guaidó is under investigation for inciting violence against the government and receiving illicit funds." Moreno said the request is based upon Guaidó having attended the Venezuela Aid Live concert on 23 February, after the Maduro administration prohibited him from leaving the country; the trip was approved by the National Assembly. Supporters of Guaidó disagree that the Maduro-backed institutions have the authority to ban Guaidó from leaving the country, and consider acts of the ANC "null and void." The Venezuelan Constitution provides that only the National Assembly can bring the president to trial by approving the legal proceeding in a "merit hearing"; Venezuela's constitution requires "authorization in advance from the National Assembly." (Note: See Article 200 of the Constitution of the Bolivarian Republic of Venezuela.) Constitutional lawyer Juan Manuel Raffalli said there is no breach to prosecute unless the National Assembly first approves one; he said the proceedings were intended to distract attention from the protests and collapse of public services, referencing the 2019 Venezuelan blackouts.

Bypassing the National Assembly, Moreno sent Guaidó's file to the president of the ANC, Diosdado Cabello—described by BBC Mundo as "one of the most belligerent Chávez leaders against the opposition"—for the decision to be made by that body.

On 2 April, in a speech before the ANC, member María León proposed creating popular tribunals for trying "traitors," which the Miami Herald compared to those used during the Cuban revolution; she argued that "for me stripping him of his immunity is very little. What do you do with traitors?" ANC members "responded with shouts of al paredón ("put him up against a wall"), referring to a firing squad. Votes were not counted, rather voting was by a show of hands. In record time (less than 30 hours from the TSJ proceedings), the ANC voted to remove Guaidó's immunity from prosecution. Following the decision, Guaidó promised to continue fighting "Maduro's 'cowardly, miserable and murderous' regime." He said, "What if the regime intends to kidnap us? Well, of course, we know that they only have brute force left ... But we are left with audacity, intelligence, soul, strength of heart, hope and confidence in this country, in ourselves."

On 5 September, Vice President Delcy Rodríguez released a purported months-old recording in which Guaido's envoy to United Kingdom, Vanessa Neumann, and a Guaido's advisor, Manuel Avendaño, discuss that Guaidó should "drop the topic" on Venezuela's claim for Guayana Esequiba (Essequibo), a disputed territory between Guyana and Venezuela. Attorney general Tarek William Saab, announced that Guaidó would be prosecuted for "high treason" for the alleged negotiations to hand over the Esequibo. Since April, Norway mediated talks between Guaido and Maduro's commissions, but Maduro paused the discussion due to new US sanctions. In September, Maduro announced that his administration would not resume the talks due to the Esequibo investigation. Avendaño immediately sought refuge in Chilean embassy in Caracas. During a rally in Anzoátegui, Guaidó dismissed the accusations as a distraction, and reaffirmed that the Esequibo belongs to Venezuela.

Masked men carrying rifles broke and into the Popular Will office in the eve of the return of rallies in November, demanding the party members to handover their phones. The group identified as part of the special police forces (FAES), according to a legislator. Guaidó referred to the raid as an act of government intimidation.

On 21 January 2020, after the disrupted 2020 Venezuelan National Assembly Delegated Committee election, Guaidó's campaign headquarters were raided by police intelligence forces SEBIN.

On 4 June 2020, the Venezuelan Foreign minister Jorge Arreaza accused Juan Guaidó of hiding in the French Embassy in Caracas, demanding for him to be handed over to the "Venezuelan justice." However, the Foreign Ministry spokeswoman of France, Agnes von der Muhll denied the claims on 5 June that Guaido had taken refuge in any of the French diplomatic sites in Caracas.

After the Parliamentary Committee of Electoral Candidacies, in charge of appointing a new National Electoral Council of Venezuela (CNE), announced that it would suspend its meetings because of the COVID-19 pandemic, the Supreme Tribunal of Justice (TSJ), loyal to Nicolás Maduro, declared in June that the National Assembly had not named rectors for the CNE. The opposition to Maduro administration denounced it as attempt to obstruct the procedure for the elections. The TSJ decided on 12 June 2020 to name the electoral board that would oversee the parliamentary elections. Indira Alfonzo was declared as the new chief of the CNE through Facebook. Members of the National Assembly argue that the TSJ is not authorized to choose the board, according to the Venezuelan constitution. On 13 June 2020, Juan Guaidó said the opposition would not recognize a "false" electoral body named by the Supreme Tribunal, while his allies pledged to extend the term of the current legislature.

== Exile ==
Guaidó left Venezuela on 25 April 2023 for Colombia to attend a conference. The Colombian government considered deporting him, but he was eventually exiled to the United States. He has since lived in Miami, Florida, having joined Florida International University as a visiting professor in September 2023. As a senior leadership fellow at the university's Adam Smith Center for Economic Freedom, Guaidó was paid $40,000 for one semester.

=== Arrest warrant ===
On 6 October 2023, Maduro's Attorney General Tarek William Saab issued an arrest warrant against Guaidó in Venezuela, announcing charges of money laundering, treason and usurping public functions, and accusing him of profiting from the funds of Monómeros and Citgo. Saab said Guaidó had used the resources of the state-owned oil company Petróleos de Venezuela and his actions cost Venezuela $19 billion.

The Maduro administration also requested that Interpol issue a red notice for the arrest of Guaidó, though the international police agency has not issued such notices against opposition officials in the past. Guaidó responded to the arrest warrant by denying all charges. The Washington Post wrote that "Guaidó's interim government has long been accused by Maduro and even independent observers of mismanaging the public funds under its control". Senior fellow at the Atlantic Council Geoff Ramsey responded to the issued warrant stating "the government has now officially placed Guaidó in the same category as other exiled opposition politicians: effectively banned from returning but no longer relevant enough to be seen as untouchable." Elliott Abrams, who was the US Special Representative for Venezuela during Guaidó's interim presidency, called the charges "nonsense" and "completely false"; he stated that Venezuelan assets were overseen by the US Treasury's Office of Foreign Assets Control, and denied any funds were directed to Guaidó or misused, and questioned the timing of the arrest warrant.

== Personal life ==
Guaidó is married to journalist Fabiana Rosales since 2013. They have two daughters: Miranda and Mérida Antonieta. Guaidó is also a Freemason.

== Public perception ==
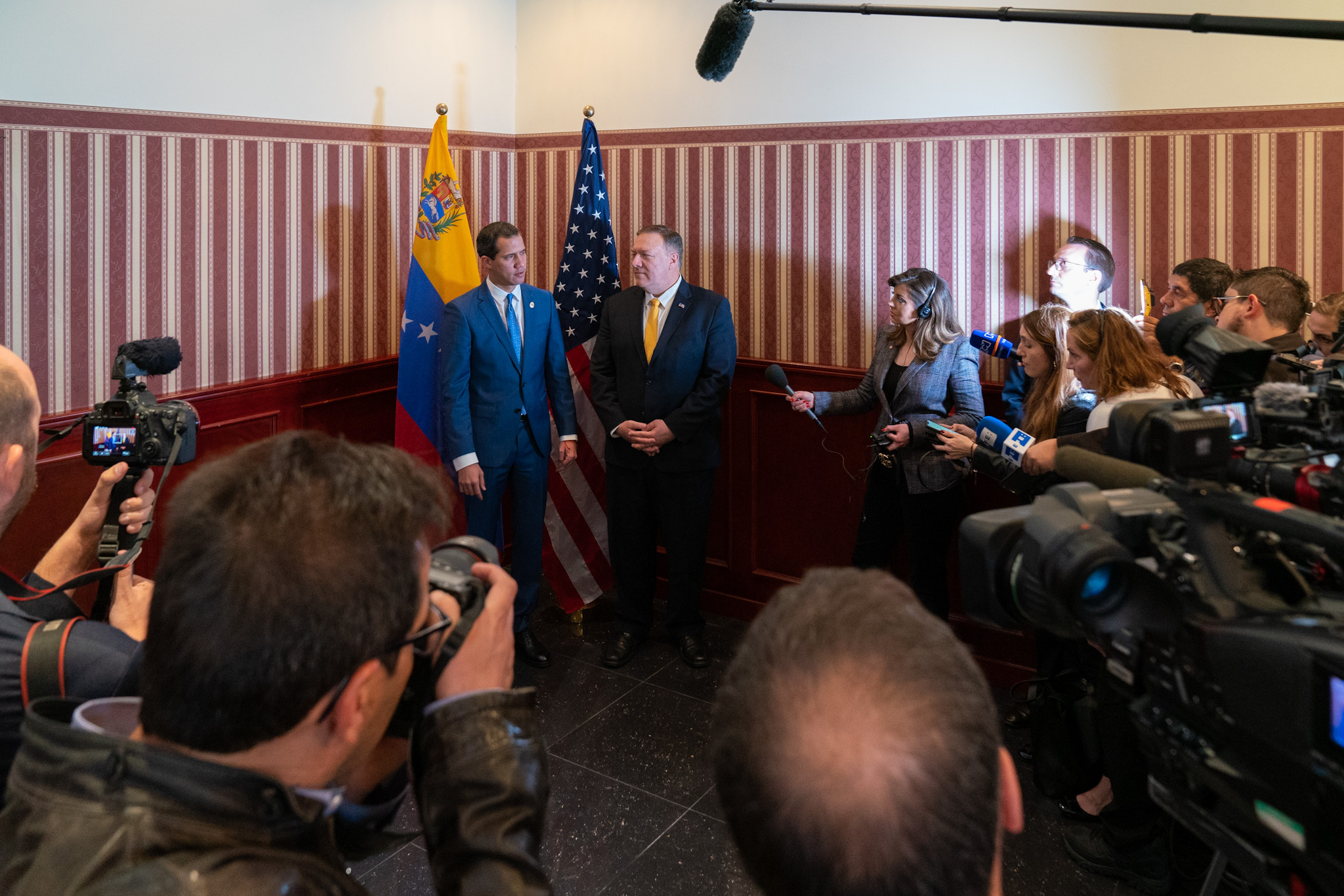
Guiadó, alongside US Secretary of State Mike Pompeo, speaks to the press in Bogotá, Colombia in January 2020

Prior to becoming the leader of the National Assembly, Guaidó was an unfamiliar figure to both the Venezuelan and international communities, with the BBC reporting that he was a compromise candidate selected as leader by opposition parties. Venezuelan lawyer and columnist Gustavo Tovar-Arroyo, who was active with Guaidó in the early days of the student protests against Hugo Chávez, described Guaidó as one of the "conciliators" of the student movement, saying that Guaidó had been a force for conciliation in the defeat of Chávez's 2007 constitutional referendum and the 2015 Venezuelan parliamentary election in which the PSUV was defeated by the MUD, and that he was named acting president at a time when Venezuela needed conciliation.

According to a Bloomberg article, he is known for "building unity among fellow legislators." Michael Shifter said that he "has tried to reach out to the military, tried to unify the opposition and tried to reach Chavista folks as well."

In April 2019, Guaidó was named to Time magazine's list of 100 most influential people in the world for that year. Former Colombian president Juan Manuel Santos wrote the profile for Time, which described Guaidó as "young, energetic, articulate, determined" and in possession of "the mother of all virtues: courage." Santos said that "by being in the right place at the right time, [Guaidó] was able to finally unite the opposition and become a beacon of hope for a country that is yearning for a rapid and peaceful change." Hetland wrote that Guaidó was initially popular domestically, though he increasingly participated in desperate actions to remove Maduro, with each attempt failing and resulting with decreased support.

=== Polls ===
Following the failed uprising on 30 April 2019, recognition and support for Guaidó declined while attendance at his demonstrations subsided. After plans to remove Maduro from power failed in May 2020, Guaidó saw his support decrease further. With Maduro retaining control of the country's security forces, Datanálisis surveys in October 2021 showed Guaidó's support within Venezuela had dropped to 16%, partly due to accusations of corruption against some of his representatives outside of the country.

Polling company	Dates	Location	Number polled	Results
Meganálisis	5–9 May 2020	Venezuela	957	88.3% of respondents believed that Guaidó was incapable of governing Venezuela, 4.1% thought that he was able to govern and 7.5% did not know.
Meganálisis	2–13 March 2020	Venezuela	1,350	71.0% recognized Maduro as president, 23.7% saw neither as president, 3.0% recognized Guaidó as president and 2.2% did not know who to recognize as president
Meganálisis	23 January–7 February 2020	Venezuela	1,480	63.8% of respondents did not support Guaidó, 13.3% did not know if they supported him, 12.1% never supported him and 10.7% supported Guaidó
Meganálisis	25 November–2 December 2019	Venezuela	1,580	Guaidó had an approval rating of 10.3% and disapproval rating of 68.5%. Maduro had an approval rating of 8.7% and a disapproval rating of 40.8%.
Hercon Consultores	September 2019	Venezuela	1,200	72.9% of respondents recognized Guaidó as president while Maduro was seen as president by 18.3% of those polled
Datincorp	2 June 2019	Venezuela	1,200	36% recognized Guaidó as president, 41% recognized Maduro as president, 2% recognized both equally, 18% recognized neither, and 4% did not know or had no opinion. In the case of early elections, 33% would vote for Guaidó, 24% would choose another candidate, 18% would not vote, 16% would vote for Maduro, and 7% had no opinion.
Hercon Consultores	8–17 May 2019	Venezuela	1,000	70.3% recognized Guaidó as president, 12.1% recognized Maduro as president, 8.8% were undecided and 8.7% did not answer
Meganálisis	2–4 May 2019	16 Venezuelan states, 32 cities	1,120	49.8% recognized Guaidó as president, 35.4% do not know who is president, 10.5% recognized neither Guaidó nor Maduro as president, 4.2% recognized Maduro as president
Datanálisis	May 2019	Venezuela	–	56.7% approved of Guaidó while 10.1% approved of Maduro
Hercon Consultores	1–4 April 2019	Venezuela	1,000	77.9% recognized Guaidó as president, 14.5% said Maduro was president, 7.5% undecided
Meganálisis	28–30 March 2019	16 Venezuelan states, 32 cities	1,040	54.9% recognized Guaidó as acting president, 26.1% do not know who is president, 12.3% recognized neither Guaidó nor Maduro as president, 6.6% say Maduro is president
Meganálisis	11–14 March 2019	16 Venezuelan states, 32 cities	1,100	63.3% recognized Guaidó as acting president, 22.5% do not know who is president, 9.1% recognized neither Guaidó nor Maduro as president, 5.0% say Maduro is president
Datanálisis	Published; 2 March 2019	Venezuela		Guaidó approval at 61%; Maduro approval at 14% In an election, Guaidó would win 77% to Maduro's 23%
Hercon Consultores	Published March 2019	Venezuela	1,000	73.4% recognized Guaidó as president, 15.7% did not recognize Guaidó as president, 10.8% undecided
Hercon Consultores	24–27 February 2019	Venezuela	1,000	80.3% recognized Guaidó as president, 14.3% did not recognize Guaidó as president, 5.3% undecided
Consultores 21	19–20 February 2019	8 Venezuelan states, Capital District	300	54% recognized Guaidó as the legitimate president, 35% recognized Maduro as legitimate president, 11% we undecided
Meganálisis	13–16 February 2019	16 Venezuelan states, 32 cities	1,250	78.9% recognized Guaidó as acting president, 16.8% undecided, 4.2% say Maduro is president
Datincorp	10 February 2019	Venezuela	1,200	49.33% recognized Guaidó as acting president, 33.81% say Maduro is president
Meganálisis	4–6 February 2019	16 Venezuelan states, 32 cities	1,020	82.9% recognized Guaidó as acting president, 13.5% undecided, 3.5% say Maduro is president
Meganálisis	30 January – 1 February 2019	16 Venezuelan states, 32 cities	1,030	84.6% recognized Guaidó as acting president, 11.2% undecided, 4.1% say Maduro is president
Hercon Consultores	25–30 January 2019	Venezuela	999	81.9% recognized Guaidó as president, 13.4% said Maduro was president, 4.6% undecided
Meganálisis	24–25 January 2019	16 Venezuelan states, 32 cities	870	83.7% recognized Guaidó as president, 11.4% undecided, 4.8% recognized Maduro as president
Meganálisis	19–20 January 2019	16 Venezuelan states, 32 cities	900	81.4% hoped that Guaidó would be sworn in on 23 January, 84.2% supported a transitional government to replace Maduro's government
Hercon Consultores	15–19 January 2019	Venezuela	1,100	79.9% agreed with Maduro leaving the presidency. To the National Assembly swearing in Guaidó as acting president, 68.6% agreed and 19.4% disagreed.

== Electoral history ==
=== 2015 parliamentary vote ===
- 2015 Venezuelan parliamentary election, Deputy for Vargas (1st district).

Candidate	Party	Votes	%	Result
Milagros Eulate	MUD	98,530	26.29%	Deputy
Juan Guaidó	MUD	97,492	26.01%	Deputy
María Carneiro	PSUV	84,872	22.64%	Not elected
José Pinto	PSUV	83,462	22.27%	Not elected
Jesús Sánchez	DR	2,098	0.55%	Not elected
Estela Romero	DR	1,886	0.55%	Not elected
Disqualified votes		35,569	8.66%	
Total valid votes		374,773	74.64%	

=== 2012 MUD primary ===
- 2012 Democratic Unity Roundtable presidential primary, pre-candidate for governor of Vargas.

Candidate	Party	Votes	%	Result
José Manuel Olivares	PJ	17,547	61.1%	Nomination
Juan Guaidó	VP	5,184	18.1%	Not elected
Salomón Bassim	PJ	2,280	7.9%	Not elected
Arquímides Rivero	GDV	1,819	6.3%	Not elected
Ramón Díaz	Ind.	1,625	5.7%	Not elected
Luis Pino	CC	264	0.9%	Not elected
Total valid votes		28,719		

=== 2010 parliamentary vote ===
- 2010 Venezuelan parliamentary election, reserve deputy for Vargas.

Candidate	Party	Votes	%	Result
Oswaldo Vera	PSUV	84,241	54.82%	Deputy
Simón Escalona	PSUV	84,241	54.82%	Reserve deputy
Bernardo Guerra	MUD	66,553	43.31%	Deputy
Juan Guaidó	MUD	66,553	43.31%	Reserve deputy
Others		2,865	1.81%	
Disqualified votes		4,352	2.75%	
Total valid votes		153,659	63.86%	

== See also ==
- Operation Alacrán
- 2017 Venezuelan constitutional crisis

== Notes ==
Political offices
Preceded by Omar Barboza	President of the National Assembly of Venezuela; 2019–2023	Succeeded by Luis Parra
Preceded by Nicolás Maduro	President of Venezuela (Disputed with Nicolás Maduro); 2019–2023	Succeeded by Nicolás Maduro
