= María Teresa Belandria =

Venezuelan diplomat, lawyer, professor and politician

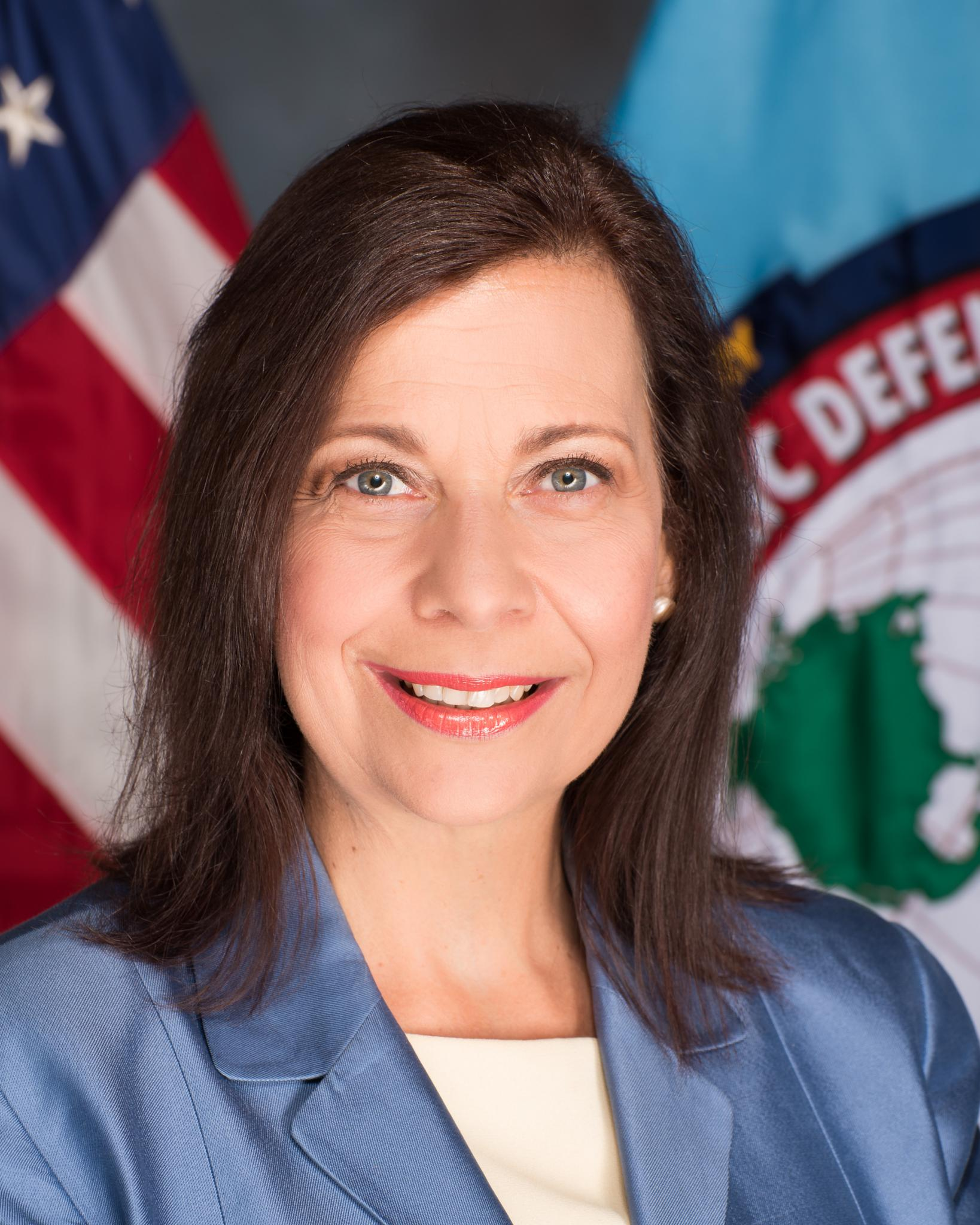

Ambassador of Venezuela to Brazil
- In office 5 February 2019 – 1 January 2023
- Appointed by: National Assembly of Venezuela
- President: Juan Guaidó
- Succeeded by: Manuel Vadell

Personal details
- Occupation: Lawyer, diplomat

María Teresa Belandria is a Venezuelan diplomat, lawyer, professor of political science, and politician who was named by Juan Guaidó and received as Venezuela's ambassador to Brazil in February 2019. She served as the international coordinator for the Venezuelan political party, Come Venezuela (Spanish: Vente Venezuela). On 4 June 2019, the Brazilian government approved her credentials and recognized her as the official ambassador of Venezuela.
