= Carmen Alguindigue =

Venezuelan ambassador

Ambassador of Venezuela to Andorra
- In office 2019–2023
- Appointed by: National Assembly of Venezuela
- President: Juan Guaidó

Carmen Eloisa Alguindigue Morles is a Venezuelan lawyer, university professor and researcher, and a regulatory compliance and governance consultant based in France. She is accredited before the International Criminal Court.

== Career ==
She has spent much of her career within the justice system. From 1994 to 1999, at the Ministry of Justice, after holding several technical posts, she served as Director General of Prisons and Crime Prevention and later as Director of Legal Framework (Ordenamiento Jurídico). During that period she was also Executive Secretary of the National Commission on Legislation, Codification and Case Law, and was part of the Ministry's executive advisory team for the implementation of the Organic Code of Criminal Procedure. As a member of the Advisory Committee of the National Women's Council, she took part in drafting and implementing the Law on Violence against Women and the Family, enacted in 1998. From 1999 to 2004 she worked at the Public Prosecutor's Office (Ministerio Público), where, while serving as a criminal prosecutor, she was appointed Director General of Procedural Action.

== International cooperation and justice reform ==
Much of her public career was linked to international cooperation programs for justice reform. From 1997 to 1998 she coordinated the Penitentiary Sector Assistance Program funded by the European Community, and from 1998 to 1999 she directed the Spanish Embassy's Penitentiary Sector Modernization Program. In 1998 she was in charge, on behalf of the Ministry of Justice, of the Inter-American Development Bank (IDB) Justice Sector Reform Program, and from 1999 to 2004 she sat on its Coordinating Commission as the representative of the Public Prosecutor's Office. Between 2001 and 2004 she also coordinated that institution's criminal procedure reform cooperation programs with the embassies of the United States, Spain, France and Germany. She is a graduate of the Inter-American Program for the Training of Trainers for Criminal Procedure Reform of the Justice Studies Center of the Americas (CEJA), within whose framework she has published work on the Venezuelan criminal procedure system. She served on several commissions responsible for preparing and presenting Venezuela's compliance reports under international human rights treaties to the United Nations treaty bodies.

== Professional practice and teaching ==
After leaving the Public Prosecutor's Office in 2004, she devoted herself fully to teaching and litigation, mainly in corporate criminal law, and worked in the private sector as an adviser and consultant to energy and oil companies. Her fields of work are criminal law, regulatory compliance, auditing and digital law. She has taught continuously at university level since 2002, in undergraduate and graduate programs; she has been a member of the permanent faculty of the Central University of Venezuela, the Andrés Bello Catholic University and the Metropolitan University, and a visiting professor at other institutions. At the Central University of Venezuela she teaches Digital Law, Business Criminal Law and International Criminal Law in the Specialization in Criminal and Criminological Sciences, on whose academic committee she served until 2023; at the Metropolitan University she headed the Department of Legal Studies until 2017. She is a co-founder of the Human Rights Center of the Metropolitan University and a former member of the Human Rights Center of the Central University of Venezuela. She took part in the defense of students detained during the 2014 protests and in subsequent years. She combines professional practice and teaching with research, focused mainly on the functioning of justice systems. She is registered on the List of Counsel of the International Criminal Court; in 2022 she was one of the four Venezuelan lawyers accredited before it.

== Activity in France and representation to Andorra ==
She has lived in France since 2017. In February 2019, during the Venezuelan presidential crisis, she was appointed representative to the Principality of Andorra at a session of the National Assembly elected in 2015. In September of that year, as part of a series of raids on the homes of representatives appointed by Juan Guaidó, officers of the Special Action Forces (FAES) raided her home in Caracas. Since 2024 she has headed LEXHUMANIS, a French consultancy specializing in regulatory compliance and digital law, focused on the regulatory frameworks of Latin America and Europe. She works actively with human rights non-governmental organizations in Venezuela and in Europe, including La Cimade and Conciencia es Dignidad, and belongs to several associations specializing in artificial intelligence.

== Published works and articles ==
- Alguíndigue, Carmen, "Ministerio Público venezolano", in Dias and Ghiringhelli (eds.), O papel do Ministério Público. Estudo comparado dos países latino-americanos, Coimbra, 2008.
- Alguíndigue, Carmen and Pérez Perdomo, Rogelio, "The inquisitor strikes back: obstacles to the reform of criminal procedure in revolutionary Venezuela", Southwestern Journal of Law and Trade in the Americas, vol. 15, no. 1, 2008, pp. 101–122.
- Alguíndigue, Carmen and Pérez Perdomo, Rogelio, "La prisión preventiva en tiempos de revolución (Venezuela 1998-2008)", in Riego and Duce (eds.), Prisión preventiva y reforma procesal penal en América Latina. Evaluación y perspectivas, Santiago, Chile, CEJA, 2008.
- Alguíndigue, Carmen and Pérez-Perdomo, Rogelio, "The Inquisitor Strikes Back: Obstacles to the Reform of Criminal Procedure in Revolutionary Venezuela", in Friedman, Lawrence M.; Pérez-Perdomo, Rogelio and Gómez, Manuel A. (eds.), Law in Many Societies: A Reader, Stanford, Stanford University Press, 2011, pp. 220–228.
- Alguíndigue, Carmen, "La capacidad de persecución penal en Venezuela", in Riego and Duce (eds.), Estudios comparados de reforma procesal penal en América Latina, Santiago, Chile, CEJA, 2011.
- Alguíndigue, Carmen and Pérez Perdomo, Rogelio, "Crimen, proceso y castigo en Venezuela revolucionaria 1999-2010", Revista del Instituto de Ciencias Penales y Criminológicas, Caracas, Central University of Venezuela, 2012.
- Alguíndigue, Carmen and Pérez Perdomo, Rogelio, "Revolución y proceso penal en Venezuela 1999-2012",Anales de la Universidad Metropolitana, vol. 13, no. 2, 2013, pp. 119–144.
- Alguíndigue Morles, Carmen, "Venezuela", in Fuchs, Marie-Christine; Fandiño, Marco and González, Leonel (eds.), La justicia penal adversarial en América Latina. Hacia la gestión del conflicto y la fortaleza de la ley, Santiago, Chile, CEJA and Konrad-Adenauer-Stiftung, 2018.
- Alguíndigue, Carmen; Meier, Henrique et al., Penalización de la actividad empresarial en Venezuela, Caracas, Metropolitan University, 2020.
- Alguíndigue Morles, Carmen E., "La imputación en el sistema procesal penal venezolano. Dieciocho años de vigencia del Código Orgánico Procesal Penal", Caracas, Metropolitan University, n.d.
