= Elisa Trotta Gamus =

Venezuelan lawyer, diplomat and human rights activist

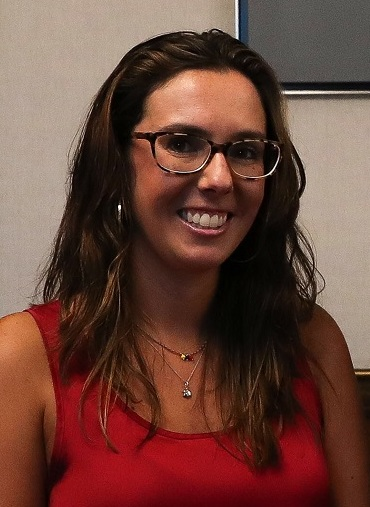

Ambassador of Venezuela to Argentina
- In office 29 January 2019 – 7 January 2020
- Appointed by: National Assembly of Venezuela
- President: Juan Guaidó

Personal details
- Born: Elisa Alejandra Trotta Gamus
- Occupation: Lawyer, diplomat

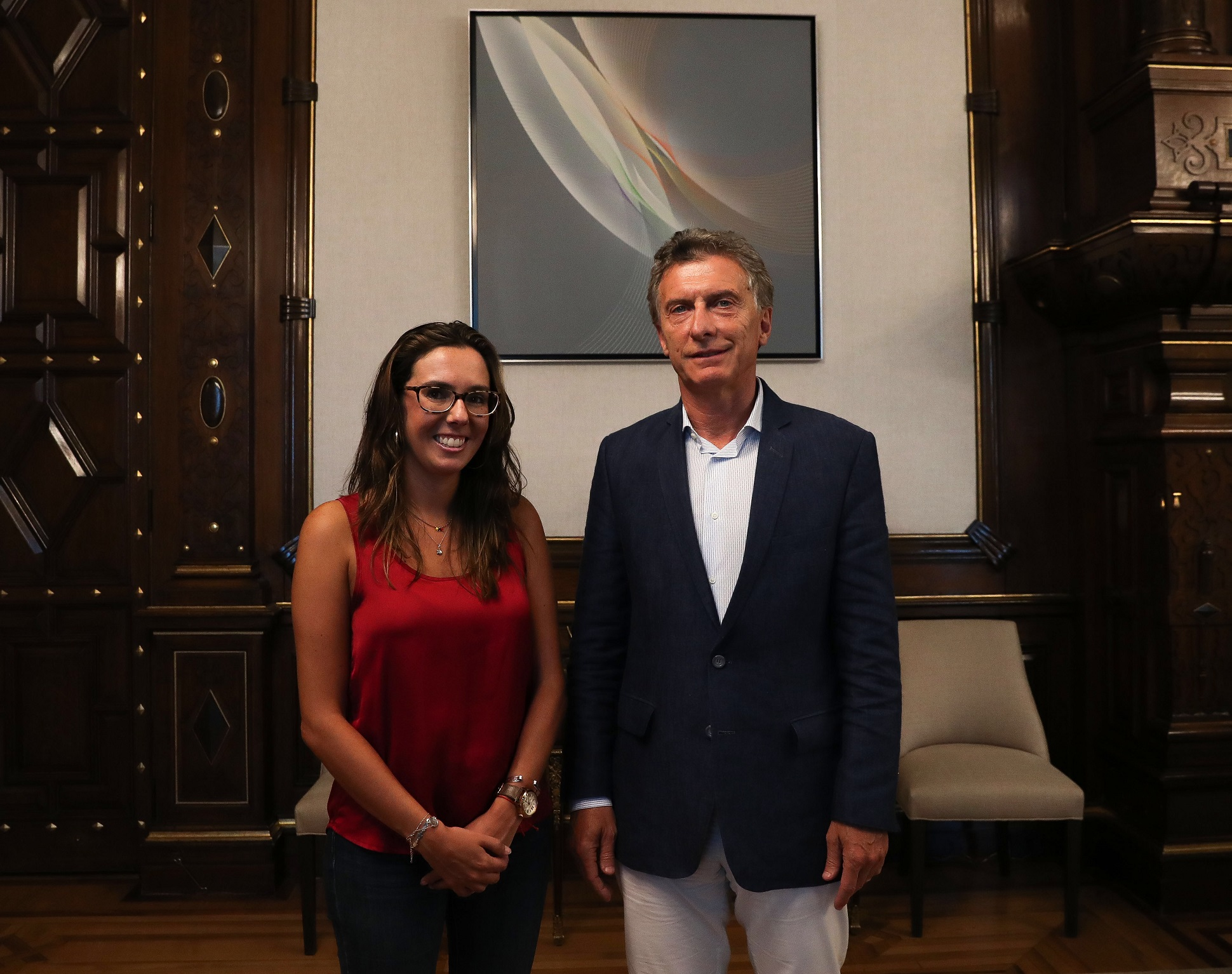
Trotta and Mauricio Macri, President of Argentina

Elisa Alejandra Trotta Gamus is a Venezuelan lawyer, diplomat and human rights activist, named ambassador from Venezuela to Argentina by Juan Guaidó during the 2019 Venezuelan presidential crisis, and recognized immediately by Argentine president Mauricio Macri. The following administration of Alberto Fernández removed Trotta Gamus credentials.

== Biography ==
Trotta Gamus was born in Venezuela. Her mother was communist. Her father is Argentine lawyer Alberto Trotta, who was a political prisoner, went into exile in 1975, spent time in Venezuela, and had his family while there. She obtained her law degree from the Central University of Venezuela, and two master's degrees from Brandeis University in Boston, where she was a Fulbright scholar. She has been living in Argentina since 2011.

Trotta Gamus specialized in human rights and international law. She was director of institutional programs for the Buenos Aires Province Chamber of Deputies, working for governor María Eugenia Vidal. She was also president of Alianza por Venezuela, a network of exiled Venezuelans, and was a diplomat to the Latin American Jewish Congress

== Personal life ==
She is a chavismo critic, saying that Hugo Chávez and Nicolás Maduro created a "narcostate". She is Jewish.
