= Plan País =

Political and economic plan by Juan Guaidó and the National Assembly of Venezuela

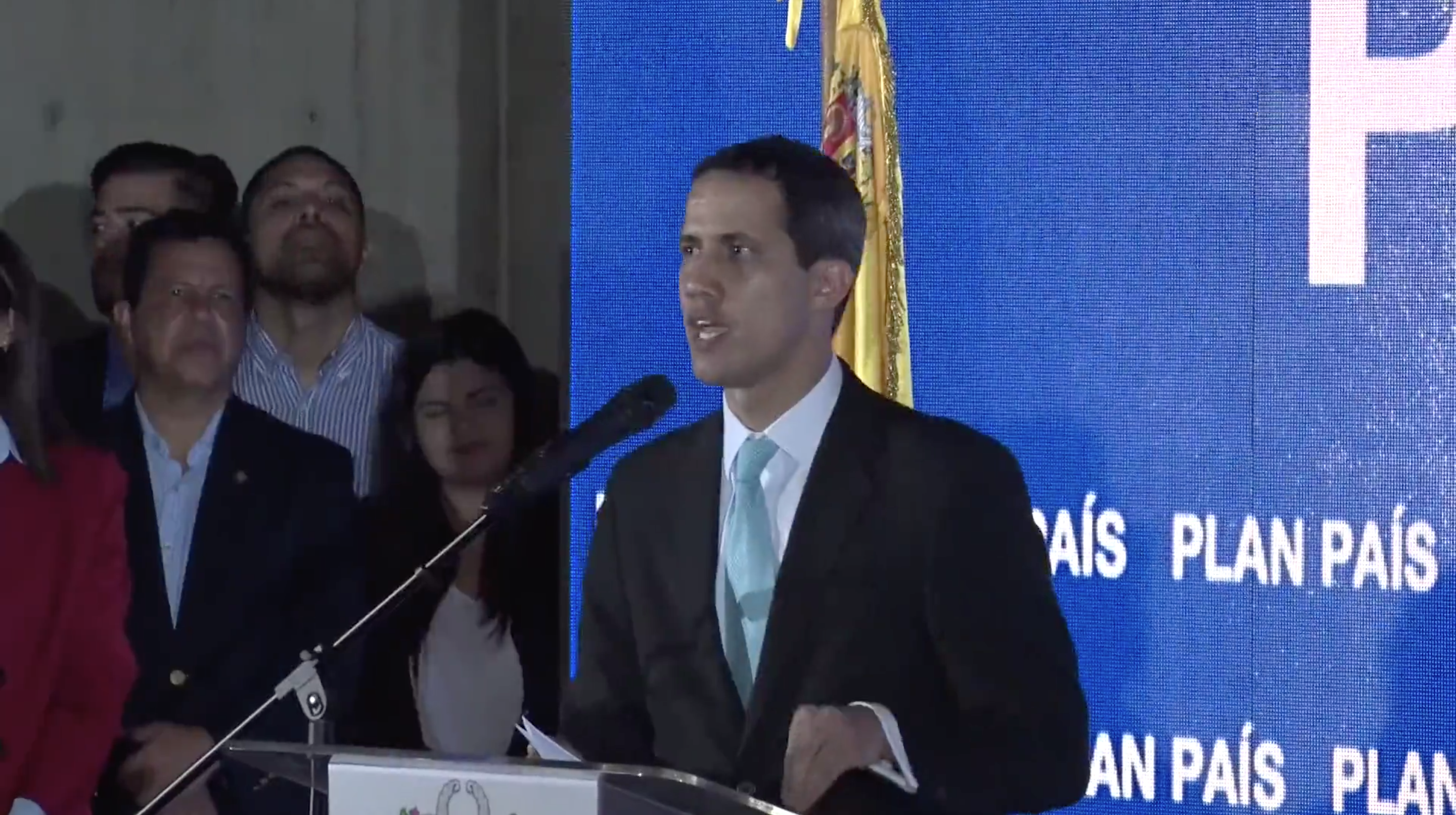
Juan Guaidó presenting Plan País Venezuela on 31 January 2019

Plan País Venezuela (English: Plan for the Country) is a plan organized by Juan Guaidó and the National Assembly of Venezuela created to revitalize Venezuela's economy, petroleum industry, and social sectors.

== Origins ==
Plan País Venezuela had been under elaboration for some time and was initially developed through a series of public and private meetings in the United States and Venezuela. Experts from all sectors were consulted, among them economist Ricardo Hausmann and politicians and diplomats including Leopoldo López, Julio Borges and Carlos Vecchio along with Guaidó. Guaidó has thanked his mentor Leopoldo López, stating that López's book, Venezuela Energética, had inspired the Plan País Venezuela project.

== Presentation ==
During the Venezuelan presidential crisis, Guaidó announced on 31 January that the National Assembly of Venezuela had approved a commission to further develop and implement the plan for the reconstruction of Venezuela, to be headed by Deputy Juan Andrés Mejía. The plan envisions providing government subsidies to the most vulnerable populations in Venezuela, restoring experienced personnel—removed by former President Hugo Chávez—to PDVSA (Venezuela's state-run petroleum company) and improving foreign investment. According to Guaidó, the aims of the plan are to "stabilize the economy, attend to the humanitarian emergency immediately, rescue public services, and overcome poverty." A response to Maduro's Plan de la Patria, it has provisions to revitalize PDVSA, restore the health sector and offer assistance to the most poverty-stricken.

Economic advisor José Guerra stated that to curtail hyperinflation in Venezuela the transitional government must remove fixed currency exchange rates, stop monetary inflation by limiting Venezuela's money supply and refinance foreign debt. Advisor Jose Toro estimated that Venezuela needed an investment of $30 billion for economic recovery. National Assembly legislator Ángel Alvarado stated: "We are not going to reduce spending, we are not going to live in austerity, we are going to an expansion program to reactivate the Venezuelan economy." Implementation of the plan requires the exit of Nicolás Maduro from the presidency.
