= Ana Medina =

Venezuelan ambassador

Venezuela Ambassador to Poland
- Incumbent
- Assumed office March 19, 2019
- President: Juan Guaidó

Ana Medina is the Venezuelan ambassador to Poland appointed by the National Assembly during the Venezuelan presidential crisis on 19 March 2019.

== See also ==
- Juan Guaidó
- Poland–Venezuela relations
