= Batiz =

Batiz or Bátiz may refer to:

== People with the surname ==
- András Batiz (born 1975), Hungarian news anchor and government spokesperson
- Baby Bátiz (born 1949), Mexican singer
- César Batiz, Venezuelan investigative journalist
- Enrique Bátiz (1942–2025), Mexican conductor and concert pianist
- Jesús Batiz (born 1999), Honduran professional footballer
- Jorge Bátiz (1933–2025), Argentinian cyclist
- Martha Bátiz (born 1971), Mexican-Canadian writer

== People with the given name ==
- Batiz Negol (died 1224), Hungarian nobleman

== Places ==
- Batiz, a village in Călan town, Hunedoara County, Romania
