= Segnini =

Segnin is a surname. Notable people with the surname include:

- Carolina Coto Segnini (fl. from 2006), Costa Rican model and actress
- Giannina Segnini (born 1970), Costa Rican journalist
- Vivian Segnini (born 1989), Brazilian tennis player
