= Chilling effect =

Discouragement of exercising rights by threats of legal sanctions

A chilling effect is the phenomenon in which an individual, organization, or group is prevented from exercising their legal rights, leading to self-censorship in the form of the restraint of information sharing or the abstinence from certain activities. This self-censorship is driven by the fear of potential repercussions and harm if actions are taken. In the absence of a legal context, the common use of coercion or threats of coercion (along with other undesirable consequences) can exert a chilling effect on a group of people regarding a specific behavior, and often can be statistically measured or be plainly observed. For example, the news headline "Flood insurance [price] spikes have chilling effect on some home sales," and the abstract title of a two-part survey of 160 college students involved in dating relationships: "The chilling effect of aggressive potential on the expression of complaints in intimate relationships."

== Law ==
In a legal context, a chilling effect is the inhibition or discouragement of the legitimate exercise of rights by the threat of legal sanction. A chilling effect may be caused by legal actions such as the passing of a law, the decision of a court, or the threat of a lawsuit; any legal action that would cause people to hesitate to exercise a legitimate right (freedom of speech or otherwise) for fear of legal repercussions. When that fear is brought about by the threat of a libel lawsuit, it is called libel chill. A lawsuit initiated specifically for the purpose of creating a chilling effect may be called a strategic lawsuit against public participation (SLAPP). "Chilling" in this context normally implies an undesirable slowing.

== History ==
In 1644 John Milton expressed the chilling effect of censorship in Areopagitica:

For to distrust the judgement and the honesty of one who hath but a common repute in learning and never yet offended, as not to count him fit to print his mind without a tutor or examiner, lest he should drop a schism or something of corruption, is the greatest displeasure and indignity to a free and knowing spirit that can be put upon him.

The term chilling effect has been in use in the United States since as early as 1950. The United States Supreme Court first refers to the "chilling effect" in the context of the United States Constitution in Wieman v. Updegraff in 1952.

It, however, became further used as a legal term when William J. Brennan, a justice of the United States Supreme Court, used it in a judicial decision (Lamont v. Postmaster General) which overturned a law requiring a postal patron receiving "communist political propaganda" to specifically authorize the delivery.

The Lamont case, however, did not center around a law that explicitly stifles free speech. The "chilling effect" referred to at the time was a "deterrent effect" on freedom of expression, even when there is no law explicitly prohibiting it. However, in general, the term "chilling effect" is also used in reference to laws or actions that may not explicitly prohibit legitimate speech, but rather impose undue burden on speech.

== Usage ==
In United States and Canadian law, the term chilling effects refers to the stifling effect that vague or excessively broad laws may have on legitimate speech activity.

However, the term is also now commonly used outside American legal jargon, such as the chilling effects of high prices or of corrupt police, or of "anticipated aggressive repercussions" in, for example, personal relationships.

A chilling effect is an effect that reduces, suppresses, discourages, delays, or infringes on a person's ability to freely express a view without fear on consequence.

An example of the "chilling effect" in Canadian case law can be found in Iorfida v. MacIntyre in which a party challenged the constitutionality of a criminal law prohibiting the publication of literature depicting illicit drug use. The court found that the law had a "chilling effect" on legitimate forms of expression and could stifle political debate on issues such as the legalization of marijuana. The court noted that it did not adopt the same "chilling effect" analysis used in American law but considered the chilling effect of the law as a part of its own analysis.

In the United States, Donald Trump's conflict with the media has been described as having a chilling effect.

== International community ==
In the international community, chilling effects typically are used to refer to government or political censorship on democratic systems and actors, including journalists/media, academic institutions, and judicial functions.

Chilling Effects in international law cases can be separated into "regulatory chill" or "chilling expressions" issues. The first refers to when a government or nation refrains from passing legislation or exercising their authority over their political territory in order to avoid repercussions from international actors and/or foreign investors. Threats of sanctioning or pulling out from investment, or dismantling trade deals are some of the ways regulatory chill can be achieved.

In 2011, the Australia government passed a law that required all tobacco products to be sold in plain packaging in an effort to reduce smoking by making cigarette packs less appealing. In November of that year, tobacco company Phillips Morris Asia sued Australia on the basis that the law harmed their business and broke trade agreement rules between Hong Kong and Australia. This type of lawsuit is known as investment arbitration.

At the same time, the New Zealand government was preparing to pass similar legislation but delayed it for six and a half years while waiting for the lawsuit to conclude, in fear it would also get sued by tobacco companies for similar reasoning.

In 2015, Australia won the case when the Permanent Court of Arbitration concluded that Phillip Morris had performed an “abuse of rights” and ordered the company to assume the cost of the trial. Following this verdict, New Zealand moved forward with their own packaging legislation.

In Poland, a set of disciplinary rules allowed the government to question or punish judges for their court decisions or for requesting guidance from the Court of Justice of the European Union. This system was found to violate EU law in the 2021 CJEU ruling Commission v Poland (C-791/19). The rules created a situation of pressure on judges to avoid actions that might lead to disciplinary steps, which legal scholars describe as a chilling effect. The risk of penalties, even without direct punishment, limited the independence of the judiciary and its authority.

=== Case studies ===
In 1999, Costa Rican journalist Mauricio Herrera-Ulloa was found guilty on four charges of defamation for a series of seven stories he published exposing a corruption scandal of Costa Rican Ambassador Felix Przedborski. In response, Przedborski filed criminal defamation and civil lawsuits against Herrera-Ulloa and La Nación, and in 1999, Herrera-Ulloa was convicted, ordered to pay damages, to publish parts of the ruling after taking down the original stories, and his name was also entered into the record of convicted felons.

In 2001, Herrera-Ulloa and La Nación’s publisher at the time, Fernán Vargas Rohrmoser appealed to the Inter-American Commission on Human Rights which found the court violated the journalist's right to freedom of expression. The commission urged Costa Rica to overturn the convictions, erase the criminal record, and restore the removed online content but when the country failed to comply, the case was brought before the Inter-American Court of Human Rights (IACtHR) in 2003 and eventually overturned in 2004.

Regarding Ömer Faruk Gergerlioğlu's case in Turkey, the Office of the United Nations High Commissioner for Human Rights (OHCHR) said that Turkey's mis-use of counter-terrorism measures can have a chilling effect on the enjoyment of fundamental freedoms and human rights.

=== Chilling effect of employer retaliation ===
Although speech may be constitutionally protected from being legally sanctioned by the government, employers in the U.S., for example, are generally free to fire employees who express opinions they disagree with or find offensive. The threat of the loss of employment as a consequence of expressing an opinion can have a chilling effect on speech, even on speech that occurs outside the workplace.

== See also ==
- Censorship
- Culture of fear
- Cancel culture
- Democratic backsliding
- Fear mongering
- Judicial misconduct
- Lawfare
- Malicious prosecution
- Media transparency
- Opinion corridor
- Paper terrorism
- Political prisoner
- Prior restraint
- Vexatious litigation
