= Casitas del Sur case =

Unresolved child disappearances in Mexico

The location of shelters.

The Casitas del Sur case refers to the disappearance of several minors from children's refuges operated by the religious organization Iglesia Cristiana Restaurada (Restored Christian Church).

The case is a reference to the private Mexico City shelter 'Casitas del Sur' from which 126 children were rescued in January 2009. In addition to the 'Casitas del Sur' shelter, minors were reported missing from Centro de Adaptación e Integración Familiar A.C. (CAIFAC) in Monterrey, Nuevo León and from "La Casita" in Cancún, Quintana Roo. As of March 2012, fourteen children remained missing.

The missing children are allegedly abducted for religious indoctrination, illegal adoptions, organ trafficking, and trafficking of children. The Attorney General of Mexico offers a $1.2 million reward for information leading to the location and recovery of the missing children.

The case is the subject of the book Se venden niños by investigative journalist Sanjuana Martínez. La Jornada journalist Carlos Martínez García was granted protective measures after receiving threats for his report on the case.

== Ilse Michell ==
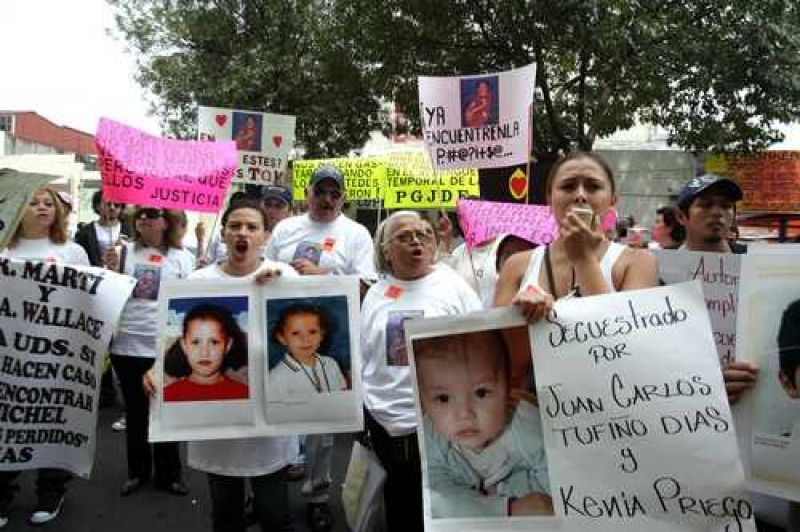
A rally for the missing children.

The case became more publicized in late 2008 when ten-year-old Ilse Michel Curiel Martínez was not found in the Casitas del Sur shelter. In 2005 Martinez was taken to a temporary shelter of the Mexico City Attorney General's Office (PGJDF) due to an alleged case of domestic violence.

She was sent to the Casitas del Sur shelter while the case was settled in the court. When the charges were dropped, the judge requested the release of the minor to her grandmother but shelter staff rejected the request. On 31 October 2008, government officials went to the property to request the release of the minor, but their entry was denied. After obtaining a search warrant, police entered the facility to look for the minor but were unable to find her.

Police suspect the minor had been transferred to the state of Morelos. Local PAN congressman Agustín Castilla Marroquín filed a criminal complaint against the director of the temporary shelter, Lorena González, that transferred Ilse Michell to Casitas del Sur and demanded that she be relieved of her duties for her possible involvement in the case. González denied having transferred the child to Casitas del Sur, saying it was the responsibility of the district attorney's office.

When a second girl was reported missing on 27 January 2009, Castilla Marroquín charged public officials with negligence and complicity, saying personnel from the District Attorney's office warned the shelter of the searches so that the minors could be removed from the facilities.

== Rescued children ==
On 29 January 2009 when at least four parents complained of being forbidden to see their children, over 30 unarmed police officers, social workers, and staff from the Human Rights Commission entered two Casitas del Sur facilities disguised as nurses to confuse shelter staff and to prevent the children from panicking. Seven shelter employees objected with shouts to the release of the minors, causing the children to go on a frenzy, screaming, crying, and chanting apocalyptic phrases and accusing their rescuers of being corrupt.

The children repeated phrases such as "Here only the almighty God exists, and here it all ends", leading officials to believe that the minors were encouraged to participate in a mass suicide. Police believed the children were subjected to severe religious indoctrination and transferred the 126 minors to the National System for Integral Family Development to undergo medical and psychological studies.

The children were reluctant to provide information to psychologists. Officials discovered that children received no outside schooling and were forced to participate in long hours of prayer. A rescued girl initially identified herself as Martinez, but later identified as another minor. DNA tests performed on the minor gave a negative result. The seven shelter employees with arrested and charged with obstruction of justice.

On 6 June 2014 Ilse Michel arrived alone in a taxi to the offices of the National System for Integral Family Development in Ecatepec, Mexico. She reunited with her grandmother after spending five years with a couple who told her she had been abandoned. As of March 2014, eight children remain missing.
