= 2020 Venezuelan National Assembly Delegated Committee election =

- Sunday, 5 January 2020
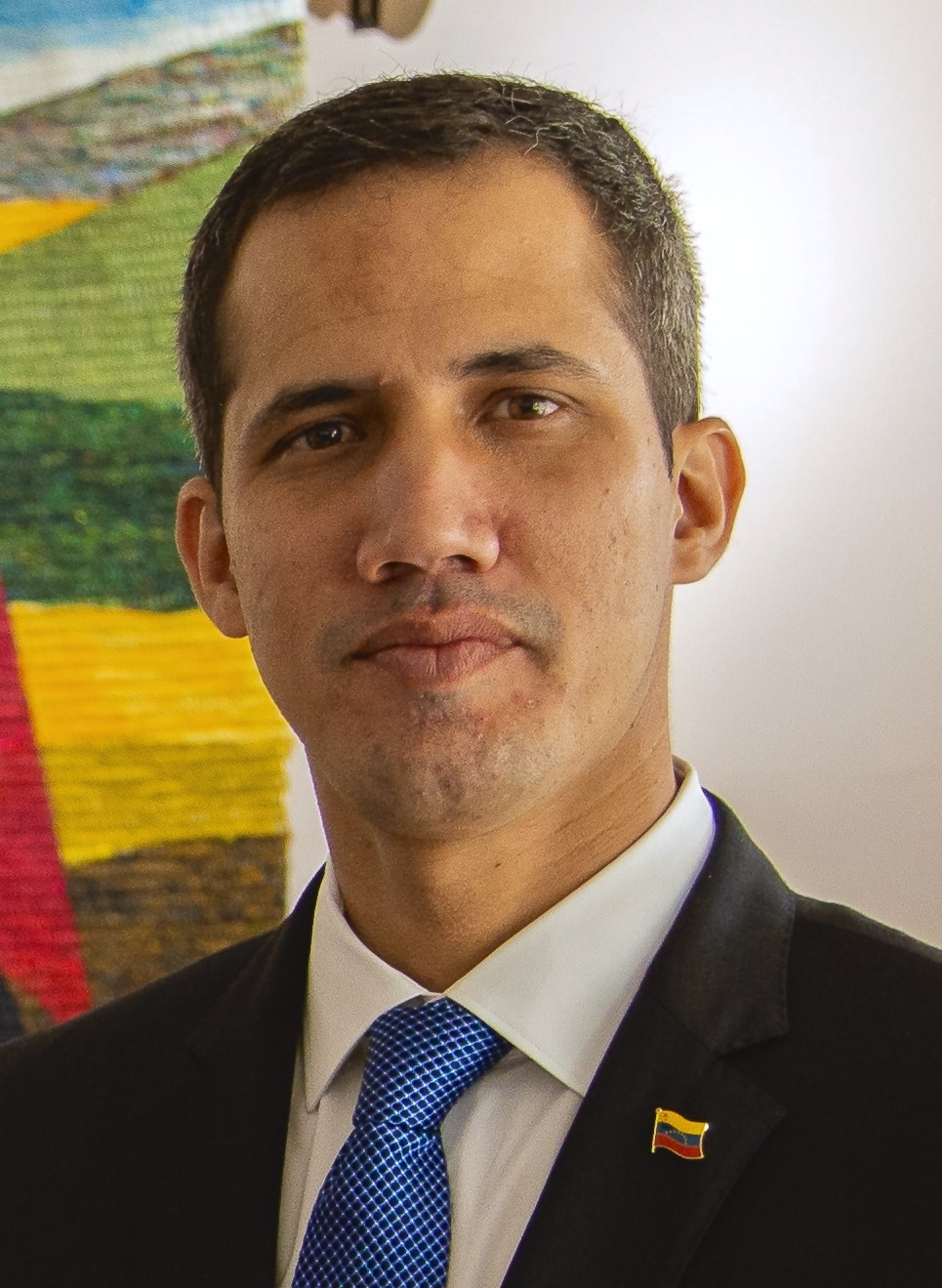

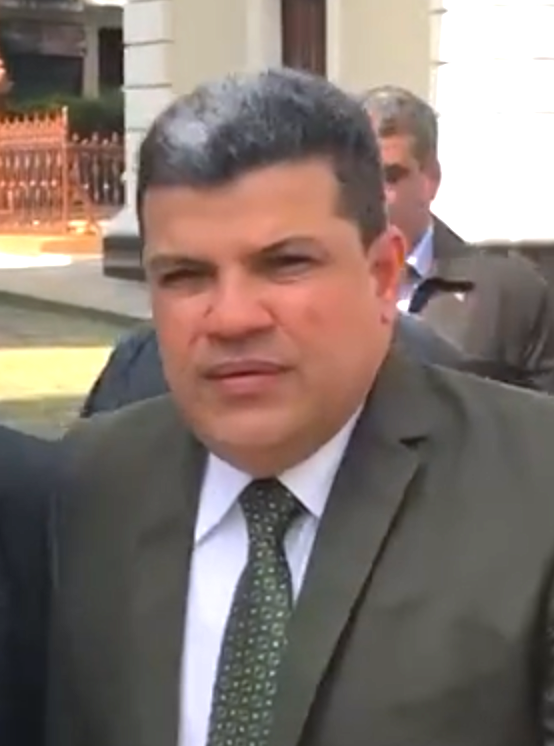
Candidate	Juan Guaidó	Luis Parra (Note: Parra announced his candidacy by surprise on the day of the election.)
Party	Popular Will (Note: In his victory speech, Guaidó announced his resignation from Popular Will.)	Independent
President of the National Assembly before election
Juan Guaidó
Popular Will
Elected President of the National Assembly
Disputed

The 2020 Venezuelan National Assembly Delegated Committee election was to be held in the ordinary session of the National Assembly on 5 January, in which 160 deputies were to elect the legislature's board of directors for the year 2020–21: the president, the first and second vice presidents, the secretary and the deputy secretary. It was the last such election of the IV National Assembly.

The election was disrupted by the security forces physically preventing some opposition members, including Juan Guaidó, as well as members of the media, from entering the National Assembly building in Caracas. The result was two competing claims to the presidency of the legislature: one by Luis Parra, an independent legislator, and one by Guaidó, a legislator from the Popular Will party and a claimant to the country's disputed presidency. Parra was formerly a member of Justice First, but was expelled from the party on 20 December 2019, based on corruption allegations, which he denied. Inside the legislature, Parra was declared president. The opposition disputed this outcome, saying that there had not been a quorum and that the votes had not been counted. Later in the day, a separate session took place at the El Nacional newspaper building, where 100 of the 167 deputies voted to re-elect Guaidó as president. Guaidó took an oath of office at a session on 7 January after forcing his way into the building through police barricades. On the same date, Parra reiterated his claim to the presidency.

As of January 2020, Russia is the only foreign government to have officially recognized Luis Parra's presidency, while the United States, Canada, and most European and Latin American countries have recognized Guaido's re-election.

== Voting system ==
Article 194 of the Venezuelan Constitution reads:

Artículo 194. La Asamblea Nacional elegirá de su seno un Presidente o Presidenta y dos Vicepresidentes o Vicepresidentas, un Secretario o Secretaria y un Subsecretario o Subsecretaria fuera de su seno, por un período de un año. El Reglamento establecerá las formas de suplir las faltas temporales y absolutas

Translation:

Article 194. The National Assembly shall elect from its core a President and two Vice-Presidents, a Secretary and a Deputy Secretary, for a period of one year. The Regulation will establish ways to replace temporary and absolute absences

=== Distance voting ===
On 17 December 2019, the National Assembly approved the modification of the Interior and Debate Regulations, specifically section 4, article 13 and articles 43 and 56, so that deputies who are exiled can vote from their country of residence. The proposal, presented by Democratic Action deputy Dennis Fernández and approved by 93 deputies, includes the admission of information and communication technologies (ICT) to guarantee the quorum and the discussions. The deputies of the United Socialist Party of Venezuela withdrew from the session and did not vote. They were joined by deputies José Brito, Conrado Pérez and Luis Parra, all former militants, representing Justice First. The Supreme Tribunal of Justice declared the modification void, since, according to Juan José Mendoza, president of the Constituent National Assembly, the reform had no "legal effect" when it would "collide" with the provisions of the Constitution. The opposition reported that the system would be used anyway.

== Predictions ==
The incumbent president of the National Assembly, Juan Guaidó, announced he would run for re-election at the parliament headquarters, amid doubts about whether he would get the necessary votes (84). Guaidó received support in his re-election as president from 27 political parties, including those with parliamentary representation: Encuentro Ciudadano, Voluntad Popular, Acción Democrática, Un Nuevo Tiempo, Primero Justicia, La Causa R and a faction of Copei.

Guaidó said that he had enough votes for his reelection, even without a distance vote from the thirty deputies abroad or in hiding, citing as evidence the fact that the modification of the internal and debate rules had been approved with 93 votes, more than the 84 needed.

The 16 de Julio (16 July) group, made up of Vente Venezuela and Convergencia, led by deputy Biagio Pilieri, did not offer details on who they would vote for in the 5 January election. They said they would respect the February 2016 governance agreement, which says that the presidency of the National Assembly would correspond to minority parties.

Alternate deputy of Juan Pablo Guanipa, José Sánchez "Mazuco", announced in the day of the election that he was operated and hospitalized, so he would not be able to attend to the session, but assured that his vote would not make a difference since the main deputy Guanipa would attend instead.

== Background ==
=== Operación Alacrán and Armando.info investigation ===
In November 2019, deputy José Guerra denounced a strategy to "bribe" opposition lawmakers in what he called "Green Suitcase", with the aim of breaking the qualified majority that the opposition had in the National Assembly.

On 1 December, the website Armando.info published an investigation reporting that nine parliamentaries mediated in favor of two businessmen linked with the government. After the investigation was published, the deputies Luis Parra, José Brito, Conrado Pérez and José Gregorio "Goyo" Noriega were removed from their positions in Justice First and Popular Will.

The Venezuelan opposition alleged that they were targeted by what they described as a "campaign of bribery and intimidation" by Nicolás Maduro's government in December 2019. Venezuelan lawmakers and the United States State Department said that opposition deputies, in parties led or allied with Guaidó, were being offered up to US$1 million to not vote for him. Luis Parra and other opposition deputies were removed from their parties following allegations that they were being bribed by Maduro. National Assembly deputies Ismael León and Luis Stefanelli directly accused Parra in December 2019 of attempting to bribe deputies to vote against Guaidó. Parra denied the allegations and said he was open to being investigated for corruption. Weeks prior to his investigation, Parra openly shared support for Guaidó and promoted his protest movement.

Deputy Delsa Solórzano accused Nicolás Maduro on CNN Radio Argentina of directing the operation. According to her, the government resorted to this method after failing to incarcerate or suspend the parliamentary immunity of the deputies, denouncing a considerable increase of political persecution as 5 January was approaching, explaining that security forces have gone to the houses of many deputies without alternates, and the only one with one, according to Solórzano, did accept the bribe.

On 3 January 2020, Nicmer Evans, a Caracas-based analyst, alleged that Maduro had managed to cause 14 deputies to not cast a vote for Guaidó through these tactics. Guaidó theoretically controlled 112 seats in the Assembly at the time, needing 84 votes to win.

=== Arrest and indictments ===
Additionally, the deputy Juan Requesens, who has been detained as a political prisoner since August 2018, had visitation rights removed for the day of the election, according to his sister Rafaela. In December 2019, deputy Gilber Caro was also arrested with no charges.

== Events and contested results ==
=== Raid of deputies' hotel ===
In the early morning of 5 January, members of the police and intelligence service entered Paseo Las Mercedes, a hotel in which many opposition deputies were staying. The officials said that they found explosive devices in the hotel.

=== Blockade of the Parliament ===
Bolivarian National Guard blocking the vicinity of the National Assembly of Venezuela

In the morning, deputies started passing the many entry checkpoints of the Legislative Federal Palace. There was a moment were the National Guard started allowing the entry one by one. Opposition deputies denounced that the officials were deliberately slowing down the entry, and many lawmakers spoke with the minority leader, Francisco Torrealba, to intercede, who went out several times. There was a moment where the opposition deputies in the last checkpoint were not allowed to enter. Guaidó and other opposition deputies were blocked from entering by the Bolivarian National Guard.

Journalists were also impeded from covering the event. Security forces only allowed entry to reporters whose names appeared in a list provided by Maduro's Ministry of Information. State-run media was allowed to enter the building. About 35 of the national and international media outlets accredited by the National Assembly to cover the legislative sessions were not allowed entry. The Venezuelan Press Workers Union published a list of nearly forty outlets that were denied entry to the National Assembly.

Some diplomatic representatives, including from Germany, the Netherlands, and Spain, were denied entry as well, and the delegates from Chile and Mexico were the only ones allowed access.

Guaidó being prevented from entering the Legislative Federal Palace by the Bolivarian National Guard

After 11:00 am (VET), when the session was scheduled to have started, the pro-government deputies inside the session chamber started chanting "let the session begin". After chanting, singing, and taking pictures, the deputies simulated the election of a new parliament leadership, jokingly appointing Óscar Figuera, deputy of the Communist Party of Venezuela, as "self-proclaimed" president of the Assembly. Figuera pronounced a speech and joked that the appointed group would be transitional, since a new leadership would be appointed in short.

Deputy Nirma Guarulla was blocked from entering and had her parliamentary credential snatched away, and deputies Delsa Solórzano and Nora Bracho were assaulted after attempting to enter. A rumor spread that Gilberto Sojo, alternate deputy of Gaby Arellano that had precautionary measures, could be arrested, causing Guaidó to decide to stay next to him. These events led to Guaidó to refuse when the National Guard asked him to enter if the remaining deputies, around twenty, did not enter. However, the officials never opened the entry access to him or asked for his credential, and on the contrary, reinforced the security in the perimeter. Guaidó and the other opposition deputies were blocked from entering by the National Guard afterwards. Guaidó tried to climb over a fence around the building, but was pushed back by members of the National Guard.

=== Luis Parra declares himself president ===
Briefly before the session started, outside the Legislative Palace, José Brito postulated Luis Parra as an alternative candidate to Guaidó, as well as Franklyn Duarte and José Gregorio Noriega as first and second vicepresidents, respectively.

Francisco Torrealba assured that when Guaidó did not arrive at the scheduled time to open the session, the deputies inside the legislative chamber applied the Internal and Debate Rules, establishing that the oldest deputy would assume the Assembly Chair to moderate the election of a new leadership.

Luis Parra, who was granted access to the legislative palace before, announced by surprise that he would be appointed as president of the National Assembly. The diplomatic delegates that were present withdrew. Pro-government and opposition deputies started stepping up to the tribune and arguing, and deputies José Brito and Marcos Bozo had a scuffle. A group of men accompanied by pro-government deputies Nosliw Rodríguez and Ileana Medina tried to open the sound control room of the session chamber forcefully, kicking the door, while deputy María Beatriz Martínez tried to prevent it.

United Socialist Party of Venezuela (PSUV) deputies gave instructions to Parra, Franklyn Duarte and José Gregorio Noriega, assuring that there was quorum for the appointment and asking him to take the offices of the Assembly's Chair. Francisco Torrealba instructed Parra to remain seated and to call the secretary. Other PSUV deputies handed a megaphone to Parra to let him speaker, and when they managed to enter into the sound control room they let him know that the chamber had sound he could use the microphones.

Luis Parra announced himself president of the National Assembly. Franklyn Duarte and José Gregorio Noriega were named first and second vice president of the National Assembly, respectively. Negal Morales was named secretary of the National Assembly. The quorum was not confirmed, and contrary to Article 8 of the Internal and Debate Rules, the vote for each position did not take place.

Speaking to reporters, Parra said that 140 lawmakers were present at his session, and that he had been elected with 81 votes. Pedro Carreño, a ruling party deputy, told AFP that there were 150 deputies present and that Parra received 84 votes, the exact majority needed to win. Nicolás Maduro recognized Parra as the new president of the National Assembly, saying that "there was a rebellion inside the National Assembly" and that "the National Assembly has made a decision". Regarding the controversy of the opposition attempting to enter the Palacio Federal Legislativo, Maduro said "if the failed Guaidó did not want to enter it was because he did not have the votes", dismissing that Guaidó and his supporters were prevented from entering. Parra told state media that they started the session before Guaidó arrived, which is why he was not there. Francisco Torrealba described the proclamation as "unusual", but "valid" and "historic".

The opposition said that the election did not achieve quorum, and that Parra declared himself president without any votes counted. When reporters asked Parra for the official tally of votes–usually released the same the day–he said that it "was not available" and there was not a date for its release.

=== Opposition election ===
After being blocked from entering the Palacio Federal Legislativo, Guaidó announced that a separate session of the National Assembly would happen in the building of El Nacional, a Venezuelan newspaper. National Assembly deputies signed their names on an attendance list upon entering the facility.

Stalin González, appointed as incidental secretary, explained that there were two attendance lists: the first one being that of those who could not start the session in the Legislative Federal Palace, 127 deputies, meaning that there was quorum but they were not allowed to enter. In the second list there also was quorum.

At the session, Guaidó was re-elected president of the National Assembly; there were 111 total votes from deputies, with 100 approving of Guaidó being reappointed president. Juan Pablo Guanipa and Carlos Berrizbeitia were elected as first and second vice-presidents, respectively, taking oath at the scene.

During Guaidó speech, he announced his resignation from Popular Will to secure more autonomy in his actions.

Several deputies abroad followed and endorsed the vote remotely from Madrid, Spain.

== Media censorship ==
State communications service CANTV reportedly blocked access to social media sites Twitter, Facebook, Instagram, and YouTube on the day of the election. Block tracking website NetBlocks reported that the block began as the National Assembly session did, criticizing this.

== Aftermath ==
The 16 July group, which previously said that they would vote based on the February 2016 governance agreement, voted to appoint Guaidó as president of the National Assembly after Parra's proclamation.

After Parra's proclamation, Negal Morales, Parra's-appointed-secretary, tweeted:

#AsambleaNacional aún sin quórum, y sin la mayoría de los parlamentarios en el hemiciclo, hoy decidimos tomar la @AsambleaVE por la fuerza, en alianza con el Psuv y @NicolasMaduro para lograr un cambio en Venezuela, con participación de todos. Pedimos al pueblo su respaldo!

Translation:

#NationalAssembly still without quorum, and without the majority of the parliamentarians in the chamber, today we decided to take over the @AsambleaVE by force, in alliance with the PSUV and @NicolasMaduro to accomplish a change in Venezuela, with the participation of everyone. We ask support to the people!

— Twitter, 5 January 2020

The tweet was deleted and Morales later tweeted that the statement was false, but the tweet was archived in Wayback Machine before being deleted along with several responses about an hour after being published.

The COPEI party announced that deputies Franklyn Duarte and Manuel González would be sent to the party's disciplinary council for their involvement in Parra's proclamation. Franklyn Duarte was subsequently expelled from COPEI on 6 January 2020.

=== Follow-up session and re-investiture of Guaidó ===
Juan Guaidó's vote tally

On 7 January, Luis Parra and his allies started a legislative session on the national gas shortages. Parra started the meeting without the attendance figures that are ordinarily required to start a session. Guaidó and other opposition lawmakers were prevented from entering due to police barricades. Parra's session was stopped as opposition lawmakers forced their way in, and Parra was seen running away from the Legislative Palace as the opposition deputies entered. After electricity was cut in the parliament, Guaidó initiated a new parliamentary session and was sworn in to continue his role as president of the National Assembly. When leaving the parliament, security forces fired gas canisters. Some journalists and opposition lawmakers denounced being injured and robbed by armed civilian militias. After these events, Parra reaffirmed his claim to the presidency of National Assembly.

=== Sanctions by the United States ===
The United States Department of the Treasury sanctioned seven individuals, "who, at the bidding of Maduro, attempted to block the democratic process in Venezuela", according to US Secretary of Treasury Steven Mnuchin on 13 January 2020. The sanctioned have their assets in the US frozen and are not allowed to do business with US financial markets nor with US citizens. The list includes the members of Parra's appointed board of directors and his supporters: Franklyn Duarte, José Gregorio Noriega, Negal Morales, José Brito, Conrado Pérez, Adolfo Superlano and Luis Parra himself.

Hours later, Maduro's Foreign Minister Jorge Arreaza published a statement saying that the sanctions imposed by the US Treasury seek to "interfere and undermine the proper functioning of democratic institutions, with the unusual intention to designate from Washington the authorities of the legislative power". The statement also argues that these tactics are "contrary to international law and undermine the stability, peace and self-determination of the Venezuelan people".

=== Investigation on Parra's tally ===
A report on the tally of votes–usually released the same the day of an election–was not available after Parra's took oath. On 13 January 2020, Venezuela's Supreme Tribunal of Justice (TSJ) ordered Parra's Board of Directors to submit the tally of votes and proof of quorum. The TSJ gave it five days to provide the report and ruled that provisionally, both Parra and Guaidó, as well as the vice-speaker designates declared by both sides, would enjoy legal immunity. The TSJ did not ask for Guaidó's tally. Ten days after the oath, the report was still missing. When asked, Parra's has given several versions on why the report is unavailable, including that the report might have been stolen.

The TSJ ruled in favor of Parra on 25 May 2020, who it recognizes as the sole president of the National Assembly.

=== Justice First complaint ===
On 16 January, José Brito and Conrado Pérez filed a complaint in the Supreme Tribunal of Justice against the leadership of Justice First, the party they were expelled from. The deputies asked to be restituted in the party, saying that there was no justification to be expelled from Justice First and their due process, right of defense and presumption of innocence. They also asked the high court to appoint a new leadership "that was in Venezuela", since the current one was in exile, and to summon new internal elections.

The deputies were received by the president of the Constitutional Chamber and the meeting lasted a little more than an hour. Outside the Supreme Tribunal, a group of around two hundred people met in support of the deputies. El Pitazo reported that earlier in the morning, some persons were handing out shirts of the party, most apparently new. Several demonstrators interviewed by the outlet expressed ignoring the reasons of the meeting or the contents of the complaint introduced. In some cases, they affirmed having been taken by bus, could not say for long they were part of Justice First, did not know that Luis Parra was not present or declared being paid for assisting. The party's secretary general, Tomás Guanipa, declared that the deputies sought to give the party's electoral card to Nicolás Maduro.

=== Disrupted sessions and attacks on deputies ===
Guaidó called for a rally to follow him to a parliamentary session to be held on 11 January, but after security forces barricaded the parliament the session was held in the headquarters of El Nacional.

Security forces returned to barricade the legislative palace in follow-up session scheduled by Guaidó on 15 January. Colectivos, pro-Maduro civilian paramilitary groups, appeared on the scene and attacked the caravan of the lawmakers that tried to reach parliament. Gunshots were heard and a car carrying lawmakers, transporting Guaido's vicepresident Berrizbeitia, got its windows shattered, but no injuries were reported. Guaidó decried what he called an "ambush against the Federal Palace". The session was moved to El Hatillo Municipality in Caracas. Diosdado Cabello, president of Constituent National Assembly, a different legislative body, congratulated colectivos for "defending these spaces belonging to the Bolivarian Revolution".

Opposition deputies were denied entry to parliament for a third time by security forces and colectivos on 21 January. Guaidó's headquarters were raided afterwards by intelligence SEBIN forces. The same day, an opposition deputy, Ismael León, was arrested by Venezuelan special police forces FAES, according to members of Popular Will. FAES operations usually focus on poor neighborhoods and the squad was accused of carrying out thousands of extrajudicial killings by the United Nations. This arrest, alongside Caro's arrest in November 2019, would be the first two times that FAES deals with public figures.

In March, the United Nations High Commissioner for Human Rights, Michelle Bachelet, in an updated report of human right violations in Venezuela, expressed concerns on the arrested lawmakers, Gilber Caro and Ismael León.

=== Protests ===
Several thousands of Venezuelans, led by Guaidó, carried a rally with the objective to take back the Parliament on 10 March 2020. The march was halted by security forces that blocked the roads and fired tear gas to disperse the crowd. Tuesday legislative session was later carried by opposition lawmakers in Las Mercedes's square in Caracas. After the rally, special police forces, raided an hotel and detained three lawmakers that were staying there; (Note: The lawmakers detained are Ángel Torres, Zandra Castillo and Renzo Prieto. The first two were later released, while Renzo Prieto was taken by the police.) two of them were later released according to congress. Maduro administration called a counter-protest the same day, a rally that was attended by hundreds of red-shirted supporters. Protests were canceled due to COVID-19 pandemic in Venezuela.

== Reactions ==
=== Domestic ===
- Vice President Delcy Rodríguez told US Vice President Mike Pence to "abstain from your vulgar interference and address the serious problems suffered by your country caused by the irrational warmongering" and that the "United States cannot impose its arrogance on the decisions that only belong to sovereign Venezuela." Her statement comes after Pence congratulated Guaido on his reelection.
- Maduro's Foreign Minister Jorge Arreaza rejected the "vulgar interventionism" of Donald Trump in the election of the parliament's leadership. Arreaza also told to Mike Pompeo that "your strategy against Venezuela failed, as well as losing the main puppet (referring to Juan Guaidó).
- The United Socialist Party of Venezuela (PSUV), the ruling political party, has called for demonstrations on 14 January in support of Luis Parra and rejecting the violence "committed by right-wing sectors of the opposition" at the National Assembly on 5 January.
- Javier Bertucci, president of the Esperanza por El Cambio party and former presidential candidate, proposed to repeat the elections with the participation of all the deputies, diplomatic representatives and journalists.
- Movimiento Estudiantil confirmed their support for Juan Guaidó, condemned Parra's proclamation and assured that they would accompany the deputies for the scheduled parliamentary section on 7 January. Guaidó endorsed the call to assist by the Student Movement.
- The members of the Constitutional Law Faculty of the Central University of Venezuela (UCV) described in a press conference the vote where Guaidó was elected as "legal and legitimate". Its director, Tulio Álvarez, warned and advised that the National Assembly had to declare a "parliamentary emergency" as possible, which is established in the Internatal and Debates Rules of the Assembly and based on the aggressions that the Assembly has suffered since 2015 and that his Faculty had documented.
- The presidency of the Episcopal Conference of Venezuela warned that Luis Parra's election was "a new manifestation of the totalitarian ideology of those who hold political power. They have promoted and protected the non-recognition of the lack of autonomy of the legitimate National Assembly; and, at the same time, they intend to recognize leadership invalidly elected against all constitutional legality".

=== International ===
==== UN member states ====
- Argentina: Foreign Minister Felipe Solá tweeted: "Forcibly preventing the functioning of the national assembly means condemning oneself to international isolation".
- Austria Chancellor Sebastian Kurz reaffirmed Austria's support for Guaido, stating that his calls for free and fair presidential elections to restore democracy is crucial.
- Bolivia: Foreign Minister Karen Longaric rejected the "manipulation and intervention of Nicolás Maduro" and reiterated its support to Juan Guaidó. Interim president Jeanine Áñez strongly rejected the intervention of the Maduro regime against the National Assembly of Venezuela and reiterated support for Guaido and its members.
- Canada: Foreign Minister François-Philippe Champagne condemned that security forces did not allow deputies to meet in the National Assembly.
- Brazil: Foreign Minister Ernesto Araújo accused Maduro of forcefully preventing Guaidó's re-election and tweeted "Brazil will not recognize any outcome of this violence and this affront to democracy".
- Chile: Foreign Minister Teodoro Ribera condemned the "intimidatory acts" of "Maduro's dictatorship" against opposition deputies.
- Colombia: Foreign Ministry rejected Parra's proclamation, considering the process as "fraudulent" and without guarantees and condemning that it was done without the presence of Guaidó and other opposition deputies.
- Costa Rica: Foreign Ministry "strongly condemns violence against democracy in Venezuela".
- Czech Republic: Foreign Minister Tomáš Petříček supported Guaido's reelection and stated that actions against a democratically elected National Assembly constitute another violation of the rule of law.
- Ecuador: President Lenín Moreno condemned the "abuse" against Guaidó at the National Assembly and expressed his support for the opposition.
- Georgia: Foreign Minister David Zalkaliani congratulated Guaido on his reelection and condemned unlawful acts against democracy and Constitution of Venezuela as "unacceptable".
- Germany: The German Foreign Office congratulated Guaido on his reelection. It has also urged the Maduro regime to respect the democratic rights of the National Assembly of Venezuela.
- Japan: The Government of Japan reaffirmed its support of Juan Guaidó as interim president of Venezuela. It also expressed concern about acts against democracy in the country.
- Mexico: Foreign Ministry urged Venezuela to democratically decide the leadership of the National Assembly "in accordance with the constitution".
- Netherlands: Foreign Minister Stef Blok welcomed the reelection of Guaido and reaffirmed that the Kingdom "supports Guaido's efforts for a peaceful solution to the crisis in Venezuela".
- Paraguay: Foreign Minister Antonio Rivas condemned the "violent repression" against opposition deputies.
- Russia: Foreign Ministry considered the "new leadership of parliament to be the result of a legitimate democratic procedure conducive to the return of the Venezuelan political struggle to the constitutional field".
- United Kingdom: Foreign & Commonwealth Office reiterated its support to Juan Guaidó as interim president of Venezuela and condemned the actions taken by Maduro's government to "frustrate the democratic process of the Venezuelan National Assembly on 5 January".
- United States: Secretary of State Mike Pompeo congratulated Juan Guaidó's re-election and condemned "the failed efforts of the former Maduro regime to negate the will of the democratically elected National Assembly". Vice President Mike Pence called Guaido congratulating him on his reelection and reaffirmed his "support to the Venezuelan people". The US government later implemented sanctions against Luis Parra and six of his parliamentary backers.
- Uruguay: Both the incumbent and the recently elected administration decried Maduro's government actions. President-elect Luis Lacalle Pou described it as a "new coup to democratic institutions".

==== Non-UN member states ====
- Kosovo: Foreign Minister and Deputy Prime Minister Behgjet Pacolli congratulated Guaido on his re-election according to the Venezuelan constitution. Pacolli reaffirmed its support to him and the Venezuelan people for its calls to restore democracy & prosperity.
- Taiwan: Taiwan's Minister of Foreign Affairs (MOFA) congratulated Guaidó and reiterated its support for free elections in Venezuela. The ministry says that Taiwan is ready to work with like-minded partners in further assisting the people restore the country's democracy & prosperity.

==== Supranational bodies ====
- United Nations: Secretary General António Guterres ask "to lower tensions and to work towards a peaceful and sustainable solution to the political crisis".
- OAS: The General Secretariat welcomed the re-election of the "interim President and President of the National Assembly Juan Guaidó" and "reiterates its condemnation of the fraudulent attempt to strip Juan Guaidó, with the use of violence and intimidation, of his powers as interim President of Venezuela and President of the National Assembly of the country".
- International Contact Group on Venezuela: In a joint statement from 12 countries of the Contact Group on Venezuela (not including Mexico and Uruguay), reiterated its support for Juan Guaidó as leader of the National Assembly and considered Parra's election as illegitimate and undemocratic.
- Lima Group: The Lima Group (except for Argentina and Mexico) backed Juan Guaidó re-election and condemned the "force and intimidation tactics" against the deputies.
- European Union: Peter Stano, Foreign Affairs and Security Policy spokesperson, catalogued the "irregularities" as "not acceptable" and "not compatible" with Venezuelan law. The European Union (EU) said on 6 January 2020 that it would continue to engage with Guaidó "and other representatives of the outgoing National Assembly" but did not explicitly use the term "interim president" as it has in the past, which was interpreted by an analyst from the Washington Office on Latin America as a sign of cooling international support for Guaidó, although an EU official said that there had been no change in policy. The European Parliament affirmed its support for Guaidó on 16 January. The EU confirmed its recognition of Guaidó in June 2020 in response to the TSJ confirmation of Parra. The EU "considers that the voting session that led to the 'election' of Luis Parra was not legitimate", EU Foreign Affairs chief Josep Borrell said.

== Public opinion ==
According to a survey carried out by Datanálisis in early February 2020: 39% of Venezuelans consider that there is a legitimate National Assembly presided by Juan Guaidó, 36% consider that there is no legitimate National Assembly for the moment, 16% does not know or does not answer and 10% consider that there is a legitimate National Assembly presided by Luis Parra.

== See also ==
- Operación Alacrán
- Storming of the Venezuelan National Congress
- 2017 Venezuelan National Assembly attack
