= Luis Parra =

Venezuelan politician (born 1978)

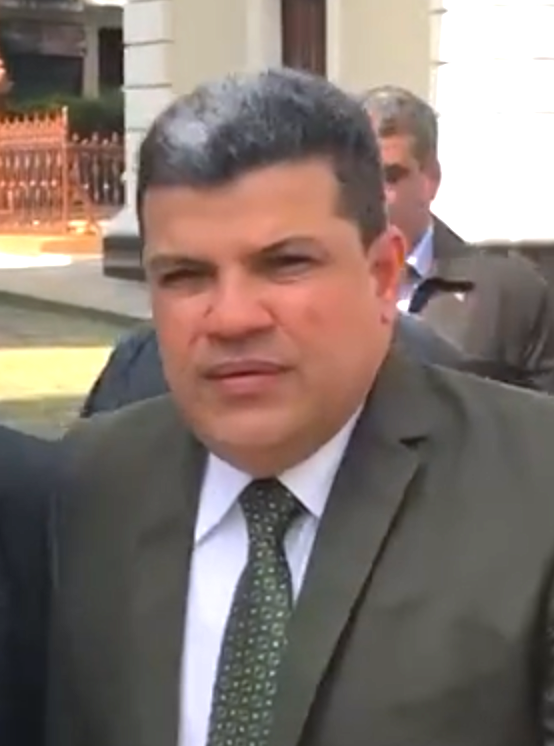
- Parra in 2020

Member of the National Assembly of Venezuela
- Incumbent
- Assumed office 5 January 2016
- Constituency: Yaracuy (2016-2021); National List (since 2021)

11th President of the National Assembly of Venezuela (contested)
- In office 5 January 2020 – 5 January 2021
- Preceded by: Juan Guaidó
- Succeeded by: Jorge Rodríguez

Personal details
- Born: Luis Eduardo Parra Rivero; 7 July 1978 (age 48) Independencia Municipality, Yaracuy, Venezuela
- Party: Venezuela First (since September 2020); Independent (December 2019–September 2020); Justice First (until December 2019)

Luis Eduardo Parra Rivero (born 7 July 1978) is a Venezuelan politician who was in a dispute with Juan Guaidó for a year over who was the President of the National Assembly of Venezuela based on a vote on 5 January 2020.

The investigative journalism website Armando.info reported in 2019 that Parra was among nine lawmakers that mediated in favor of two businessmen linked with the government, and was accused of being involved in corruption with the Local Committees for Supply and Production (CLAP) program of the Nicolás Maduro government. After the investigation was published, Parra was expelled from his party Justice First, along with other deputies.

Parra is currently subjected to foreign sanctions for his involvement in the 2020 Venezuelan National Assembly Delegated Committee election.

== Political career ==
Luis Parra is a native of Yaracuy elected to represent its second circuit in the 2015 Venezuelan parliamentary election on the list of the victorious Democratic Unity Roundtable (MUD). Prior to holding office, he was an opposition student activist in Yaracuy and host of regional radio program “Más Claro no Canta un Gallo” broadcast by Rumbera Network. In 2005 he was a substitute councilor in the Independencia Municipality, Yaracuy. In 2013, he was a candidate for mayor of Independencia. In the 2017 Venezuelan regional elections, he stood as the MUD candidate for the governorship of Yaracuy, losing to the ruling party candidate, Julio César León Heredia. He served as president of the Commission for the Environment, Natural Resources and Climate Change between 2018 and 2019.

=== CLAP affair ===
On 1 December 2019, the website Armando.info published an investigation reporting that nine parliamentarians mediated in favor of two businessmen linked with the government. Parra was accused of being involved in corruption with the Local Committees for Supply and Production (CLAP) program of the Nicolás Maduro government. Parra denied the accusations, saying “There is a smear campaign against us and some of our fellow legislators in the Venezuelan parliament”, and describing himself as a victim of “extortion.”

After the investigation was published, the deputies Parra, José Brito, Conrado Pérez and José Gregorio Noriega were suspended and expelled from their parties Justice First and Popular Will. Parra, Brito and Pérez objected to their expulsion and filed a case before Venezuela's Supreme Tribunal of Justice, in which they petitioned the court to have their party membership reinstated.

=== Parliamentary crisis ===
On 5 January 2020, the 2020 Venezuelan National Assembly Delegated Committee election took place to determine who would be the President of the National Assembly for the period 2020-21 period, the last election of the IV legislature.

On the morning of the election, Parra announced his candidacy to the presidency of the National Assembly by surprise, against the incumbent president Juan Guaidó. Parra–who was previously barred from access to the legislative chambers–was granted access to the legislative palace while others of the opposition (to Maduro) were blocked at the entrance. Parra was joined by National Assembly deputies loyal to Maduro. In a chaotic scene, a hand vote was hastily taken and Parra was declared president. Opposition media said that only 18 former members of the opposition (known as “la bancada Clap”, the CLAP bench) supported Parra. The opposition reported that quorum was not achieved and no votes were counted. Police forces blocked the access to parliament to opposition members and media. A separate session was carried out outside parliament where 100 of the 167 deputies re-elected Juan Guaidó as president of the parliament.

Parra told reporters 140 lawmakers were present in the session and that his candidacy was approved with 81 votes. Ruling party deputy Pedro Carreño told AFP that the vote took place with 150 deputies present and that Parra received the simple majority of 84 needed to win. Nicolás Maduro recognized Parra as the new president of the National Assembly, saying that "there was a rebellion inside the National Assembly" and that "the National Assembly has made a decision".

Regarding the controversy of the opposition attempting to enter the Palacio Federal Legislativo, Maduro said "if the failed Guaidó did not want to enter it was because he did not have the votes", dismissing that Guaidó and his supporters were prevented from entering. When reporters asked Parra for the official tally of votes–usually released the same day–he said that it "was not available" and there is not announced date for its release. Guaidó called Parra a “pseudo deputy” who had “betrayed the nation.”

Parra said in an interview on 10 January that he had “a permanent channel of communication” with the U.S. since he assumed presidency of the Assembly, but special envoy to Venezuela for the U.S. government Elliott Abrams subsequently said his assertion was “absolutely false.”

Russia, one of Maduro's closest international allies, welcomed Parra's election. The Russian Foreign Ministry said that the election contributes to the return of the intra-Venezuelan political struggle to the constitutional field that will find a peaceful exit to the ongoing crisis. Opposition deputies denounced that Russia looked after supporting Parra to improve its businesses in Venezuela, including to increase the Russian shareholder participation in oil contracts and other mining concessions that need the approval of the National Assembly and that it would not have with Guaidó.

The Episcopal Conference of Venezuela rejected Luis Parra claim to the presidency of the National Assembly being "contrary to all constitutional legality", according to its presidency. Days later, Luis Parra accompanied by armed forces tried to meet the organization, but he was denied entry. Parra and his allies announced that they would come back with "more reinforcement".

The pro-Maduro Supreme Tribunal of Justice (TSJ) ruled in favor of Parra on 25 May 2020, recognizing him as the sole president of the National Assembly.

==== International sanctions ====
The United States Department of the Treasury's Office of Foreign Assets Control sanctioned Parra and seven other individuals, "who, at the bidding of Maduro, attempted to block the democratic process in Venezuela,” according to U.S. Secretary of Treasury Steven Mnuchin on 13 January 2020. The sanctioned have their assets in the U.S. frozen and are not allowed to do business with U.S. financial markets nor with U.S. citizens. The list also includes the other members of Parra's appointed board of directors: Franklyn Duarte, José Goyo Noriega and Negal Morales.

Hours later, Maduro's Foreign Minister Jorge Arreaza published a statement saying that the sanctions imposed by the U.S. Treasury against Parra and others seek to "interfere and undermine the proper functioning of democratic institutions, with the unusual intention to designate from Washington the authorities of the legislative power." The statement also argues that these tactics are "contrary to international law and undermine the stability, peace and self-determination of the Venezuelan people".

In June 2020, Luis Parra, Franklyn Duarte, Jose Gregorio Noriega, alongside other 8 individuals were sanctioned by the governments of the European Union after the Supreme Tribunal of Justice certified Parra as president of the National Assembly.
