= 2017 Venezuelan National Assembly attack =

Attack to the National Assembly of Venezuela by government supporters

- Part of 2017 Venezuelan protests and 2017 Venezuelan constitutional crisis
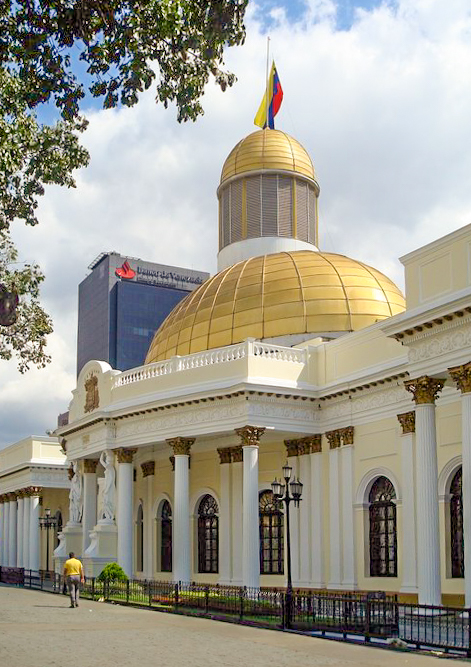
- The location of the attack, the Palacio Federal Legislativo

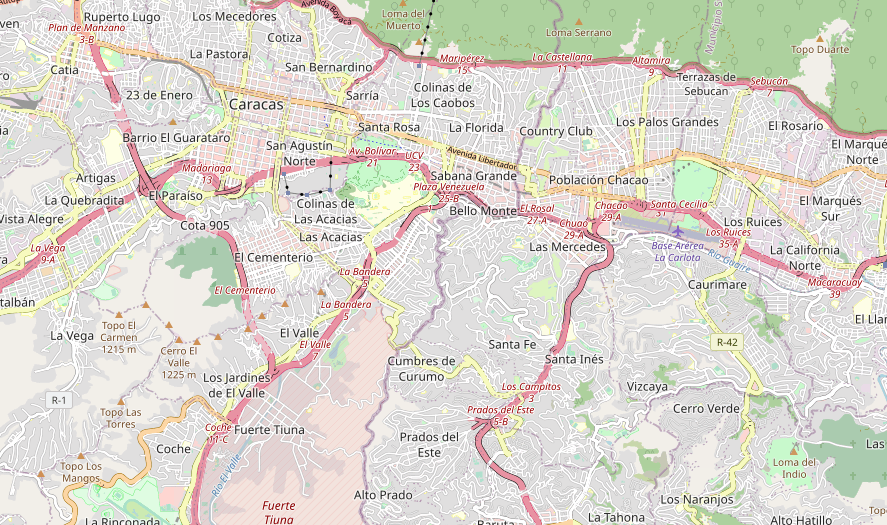
- 2017 Venezuelan National Assembly attack (Caracas) 2017 Venezuelan National Assembly attack (Venezuela)
- Location: 10°30′18″N 66°54′57″W; Caracas, Venezuela
- Date: 5 July 2017 (VST)
- Target: National Assembly
- Weapons: Clubs; Firearms
- Deaths: 0
- Injuries: 12
- Assailants: Bolivarian National Guard, colectivos and pro-government civilians

On 5 July 2017, colectivos and supporters of President Nicolás Maduro stormed the Palacio Federal Legislativo on the Independence Day of Venezuela, assaulting many members of the opposition-led National Assembly. At least 12 opposition legislators and their staff were injured as a result of the attack.

== Series of events ==
=== Ceremony ===
The day began with the National Assembly attempting to commemorate the Venezuelan Declaration of Independence. At approximately 8:20am VST, Vice President Tareck El Aissami, Interior Minister Néstor Reverol and Minister of Defense Vladimir Padrino López unexpectedly arrived at the Palacio Federal Legislativo with government supporters dressed in red, interrupting the days events. El Aissami delivered a speech calling on supporters to march to the Palacio Federal Legislativo and "to forge independence in the streets".

We are in the facilities of a state power that has been kidnapped by the same oligarchy that betrayed Bolívar and his cause ... I invite the people ... to come ... to the hemicycle and assume a proclamation to lead the future of the country

— Vice President, Tareck El Aissami,

After speaking for over fifteen minutes and calling for supporters to march to the palace, El Aissami left the area with his entourage.

=== Attack ===
By 9:18am VST, a calm had returned to the National Assembly as the lawmakers retreated into the Palacio Federal Legislativo. Speaker of the National Assembly, Julio Borges, spoke a half hour later calling for the Venezuelan armed forces to protect the will of the Venezuelan people and not that of a political party.

Government supporters began to congregate at the entrances of the Palacio Federal Legislativo at about 10:40am VST and at 11:45am VST, National Guardsmen stationed at the legislative palace allowed the crowds to enter the National Assembly facility.

Hundreds of people belonging to colectivos and pro-government groups then stormed the National Assembly armed with pipes, firearms and fireworks, proceeding to fire guns and tear gas throughout the area. By 1:30pm VST, colectivos were inside of the legislative palace assaulting individuals without any intervention from the National Guard. Some legislators made futile attempts to defend themselves from the government groups with fire extinguishers, Opposition lawmakers were beaten with objects and while some were attacked while lying defenseless on the ground. After hours of brawling occurred and many opposition officials were beaten, the National Guard finally withdrew pro-government groups from the facility.

Colectivos attacking lawmakers

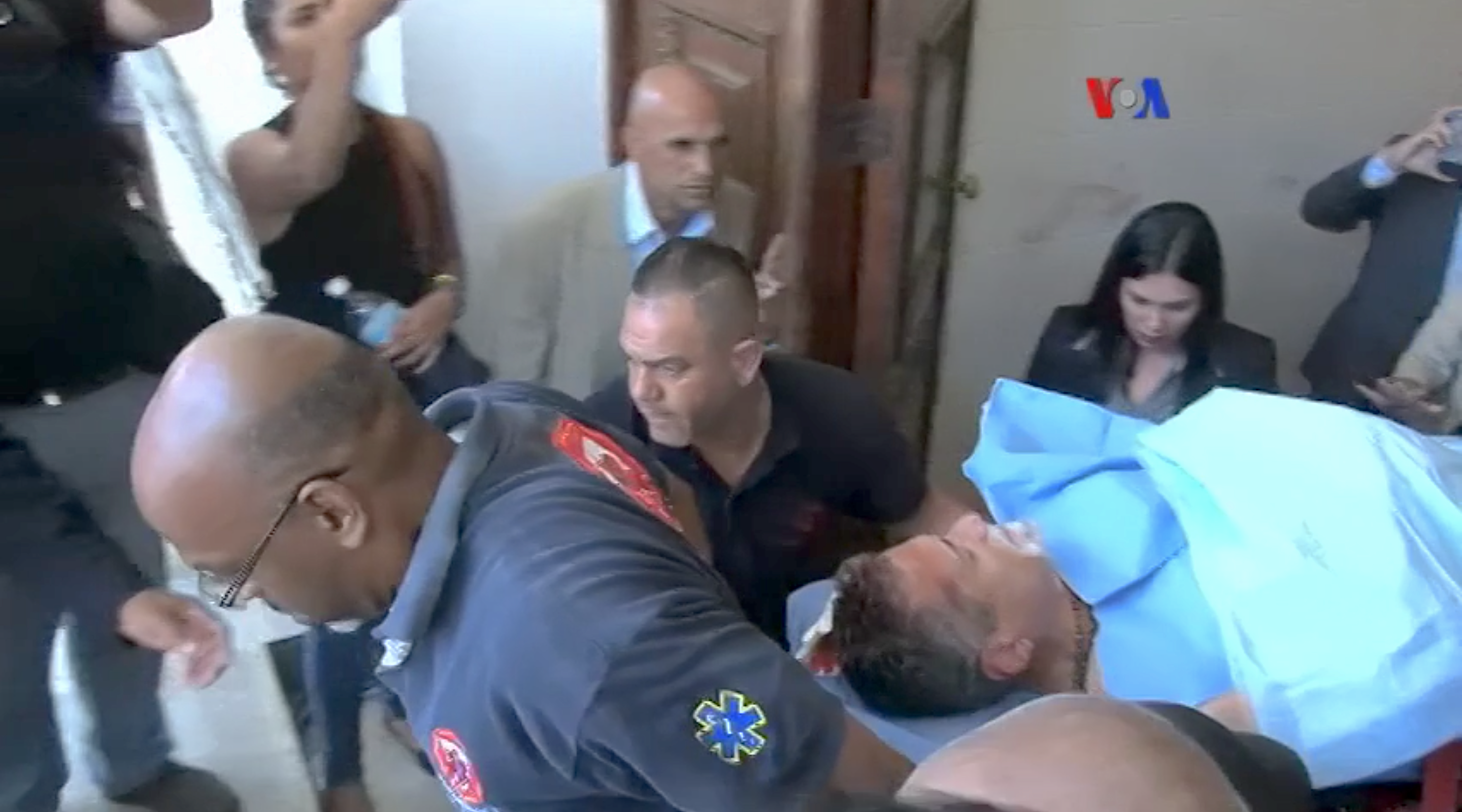
Americo De Grazia on a stretcher

Legislator Armando Armas bloodied following the attack

Following the attack, the walls and floors of the Palacio Federal Legislativo were left stained with the blood of opposition lawmakers. However, government supporters remained outside of the Palacio Federal Legislativo for hours, assaulting legislators as they left with the National Guard showing indifference to the pro-government attacks. By 7:10pm, authorities began to escort lawmakers to their vehicles and within twenty minutes, 90% of legislators were evacuated from the area, though journalists and photographers had to escape by their own will under a hail of bottles, fireworks and stones. As a result of the attack, at least 12 opposition officials and their staff were reported to be injured.

== Aftermath ==
=== Shortage of medical supplies ===
Following the attack, individuals injured could not receive treatment due to the shortage of medical supplies in the country and because the Bolivarian government prohibited the National Assembly from having proper medical insurance. Many asked for donations of gauze, bandages, antibiotics, antiseptics, IV solutions and painkillers.

== Response ==
=== Domestic ===
President Nicolás Maduro condemned the attack, describing it as a "strange event" and called for an investigation while National Assembly speaker Julio Borges described Maduro's remarks as "hypocritical", stating that "it was their armed groups that assaulted and attacked us".

=== International response ===
==== Governments ====
The governments of Mexico and Panama condemned the assault on the National Assembly.

- Colombia – The Colombian government, through its Foreign Ministry, issued a statement in which it expressed its emphatic condemnation of the acts of violence registered in the Venezuelan National Assembly and "urges the Venezuelan Government to" guarantee the safety of the members of the public powers. and respect their autonomy. " 8 14 Juan Manuel Santos, president of that country said on his Twitter account: " We condemn the acts of violence in the National Assembly in Caracas. We reiterate the urgent call for a negotiated and peaceful solution. "
- Peru – The president of Peru, Pedro Pablo Kuczynski, wrote on his Twitter account: "My absolute rejection and condemnation of the unacceptable acts of violence that occurred in the National Assembly of Venezuela."
- Mexico – The government of Mexico also condemned the events through a statement where it expressed its “strongest condemnation of the serious events that occurred today in the National Assembly of Venezuela, where organized groups broke into violently, injuring legislators and causing destruction. . Mexico expresses its solidarity with the members of the National Assembly, whose investiture must be respected at all times."
- Panama – The government of Panama, through its vice president Isabel Saint Malo condemned "emphatically and energetically the violence aroused in the National Assembly of the Bolivarian Republic of Venezuela, which left deputies, staff and journalists injured as a result." 16
- United Kingdom – The United Kingdom of Great Britain and Northern Ireland spoke through its ambassador in Caracas, John Saville, who wrote on his Twitter account: “I condemn a grotesque attack against the National Assembly of Venezuela and its deputies. To truly achieve peace, one must act democratically and without violence. "
- Germany – Minister of Foreign Affairs of Germany, Sigmar Gabriel, rejected the attack on the National Assembly and urged the national government to "punish those responsible." 18
- Spain – The government of Spain expressed its condemnation of these events and the attacks against parliamentarians in a statement from the Ministry of Foreign Affairs and urged the Venezuelan authorities to guarantee the security and independence of the Legislative Power. 19 Mariano Rajoy, head of the Spanish government wrote: "My conviction rotunda to the violent assault of the Parliament of Venezuela. Spain, with peace, freedom and the rights of the Venezuelan people. "
- USA – The United States of America, in a statement from the State Department, condemned "the attack against members of the Venezuelan National Assembly by armed supporters of the Government of President Nicolás Maduro." "This violence (...) is an assault on the democratic principles of the men and women who fought for the independence of Venezuela 206 years ago." 14
- Canada – Minister of Foreign Affairs of Canada, Chrystia Freeland, also rejected the assault on Parliament and urged the Government of Venezuela to respect democratic rights and give independence to the institutions that protect the rights of the Venezuelan people. 20
- Chile – The Minister of Foreign Affairs of Chile, Heraldo Muñoz, expressed the condemnation of the government of that country to the attack suffered by the National Assembly. "We issued a statement yesterday expressing our firm condemnation of these acts of violence against the National Assembly of Venezuela and the injured parliamentarians." 21
- Guatemala – The Guatemalan government, through its Ministry of Foreign Affairs, regretted and condemned these "acts of violence."
- European union flagThe president of the Parliament of the European Union Antonio Tajani wrote on the Twitter network: "I condemn the brutal assault on the National Assembly of Venezuela, a symbol of democracy."
- France – The French Ministry of Foreign Affairs through a statement expressed its condemnation of the "physical attacks of which several parliamentarians and members of the staff of the National Assembly in Caracas were victims." And he added: "There is no rule of law without respect for the institutions, nor democracy without a sovereign parliament and parliamentarians free to exercise their mandate without pressure or violence."

==== Supranational bodies ====
The Inter-American Commission on Human Rights and the United Nations condemned the attack.

- Mercosur - The countries of the Southern Common Market (MERCOSUR) (Brazil, Argentina, Paraguay and Uruguay) considered that "acts of violence" in the National Assembly "constitute a subjugation of the Executive over another Power of the State", and urged the government "to immediately put an end to all discourse and all actions that encourage greater polarization, with the consequent growth of violence, and to guarantee respect for Human Rights, the separation of powers and the validity of the rule of law. " 8
- OAS - The Secretary General of the OAS Luis Almagro called for a meeting between government takes place Venezuela and the OAS to find a solution to the crisis. 17

== See also ==
- National Assembly of Venezuela fight
- 2020 Venezuelan National Assembly Delegated Committee election
- Storming of the Venezuelan National Congress
- January 6 United States Capitol attack
- List of attacks on legislatures
