= Agus Morales =

- Born: Agus Morales; 1983 (age 42–43); El Prat de Llobregat (Barcelona, Spain)
- Occupation: Journalist
- Known for: 5W magazine Director
- Notable work: We are not refugees (2017)

Agus Morales (El Prat de Llobregat, 1983) is a Spanish journalist and writer, specialized in covering migration, conflicts, and humanitarian crises. He is the co-founder and director of the Spanish magazine 5W.

== Biography ==
He graduated in journalism and earned a PhD in language and literature from the Autonomous University of Barcelona (UAB) with a doctoral thesis on the author Rabindranath Tagore. Currently, he combines his journalistic work with teaching as an associate professor at the same university.

He began his career as a correspondent for the EFE Agency, a role he held for six years (2007–2012) in India and Pakistan. Subsequently, he worked for three years for the organization Doctors Without Borders, covering humanitarian emergencies in Africa and the Middle East.

In 2015, he co-founded the magazine Revista 5W, focused on long-form journalism and international information. Throughout his career, he has collaborated with various international media outlets such as The New York Times, The Washington Post, and the magazine Gatopardo, as well as national Spanish media including TV3, Catalunya Ràdio, RAC1, RNE, LaSexta, and Cadena SER.

As a reporter, he has written about global events such as the death of Osama bin Laden, the return of the Taliban to power in Afghanistan, the Ukrainian exodus, and the reality of refugees.

== Literary work ==
His work lies at the intersection of journalism and literature:

- We are not refugees (2017): Work recommended by the Gabo Festival and translated into English, Italian, and Polish.
- Cuando todo se derrumba (2021) [When Everything Collapses]: A chronicle of the COVID-19 pandemic.
- Ya no somos amigos (2022) [We Are No Longer Friends]: His first novel.
- La hipocresía solidaria (2025) [The Solidarity Hypocrisy]: His latest essay.

== Awards and recognition ==
- Ortega y Gasset Award (2019) for the chronicle "Los muertos que me habitan" [The dead who inhabit me], published in 5W.
- Montserrat Roig Social Journalism Award (2020), as part of the winning team.
- Saliou Traoré Journalism Award (2022) for his work on Africa.
- Montserrat Roig Award for research in social rights (2023).
