= National Assembly of Venezuela fight =

2013 brawl in the national assembly

- Part of Crisis in Venezuela
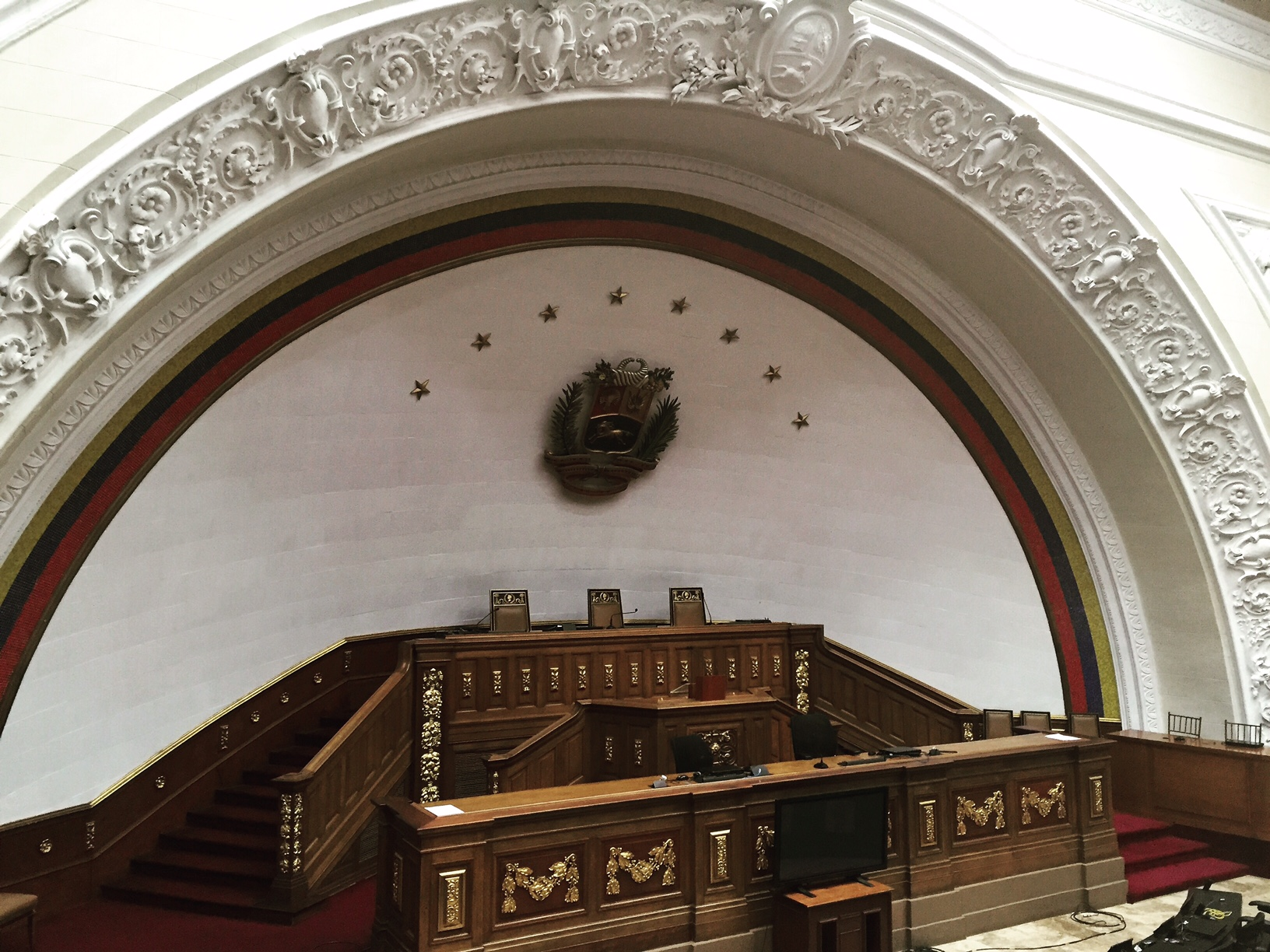
- The sessions hemicycle of the Venezuelan National Assembly, where the brawl took place
- Date: 30 April 2013
- Location: Federal Legislative Palace, Caracas, Venezuela
- Caused by: Disavowal of the results of the 2013 presidential elections and of Nicolás Maduro as president of Venezuela.; Refusal of the president of the National Assembly, Diosdado Cabello, to grant the right to speak to opposition deputies.; Tensions between opposition and the ruling party

Parties
Opposition deputies	Pro-government deputies

Casualties and losses
Injured: Julio Borges; María Corina Machado; Américo de Grazia; Ismael García; Nora Bracho; Homero Ruiz; Eduardo Gómez Sigala	Injured: Nancy Ascencio; Odalis Monzón; Maigualida Barrera; Claudio Farías
- Eleven deputies injured in total

A brawl in the National Assembly of Venezuela took place on 30 April 2013 at the Federal Legislative Palace, in Caracas, after opposition deputies who did not recognize the results of the 2013 presidential elections and the ruling party's candidate Nicolás Maduro as president were denied the right to speak for the second consecutive ordinary session. The brawl resulted in at least 11 deputies injured.

== Background ==
Following the death of Hugo Chávez, Capriles was also a candidate for the 2013 presidential election, where the pro-government candidate Nicolás Maduro was declared winner by a narrow margin. The opposition denounced irregularities during the process, and Capriles' campaign command said that they detected at least 3,500 irregularities had been detected during the voting process. The opposition demanded for a total vote recount, a request also made by National Electoral Council (CNE) rector Vicente Díaz and which was supported by the governments of Spain, United States, France, Paraguay, and the Secretary General of the OAS, José Miguel Insulza. Nicolás Maduro accepted the audit proposed by the opposition but was rejected by the CNE, which declared that the process was automated and that the proposed audit could not be carried out in the proposed terms, arguing that it was not foreseen in the legal system.

The President of the National Assembly, Diosdado Cabello, announced that he would withhold the salaries of those deputies who questioned the legitimacy of Nicolás Maduro as president, and in the 16 April parliamentary session he prevented said deputies from speaking. During the session, opposition deputy William Dávila (Democratic Action, Mérida state) was hit with a microphone by a pro-government deputy, for which he needed 16 stitches.

Capriles formally presented his request on 17 April, with all the corresponding complaints and the petition for the total verification of the tally sheets. The CNE accepted the verification "in second phase" of 46% of the voting boxes not randomly audited at first. However, this audit was not endorsed by Capriles, arguing that the same "should have been carried out together with a review of the voting notebooks", and proceeded to challenge the electoral process for which reason the process was challenged before the Supreme Tribunal of Justice.

== Brawl ==
During the 30 April parliamentary session, Diosdado Cabello ordered the removal of the microphones from the seats of the opposition deputies. Upon arriving at the floor, the opposition legislators had to wait for the pro-government deputies to take their seats. After almost three hours of delay in the beginning of the session, the microphones were returned and less than half an hour of the agenda was completed, Cabello prevented the opposition legislators from participating again in the debate and silenced William Dávila. Opposition deputies responded by sounding airhorns and vuvuzelas as a protest and displayed a banner reading "Coup to the Parliament".

A brawl started; ANTV, the Assembly official television channel, focused the camera shots on the roof of the chamber and broadcast the audio of the Assembly Secretary, Iván Zerpa, when he was reading the approval of new additional credits.

Opposition deputy Ismael García said that the doors of the chamber were closed and that independent media outlets had no access to the Assembly hall. The fight lasted several minutes and was reconstructed by amateur videos taken by the opposition legislators. At the beginning, the pro-government deputies snatched the banner and attacked the opposition deputies. Deputy María Corina Machado went up to complain to Diosdado Cabello when she was pulled by the hair, thrown to the floor and kicked in the face by pro-government deputy Nancy Ascencio, who minutes before had attacked her. Machado stated that Cabello laughed while the opponents were being attacked.

Among the most badly injured were Julio Borges, who was hit in the left cheekbone, and María Corina Machado, who suffered a deviated nasal septum. Américo de Grazia, deputy for the Bolívar state, had to be hospitalized after being hit by five pro-government supporters and falling downstairs. Opposition deputies Ismael García, Nora Bracho, Homero Ruiz and Eduardo Gómez Sigala also suffered minor contusions. The United Socialist Party of Venezuela reported as injured its deputies Odalis Monzón, Nancy Ascencio, Maigualida Barrera and Claudio Farías. However, amateur videos taken by the opposition recorded that the same deputies promoted the attack against the opponents.

== See also ==
- 2013 Venezuelan presidential election
- 2013 Venezuelan presidential election protests
- 2017 Venezuelan National Assembly attack
- Storming of the Venezuelan National Congress
- Legislative violence
