= 2013 Venezuelan presidential election protests =

Crisis over Nicolás Maduro's victory

2013 political crisis in Venezuela
- Part of the Crisis in Venezuela and the Protests against Nicolás Maduro
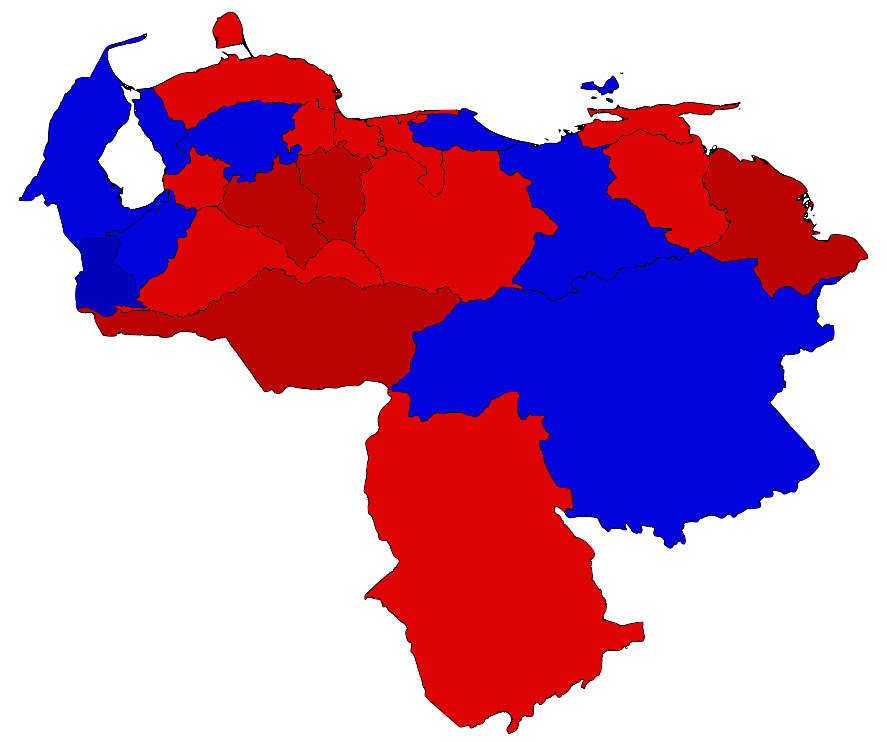
- Results of the presidential elections of 2013
- Date: 14 April – 22 October 2013 (6 months, 1 week and 1 day)
- Location: Venezuela
- Caused by: 2013 Venezuelan presidential election
- Goals: Rejection of Nicolás Maduro as electoral winner
- Methods: Public demonstrations

Parties
Great Patriotic Pole	Democratic Unity Roundtable

Lead figures
Nicolás Maduro; Diosdado Cabello; Jorge Rodríguez; Francisco Ameliach; Tareck El Aissami; Elías Jaua	Henrique Capriles; Leopoldo López; María Corina Machado; Ismael García; Liliana Hernández; Antonio Ledezma

Casualties
- Deaths: 11 dead (official figures)

The 2013 Venezuelan political crisis refers to the events that occurred after the presidential elections of the same year, mostly protests in response of the electoral result in which Nicolás Maduro of the Great Patriotic Pole (GPP) was elected as President of Venezuela.

== Presidential elections ==
After the presidential elections on 14 April 2013, opposition leader Capriles rejected the bulletin issued by the National Electoral Electoral (CNE) and ask for a recount of the 100% of the votes, because his campaign command reported at least 3,500 irregularities during the electoral process, petition that was joined by CNE rector Vicente Díaz and supported by the governments of Spain, France, the United States, Paraguay, and the Secretary General of the Organization of American States, José Miguel Insulza. At the start, Maduro accepted the audit proposed by the opposition.

Henrique Capriles presented his request formally on 17 April 2013, with all the corresponding complainte and the petition of the total verification of the acts; the CNE held a meeting for hours the same day until it accepted the verification "in second phase", the 46% of the ballot boxes not randomly audited at first. However, this audit was not supported by Capriles, who argued that itt«should have been carried out along with a review of the voting notebooks», reason why the process was challenged before the Supreme Tribunal of Justice (TSJ).

== See also ==
- Protests against Nicolás Maduro
- 2014 Venezuelan protests
- 2016 Venezuela protests
- National Assembly of Venezuela fight
