= El Pitazo =

Venezuelan news website

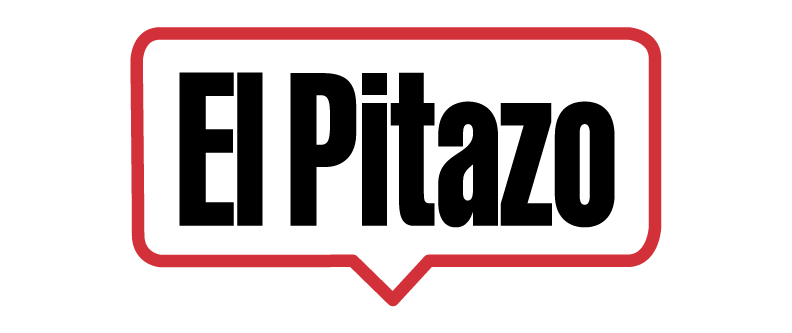
- Website type: News site
- Available in: Spanish
- Headquarters: {{{location_country}}}
- Editor: César Batiz
- Website: elpitazo.net
- Launched: 2014
- Current status: Online

El Pitazo is an independent Venezuelan multimedia franchise. The name "pitazo" refers to whistleblowing. It is part of the Latin American media Rebel Alliance, with Tal Cual and Runrunes. They also collaborate with NGOs to be more informed on diverse groups of people in the nation. According to El País, the aims of El Pitazo are to bring news to the most isolated areas. The company director is César Batiz.

In 2019 it won the Ortega y Gasset Award for Best Multimedia Coverage, for a report on starving children, "La generación del hambre"" (English: The generation of hunger). According to Batiz, this is the first time a Venezuelan media outlet has won the award.

== History ==
Reporters on an El Pitazo press pass have been denied access to events, particularly covering government activities and elections; a security guard told one reporter he barred from the National Electoral Council that the order "came from above". Actions like this are in violation of Article 58 of the constitution of Venezuela. In this instance, during the campaigns for the 2018 presidential election, opposition candidate Henri Falcón tried to intervene to bring the reporters, among press personnel from multiple other media, into the building; several were allowed in but the security said the bar on El Pitazo was too strict to allow them through.

=== Blocking of website ===
The El Pitazo website has been blocked on multiple occasions. Batiz said in August 2018 that none of the blocks thus far had been given an explanation, and that there had also been no reports against the website that would justify blocking it.

The first block of the website occurred in early September 2017, by CANTV and Digitel, followed by Movistar in early November. To avoid the block, the web address was changed from .com to .info on 15 January 2018.

The new web address was then blocked in early April 2018 by CANTV, but the directors had been prepared and already set-up a web address hosted in Malaysia, .ml, which they switched to the same day.

In early August 2018, the website was blocked by more providers than ever before; all of the previous ISPs as well as Inter and SuperCable. The Press and Society Institute, Venezuela (IPYS) reported that this block was intermittent throughout the day and targeted different states at different times, making it a more complex "attack" on the website that was more difficult to circumvent and also harder to justify creating a new web address, even though the effect on readership was the same. For several weeks, other news websites—both in the Rebel Alliance and not—published El Pitazo reports in solidarity; El Pitazo also used Facebook as a platform to host their reports and encouraged people to use VPNs to access their website. IPYS mentioned that they had developed some offline methods of communication in response, like holding informal public meetings in parks across the country and in bookshops to spread news. In an interview with Caracas Chronicles, Batiz said that he could guess the blocks were because he published reports that made the government "uncomfortable", like one in late July 2018 exposing corruption in PdVSA.

Jony Rahal, the 2018 President of the Commission for Media and Communication in the National Assembly (AN), presented a report to the AN in August 2018 that concluded that CANTV and the government agency Conatel were responsible for the blocks. Batiz planned to take the report to international human rights groups.

=== Cyber attacks ===
The website suffered several cyber attacks in June and July 2018. These came in the form of DDoS (a kind of denial of service attack), with over 1800 IPs targeting El Pitazo's current and past web addresses. Though still able to publish on social media during the denial of access, the attacks are characterized as a refusal of the right to free speech.

During the August 2018 website blocks, the writers also received DDoS reports when trying to publish content, which is a targeted cyber attack not allowing them to access their own website.

== Notable reports and investigations ==
In 2016, the El Pitazo editorial board contributed to Univision's coverage of the Narcosobrinos affair.

=== Huérfanos de la Salud ===
El Pitazo co-created with IPYS the multimedia report on children who suffer due to poor health services in Venezuela. It won the 2018 Roche Health Journalism prize for Internet reports. It was also nominated in the Best Coverage category of the 2018 Gabriel García Márquez Journalism Awards.

=== La generación del hambre ===
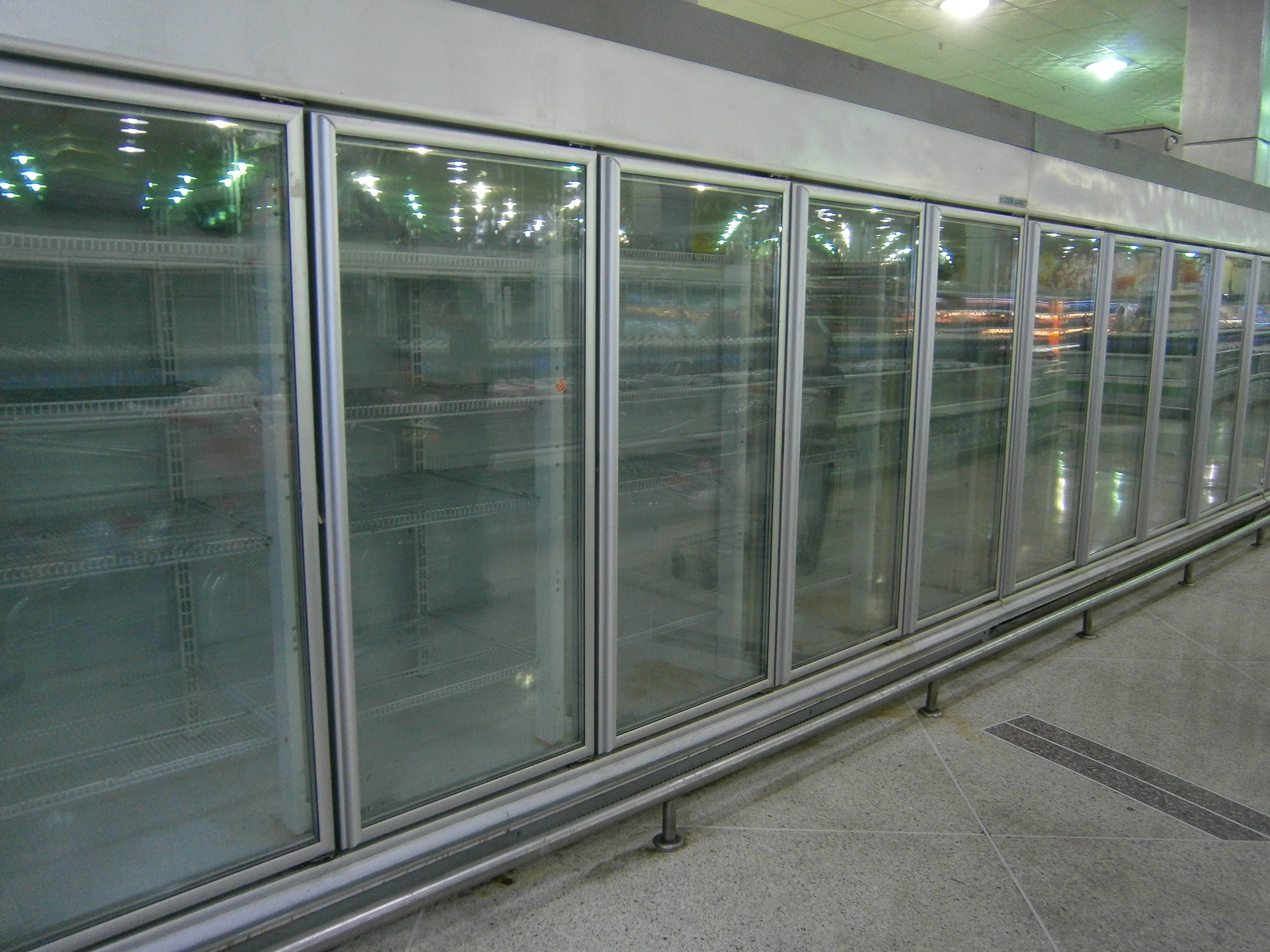
A supermarket in Los Teques, showing the scarcity of preservable food

Throughout 2018 for eight months, fourteen journalists led by Johanna Osorio Herrera followed the lives of eight children all born in 2013, chosen because nutrition in the first 5 years of life is the most important. The report won the 2019 Ortega y Gasset Award for Best Multimedia Coverage, to be presented at the CaixaForum Madrid on 9 May 2019; for winning, they receive 15,000 euro and a sculpture by Eduardo Chillida. On announcing the award, the jury commended the journalists, saying that "They are a group of young and admirable journalists who take risks and who go to the places where things happen, to find the facts and report them".

The aims of the investigation were to expose the effects of the economic policy of the Nicolás Maduro administration on young children growing up under it, particularly on hunger and starvation as these are "the most intimate in human lives". El País reported that the results were "saddening" because of the clear irreversible damage suffered by the infants, one of whom died during the process.

== See also ==
- List of newspapers in Venezuela
