= Agustín Castilla Marroquín =

Mexican politician

- Born: 20 October 1969 (age 56); Mexico City, Mexico
- Occupation: Politician
- Political party: PAN

Agustín Carlos Castilla Marroquín (born 20 October 1969) is a Mexican politician from the National Action Party (PAN). He served as a local PAN deputy in the IV Legislative Assembly of the Congress of Mexico City from 2006 to 2009. As local deputy, he was the primary congressman involved in the investigation of the Casitas del Sur shelter. From 2009 to 2012 he served as Deputy of the LXI Legislature of the Mexican Congress representing the Federal District.
