= Storming of the Venezuelan National Congress =

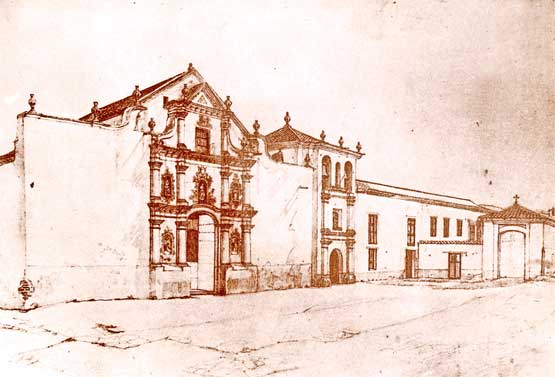
- Convent of San Francisco, Caracas, former seat of Congress and place of attack
- Date: January 24, 1848
- Location: Caracas, Venezuela
- Caused by: Disagreements between conservatives and liberals
- Result: Start of the Venezuelan civil war (1848–1849); José Tadeo Monagas consolidates power

Parties
Conservatives	Liberals

Casualties and losses
3 deaths	1 deaths

The Storming of the Venezuelan National Congress, also known as Assault on the National Congress, was a brawl on 24 January 1848 at the headquarters of the Venezuelan Congress in Caracas that marked the definitive rupture between the Conservatives and Liberals, which had led almost two decades of continuous clashes.

== Course of events ==
At the beginning of 1848, the Congress was discussing the trial of the president José Tadeo Monagas for acts that violated the constitution. He was accused of having exercised extraordinary powers illegally, using armed force without the consent of the Governing Council, and having exercised the administration outside the capital. This resulted in a strong political dispute between the government of José Tadeo Monagas backed by the Liberal Party, and José Antonio Páez, supported by the Conservative Party.

On January 24, 1848 the Minister of Internal Affairs and Justice, Martín Sanabria, moved to the seat of the Legislative Power to render the annual report of the Executive Power. While on the premises, the vice president of the Chamber of Deputies asked that he remains in the room. Outside of the Congress, rumor had it that Sanabria had been arrested or assassinated, which angered the liberal mob on the street, which tried to enter but was repelled by the guard, initiating the confrontation. During the event, Santos Michelena was wounded by a bayonet, and succumbed to his injuries two months later on March 12. The parliamentarians Francisco Argote, José Antonio Salas and Juan García were also killed by the mob, as were the sergeant Pedro Pablo Azpúrua and a tailor involved in the brawl. The head of the guard of the legislative body, Guillermo Smith, was also wounded during the confrontation. Monagas, alerted of the events in course, comes on horseback accompanied by the general Santiago Mariño and his forces to restore order.

== Aftermath ==
After the events, the parliament took years to get back its autonomy. The Legislative Power and the Judicial Power lost their independence and were under direct control of the President of the Republic. The National Congress, which presumed the prosecution of the president at the start of the events dismissed him. Until that day, the National Congress had the majority of representatives of the conservative party, of many of them, out of fear, requested asylum, delegations, or fled to Curaçao

Paez and the conservatives were ousted from power, which passed to the hands of Monagas and the Liberals, so the conservatives took the road of arms trying to regain power. Paez rose against Monagas few days after January 24; but he was defeated in the battle of Los Araguatos and had to take refuge in the republic of New Granada. In mid-1849 he landed in La Vela de Coro, and started another battle but he was defeated again by the government troops, commanded by José Laurencio Silva, who offered him capitulation, but Monagas refused to recognize the terms of the capitulation offered by Silva, and in consequence Páez was imprisoned, and eventually exiled.

== See also ==
- National Assembly of Venezuela fight
- 2017 Venezuelan National Assembly attack
- 2020 Venezuelan National Assembly Delegated Committee election
- List of attacks on legislatures
