= Franklyn Duarte =

Venezuelan politician

Franklyn Leonardo Duarte is a Venezuelan politician who currently serves as deputy to the National Assembly representing Táchira. Duarte assumed the post in October 2017 after the main deputy, Laidy Gómez, was elected governor of Táchira.

== Controversies ==
=== Threats from the Maduro government ===
Duarte has received repeated threats from Freddy Bernal and on 24 April 2019 he denounced that violent groups marked the home of several opposition leaders in the state with the acronym of the National Liberation Army (ELN), next to his, whose gate was struck with stones. Duarte also denounced that pamphlets were left under the doors of the houses with his name and that of other opposition politicians in which they are accused as "terrorists."

=== 2020 Venezuelan National Assembly Delegated Committee election ===
On 5 January 2020, during the Election of the Delegate Commission of the National Assembly of Venezuela, the first vice president of the National Assembly was elected by Luis Parra, in an act denounced as void by the opposition majority.

Following the events, the COPEI party announced that deputies Franklyn Duarte and Manuel González would be sent to the party's disciplinary council for their involvement in Parra's proclamation. Duarte was subsequently expelled from COPEI on 6 January 2020.

=== Sanctions ===
The United States Department of the Treasury sanctioned Duarte, Luis Parra and five others relation to Operación Alacrán, "who, at the bidding of Maduro, attempted to block the democratic process in Venezuela", according to US Secretary of Treasury Steven Mnuchin on 13 January 2020. Those sanctioned have had their US assets frozen and have been banned from doing business with US financial markets and US citizens.

In June 2020, Luis Parra, Franklyn Duarte, Jose Gregorio Noriega, alongside other 8 individuals were sanctioned by the European Union after the Supreme Tribunal of Justice certified Parra as president of the National Assembly.
