= Giannina Segnini =

Costa Rican investigative journalist (born 1970)

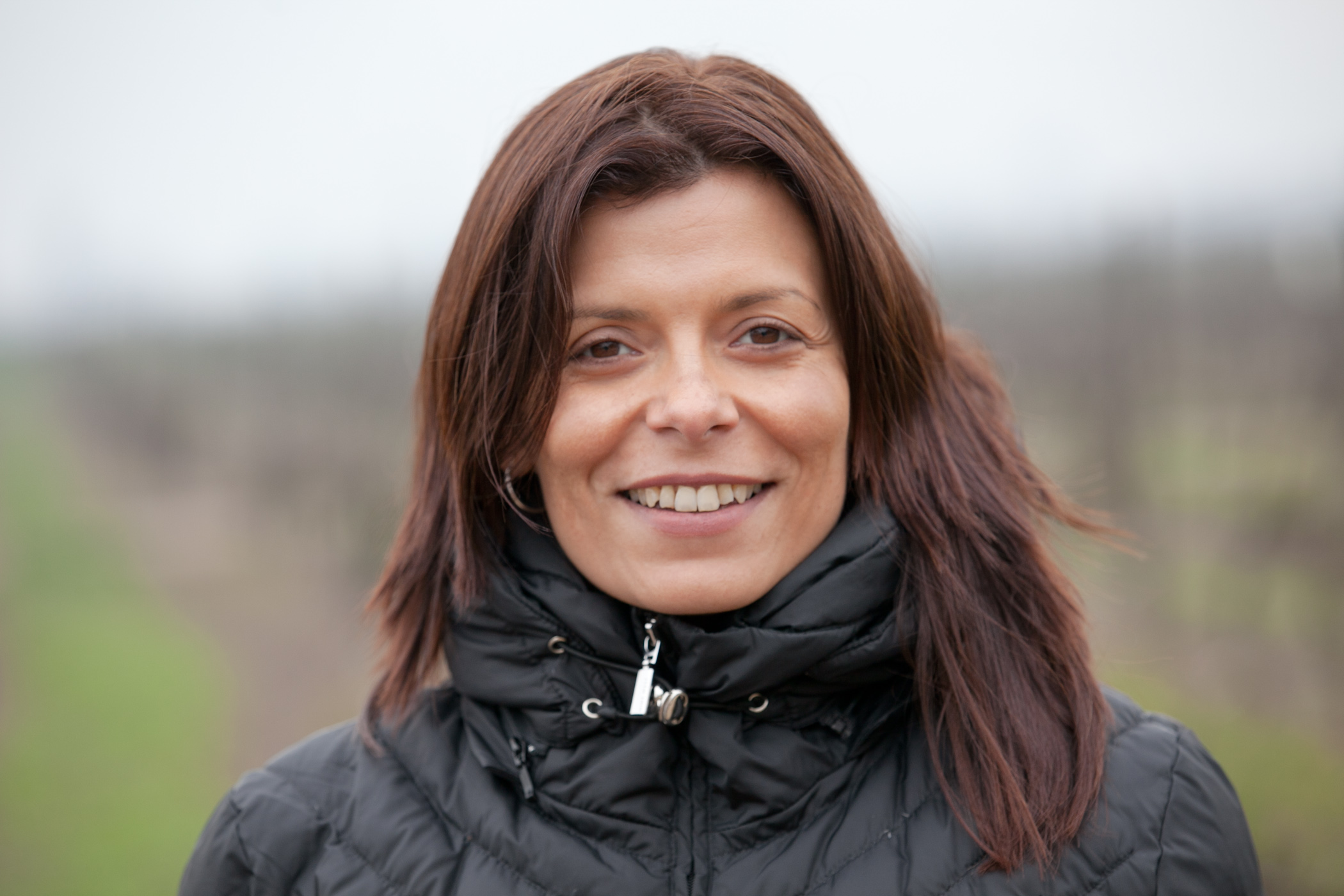
- Segnini in 2011
- Born: Giannina Segnini Picado; 1970 (age 55–56); Costa Rica
- Education: Nieman Foundation for Journalism; University of Costa Rica
- Occupation: Journalist
- Employers: Columbia University Graduate School of Journalism; La Nación
- Organization: International Consortium of Investigative Journalists
- Awards: Ortega y Gasset Award (2005); Maria Moors Cabot Prize (2014)

Giannina Segnini Picado (born 1970) is a Costa Rican journalist recognized for having uncovered two political scandals that led to convictions of former presidents – the ICE-Alcatel and Caja-Fischel cases. She has become a distinguished figure in Latin America for her work in investigative and data journalism.

== Biography ==
Giannina Segnini graduated with a degree in collective communication sciences from the University of Costa Rica in 1987, and was a Fellow at the Nieman Foundation for Journalism at Harvard University from 2001 to 2002.

She is a member of the International Consortium of Investigative Journalists (ICIJ), and is director of the Columbia University Graduate School of Journalism's Master of Science Data Journalism Program. She has given numerous lectures globally on investigative data journalism and corruption.

Her daughter is model and actress Carolina Coto Segnini.

== Work at La Nación ==
Segnini began working at the newspaper La Nación in 1994, creating its Research and Data Intelligence Unit, a multidisciplinary team that combined work with databases and street reporting. She served as its director until 2014. In 2004, together with Ernesto Rivera and Mauricio Herrera Ulloa, she published a series of articles that revealed cases of corruption of former presidents Rafael Ángel Calderón Fournier (1990–1994) and Miguel Ángel Rodríguez (1998–2002). Both received multi-year prison sentences, although Calderón's was conditionally enforced, while Rodriguez's appeals led to his acquittal.

Within the newspaper, she wrote about leaked diplomatic cables related to Costa Rica and investigated irregular handling of money from the Episcopal Conference of Costa Rica, the abandonment of children by parents subsidized by the state, undeclared properties of ministers, and illegal political campaign contributions.

== Departure from La Nación ==
Less than two weeks after the 2014 general election, La Nación did not publish the results of a commissioned survey, as reported by Semanario Universidad. La Nación justified the decision in an editorial the following day, arguing that "in the special circumstances of this election, we would contribute little to the civic process and much to malicious speculation."

After the first electoral round, Segnini resigned, stating "a series of editorial decisions of this newspaper, based on reasons that I consider foreign to journalism, prevent me from continuing to work for this company." Along with her team, she developed and contributed greatly to the ICIJ interactive application for the Offshore Leaks project, as well as participating in ICIJ's Panama Papers project.

== Awards ==
- 2005 Ortega y Gasset Award with her colleagues Ernesto Rivera and Mauricio Herrera (Best Research Work category) for her notes on the ICE-Alcatel case
- 2009 Latin American Prize for Investigative Journalism from Transparency International
- 2012 Pío Víquez National Award for her journalistic career in Costa Rica
- 2013 Latin American Prize for Investigative Journalism (third place) from Transparency International
- 2013 Recognition of Excellence from the Gabo Foundation for her "exceptional contribution to the advancement of journalism, developing and adapting the potential of new technologies at the service of reporting and the promotion of data journalism in Latin America"
- 2014 Maria Moors Cabot Prize from Columbia University
- Jorge Vargas Gené National Award of Costa Rica three times
