= Carolina Coto Segnini =

Costa Rican model

- Born: San José, Costa Rica
- Education: Latin University of Costa Rica; London School of Economics and Political Science
- Occupations: Model, actress
- Height: 5 ft (1.5 m)
- Beauty pageant titleholder
- Title: Miss Global Beauty Queen 2009
- Agency: State Management (New York); Wilhelmina Models (New York, Talent); Aperture Talent; Wilhelmina Models (Chicago); CGM Models (Miami); Heffner Management (Seattle); Model Club INC (Boston); W Model Management (London); Paragon Model Management (Mexico)
- Years active: 2006–present
- Hair color: Light brown
- Eye color: Green
- Major competitions: Miss Reef International (Top 7); Miss World Costa Rica 2009 (Top 10)
- Website: carolinacoto.com

Carolina Coto Segnini is a Costa Rican model and actress. She has appeared on the cover of magazines such as Health & Fitness, Runners World, Revista Ejercicio y Salud and SoHo. In addition, she appeared in campaigns of Clairol, Nike and Adidas. She represented her country as Miss Global Beauty Queen 2009, held in China.

== Early life ==
She was born in San Jose, Costa Rica. She is the daughter of the Costa Rican journalist Giannina Segnini, who is of Italian/Lebanese descent. Her father is Spanish/Costa Rican. She is an alumna of the Latin University of Costa Rica and London School of Economics and Political Science. Coto practiced Olympic gymnastics and competitive cheerleading throughout her childhood. She began her modeling career at the age of twelve.

She was part of the athletics and taekwondo team during her school days while living in Cambridge, England. She has been practicing boxing for 12 years.

== Career ==
In 2006, Coto was selected in the top seven for Miss Reef International. She represented Costa Rica in the international beauty pageant Miss Global Beauty Queen 2009, held in China where she also won the Miss Bikini award. She was in the top ten contestants for Miss World Costa Rica in 2009. She joined Elite Model Management in 2009.

Coto has worked for designers such as Nicolita, Emilia Wickstead, Luli Fama and Nicole Miller. She debuted in the Mercedes-Benz Fashion Week for Swim in July 2010. She walked for designers such as Dorit Swimwear at Mercedes-Benz Fashion Week in 2011 and 2012.

She has worked for Avon Products, Hermès, Woods, 2XU and Mango and appeared in ad campaigns for Clairol, Nike, and Adidas.

Coto made the cover of the last Soho magazine in Costa Rica in 2013 in celebration of the environment, as the "green issue", she appeared in a previous cover in 2009. In London, England, she appeared in a campaign for Stella Artois and Water.org. She has also appeared in Self magazine and Women's Runners. In June 2014, she appeared on the cover of Runners World Brazil. In December 2014, she campaigned for Nike, Inc. and Adidas in Europe, which was seen in England, Switzerland, Spain, France, Italy, and Germany. Coto has been featured on the cover of Health & Fitness magazine in England on five occasions in 2015 and 2016.

She also starred in the role of a boxer in 2017, the I Am advertising video for the martial arts sportswear brand, Kimurawear. The production won several awards as best commercial, among recognitions including: Los Angeles Independent Film Festival, Paris Play Film Festival, Hollywood International Moving Pictures Film Festival, Oniros Film Awards, among others.

She appeared in television commercials for Zudy Software with Super Bowl star Julian Edelman and Simon's Army in The X Factor.

In June 2018, she played the lead role of a young mother in the music video No es Justo by J Balvin, directed by Daniel Duran.

Coto has worked with the agencies CGM Models in Miami, Wilhelmina Models in Chicago, Model Club in Boston, Heffner Model Management in Seattle, W Model Management in London and Mexico, and State Model Management in New York City.

=== Pageants ===
Year	Title(s)	Status
2007	Miss Reef International	Top 7
2009	Miss World Costa Rica	Top 10
2009	Miss Global Beauty Queen	Miss Bikini

=== Music videos ===
Year	Album(s)	Artist(s)	Label(s)
2018	Vibras (album)	J Balvin	Universal Latin
2011	Judaa	Amrinder Gill, Dr Zeus	Speed Records

=== Commercials ===
Company	Year	Promoting	Region	Ref.
Kolbi Telecom	2013	Kolbi Telecom Services	Costa Rica	
Clairol	2018	Clairol Nice n' Easy	United States	
Clairol	2018	Clairol Nice n’Easy (damage control)	United States	
Zudy Software	2017	Software	United States	
KimuraWear	2017	Martial Arts Gear	United States	
Nike	2014	Fashion & Sport	Europe	
Clark's Shoes	2016	Fashion	United States	

== Other work ==
She was selected by the Internet Society as a candidate to attend to LACIGF (Latin America and Caribbean Internet Governance Forum) in Bogotá, Colombia. She also served as vice president of the Internet Society's New York Chapter (ISOC-NY).

Coto is co-founder of a company called Ecomercado, which provides organic products in Costa Rica.
