= Martha Bátiz =

Mexican-Canadian writer

Martha Batiz Zuk (born 1971) is a Mexican-Canadian writer, who was born and raised in Mexico City, but has been living in Toronto since 2003. She started publishing in 1993 at age 22.

== Writing career ==
By age 25 she had been awarded the most prestigious Creative Writing scholarships available in Mexico: from the Mexico's Institute of Fine Arts (1993–94); from the former Mexican Writers' Centre (Centro Mexicano de Escritores in 1994–95) where famous writers like Carlos Fuentes, Rosario Castellanos, Homero Aridjis, among many others also received scholarships at the beginning of their careers; and Young Creators from the National Fund for the Culture and the Arts (1995–96). In 1996 she was the first Mexican to ever be awarded an accesit in the International Short-story Contest "Miguel de Unamuno" in Salamanca, Spain, where her story competed against 1,708 entries from Latin America and Spain. In the anthology of the winning stories, published by the Caja Salamanca y Soria in 1997, Martha is the only female and also the youngest writer. She appears alongside writers such as Juan Manuel de Prada.

Martha held a weekly column in the Cultural Section of newspaper Uno Mas Uno and its cultural supplement Sábado from 1993 to 1999. She has also collaborated with magazines such as Nexos, Etcetera, El Universo del Buho and El Reto. In Canada, she published articles in the Hispanic newspaper El Correo Canadiense. Her story Ants was published in Exile Literary Quarterly in the Summer Issue of 2006.

Her articles, chronicles, reviews and short stories have appeared in diverse newspapers and magazines also in Spain, Dominican Republic, Puerto Rico, Peru and Canada. Her short-stories have received awards in literary contests in Mexico and Spain. She published a short-story collection called A todos los voy a matar (I’m Going To Kill Them All) in 2000. "La primera taza de cafe" ("The first cup of coffee") was published by Ariadna Press in Mexico City in May 2007, featuring a collection if selected articles, chronicles and short-stories published from 1993 until 1999 in "Sabado", the cultural supplement of Mexican newspaper Uno Mas Uno. Martha also collaborated with the essay "Mexico visto desde Canada, o de mi vecino chilango y otros asuntos relevantes" in the book Mexico visto desde lejos, published by Taurus and El Colegio de Chihuahua in January 2008. A new edition of Martha's short-stories is forthcoming with Terranova Editores in Puerto Rico in the summer of 2012.

In December 2005, she was awarded the SOMOS Latin American Achievement Award in Toronto for her literary work. Her first novel, "Boca de Lobo", placed second in the prestigious novel contest Casa de Teatro in the Dominican Republic and was published by Leon Jimenes Press in that country. "Boca de lobo" has also been published in Mexico, by the Instituto Mexiquense de Cultura and in English as "The Wolf's Mouth" in Canada, by Exile Editions.

More recently, her short story "The Last Confession" was published in the Carter V. Cooper Short Fiction Anthology Series by Exile Editions. This as a result of the 2012 Vanderbilt/Exile Short Fiction Competition open to all Canadian writers, which features the competition finalists.

== Academic teaching ==
Since 2009, Martha teaches the Creative Writing in Spanish program at the University of Toronto, the first program of its kind offered in a foreign language in Canada. Also, since 2010 Martha teaches at Glendon College - York University in Toronto. Courses she teaches at Glendon College include Stylistics and Translation, Literary and Cultural Translation, Advanced Translation Research and Spanish. Martha is a certified translator from English into Spanish by the American Translators Association (ATA).

== Education ==
Martha Batiz has a bachelor's degree in English Literature, a master's degree in Latin American Literature, and a PhD at the University of Toronto, in the Department of Spanish and Portuguese. She holds a Certificate in Creative Writing, from the School of Continuing Studies at the University of Toronto. She also studied Drama and used to combine writing with her work as an actress in Mexico. She produced and played two roles in Ellas solas, which featured The Great Nebula in Orion and Ludlow Fair, by Lanford Wilson. The play ran a successful season from October 1997 to August 1998 in Mexico City. She worked in other theatre plays and in various soap operas. Her academic research has focused in Colonialism, in Latin American Political Theatre and Spanish Golden Age theatre. She lives in Canada.

== See also ==
- A todos los voy a matar, Monterrey, Mexico: Castillo Press, 2000, ISBN 970-20-0087-4
- "La primera taza de cafe", Mexico City: Ariadna Press, 2007, ISBN 970-93094-2-0
- "Boca de Lobo", Estado de Mexico: Instituto Mexiquense de Cultura, 2008, ISBN 978-968-484-723-1
- Boca de Lobo, Santo Domingo: Casa de Teatro (Dominican Republic), 2007

"Mexico Visto desde Lejos", Mexico City: Taurus, 2007.
