= SuperCable =

Defunct Venezuelan-Colombian cable operator

- Type: Cable television operator
- Industry: Telecommunications
- Founded: 1993
- Defunct: 2025
- Headquarters: Venezuela
- Area served: Venezuela; Colombia
- Products: Cable television
- Owner: SuperCable ALK International

SuperCable was a Venezuelan-Colombian cable television operator owned by Supercable ALK International, operating cable television services in key cities of both countries. The company is in process of liquidation.

== History ==
SuperCable was the first coaxial cable company to be established in Venezuela in 1993. As of 1997, it was the largest cable operator. By 2001, it was the third-largest operator in Venezuela by number of subscribers.

In January 2001, it began providing cable services in Colombia, aiming at higher classes, beginning in the Salitre district of Bogotá. In July, it charged a complaint against Digital Latin America for providing services to rival operators. At the time, Hicks, Muse, Tate & Furst was part-owner of DLA and Intercable. The company planned US$50 million in investment in 2002, as well as investing in digital cable services by year-end 2002.

The operator in Venezuela removed BBC World on February 16, 2005, a decision considered to be a "commercial dispute" according to the channel's head of sales Jeff Hazell. SuperCable president Ahmad Lee Khamsi revealed a few days later that the situation could not be resolved due to paying three times the amount of money NetUno did for carrying the channel.

SuperCable obtained the license to broadcast Colombian league matches in 2012, offering to its subscribers seven matches of Categoría Primera A on weekends, one of Categoría Primera B on Mondays and one of the Copa Colombia on Wednesdays.

In April 2019, SuperCable's users in Colombia detected problems in its signal or failure of the same. The technical support rooms were empty, while its customer support line stopped working. According to the National Television Authority, the company had no permit to operate subscription television services in Colombia since 2017.

On March 14, 2025, Venezuelan media regulator CONATEL suspended SuperCable's license and set a 60 day transition period for its subscribers to migrate to other services. Former CONATEL president William Castillo had noted that since his complaint to SuperCable in 2014, the company was operating with obsolete technology, had moved its fundamental services to Colombia and continued exploiting its license in Venezuela irregularly. There are also rumors that SuperCable is up for sale, allowing it to continue under a new name. Even with its license revoked, it continued providing services, but did not give new subscribers. Finally, on August 18, 2025, SuperCable ceased its operations permanently, sending a notification to its subscribers and shutting down its services a few hours later.
