= Mauricio Herrera Ulloa =

Costa Rican journalist and diplomat

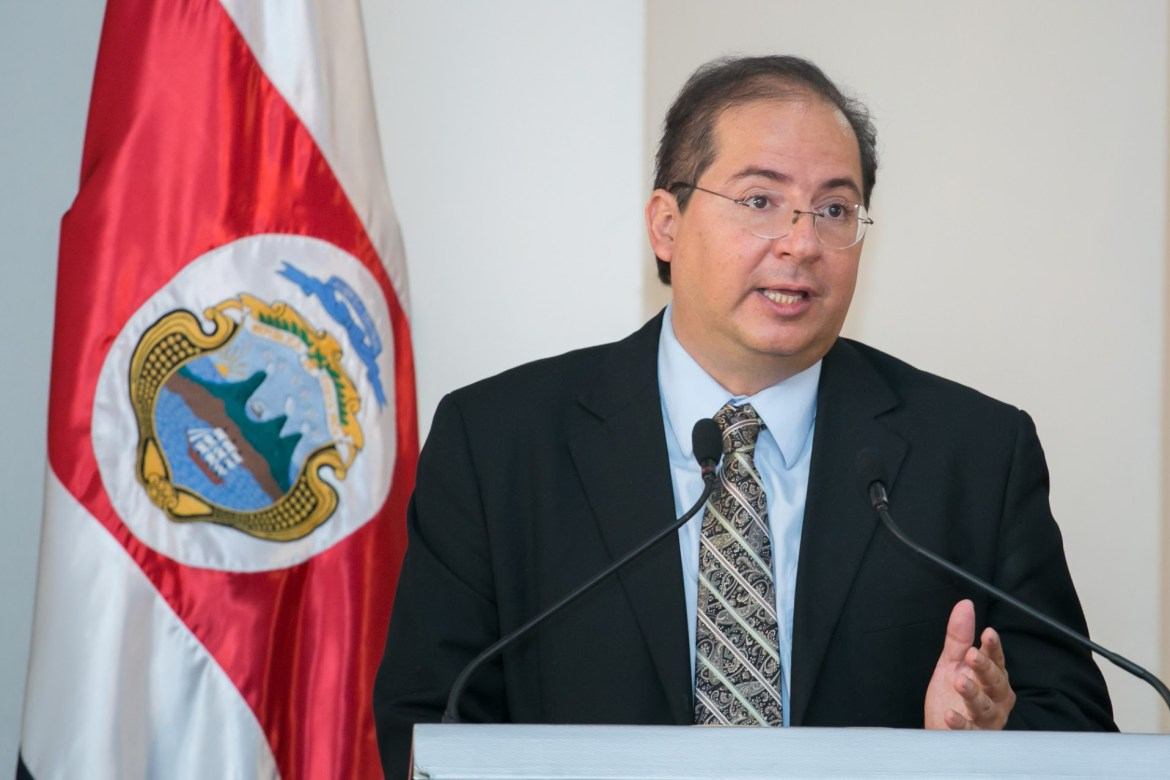
- Herrera being designated as the new Minister of Communication, 2015

Costa Rican Ambassador to Honduras
- In office November 2018 – September 2022
- President: Carlos Alvarado Quesada
- Preceded by: Eugenio Trejos Benavides

Minister of Communication
- In office April 2015 – March 2018
- President: Luis Guillermo Solís
- Preceded by: Carlos Roverssi
- Succeeded by: Juan Carlos Mendoza

Personal details
- Born: Mauricio Herrera Ulloa; 30 January 1970 (age 56)
- Spouse: Laura González Picado (m. 1995)
- Education: Universidad de Costa Rica Universitat de Barcelona Harvard University
- Occupation: Journalist
- Awards: Ortega y Gasset Award (2005), Henry Dunant Journalism Award (1999)

Mauricio Herrera Ulloa is a Costa Rican journalist and was the Costa Rican ambassador to Honduras. Herrera was previously the Minister of Communication under the presidency of Luis Guillermo Solís, the chief editor of the University of Costa Rica's newspaper Semanario Universidad, the Director of Communications at the Center for Justice and International Law, and the defendant of the landmark case Herrera Ulloa vs. Costa Rica before the Inter-American Court of Human Rights.

== Education ==
Herrera graduated with a bachelor's degree in collective communications from the University of Costa Rica in 1992 and a Master's degree in Political Sciences at the same university in 2023. He also earned a Master's degree in Journalism from the University of Barcelona in 2001 and was a Fellow at the Nieman Foundation for Journalism at Harvard University in 2007.

== Herrera Ulloa vs. Costa Rica ==
In 1995, Herrera published a series of articles that addressed a corruption scandal surrounding Félix Przedborski, Costa Rica’s Ambassador to the International Atomic Energy Agency. Originally published by the Financieel-Economische Tijd, the articles published in La Nación reported on Przedborski's alleged involvement in political corruption schemes and other criminal activities. In response to the articles, Przedborski filed two criminal complaints and a civil lawsuit for defamation of a public official against Herrera and La Nación.

After being found innocent in May 1998, in 1999 the Supreme Court of Costa Rica reinstated the criminal defamation charges and ordered a re-trial; Herrera was later found guilty on four counts of criminal defamation. He was ordered to publish a section of the Court’s opinion in La Nación and to remove the links to the four articles in which Przedborski was mentioned by name. Herrera’s name was added to the Judiciary’s Record of Convicted Felons and he and La Nación were ordered to pay the plaintiff’s legal fees and US$200,000.00 in civil monetary damages to Przedborski. In 2001, the Supreme Court rejected an appeal by the applicants.

In March 2001, after a complaint was submitted to the Inter-American Commission of Human Rights, the Commission issued a report in October 2002 requesting Costa Rica to nullify the convictions against Herrera and La Nación. After the government of Costa Rica failed to comply with the measures within the given time-frame, the Commission submitted the case to the Inter-American Court of Human Rights.

In support of Herrera, an amicus curiae was submitted by the Open Society Justice Initiative.

Due to the violations to Herrera’s right to freedom of expression committed by the government of Costa Rica, the Inter-American Court ordered the following:

The court unanimously declares:

1. That the State violated the right to freedom of thought and expression protected under Article 13 of the American Convention on Human Rights (...) to the detriment of Mr. Mauricio Herrera Ulloa

2. That the State violated the right to judicial guarantees (...) to the detriment of Mr. Mauricio Herrera Ulloa

3. That this Judgment constitutes per se a form of reparation

And unanimously decides that:

4. The State must nullify the November 12, 1999 judgment of the Criminal Court of the First Judicial Circuit of San José and all the measures it orders

5. Within a reasonable period of time, the State must adjust its domestic legal system to conform to the provisions of Article 8(2)(h) of the American Convention on Human Rights

6. The State must pay non-pecuniary damages to Mr. Mauricio Herrera Ulloa in the amount of US$ 20,000.00

7. The State must pay Mr. Mauricio Herrera Ulloa the sum of US$ 10,000.00, to defray the expenses of his legal defense in litigating his case before the inter-American system for the protection of human rights

== Project Finland and the Alcatel case ==
"El proyecto Finlandia" and "El caso Alcatel" were a series of reports published by Herrera, Giannina Segnini and Ernesto Rivera on illegal payments given by the Finnish medical company Instrumentarium Medko Medical and the French telecommunications company Alcatel to the former President of Costa Rica and former OAS Secretary-General Rafael Ángel Calderón, the former President of Costa Rica Miguel Ángel Rodríguez, and the former President of Costa Rica and former Managing Director and CEO of the World Economic Forum José María Figueres, among others.

As a result of both investigations, several high-profile individuals were fined and imprisoned and Alcatel was forced to pay $137 million in criminal fines in the U.S. and an added $10 million to the Costa Rican government as part settlement. Instrumentarium Medko Medical has since been acquired by General Electric Healthcare

== Awards ==
- 1995 - Bartolomé Mitre Award, Inter American Press Association
- 1999 - Henry Dunant Journalism Award (First Place), International Committee of the Red Cross, for his report Rehenes de la Guerra (Hostages of War)
- 2005 - Ortega y Gasset Award, alongside his colleagues Ernesto Rivera and Giannina Segnini, for their reports El proyecto Finlandia and El caso Alcatel (Project Finland and The Alcatel Case)
- 2005 - Best Investigative Journalism Report on Corruption in Latin America and the Caribbean, Transparency International
- 2005 - Maria Moors Cabot Award (Special Citation), Columbia University
- 2014 - Premio a la defensa de la libertad de expresión José María Castro Madriz, Colegio de Periodistas de Costa Rica
