= Sanjuana Martínez =

Mexican journalist (born 1963)

Sanjuana Martínez Montemayor
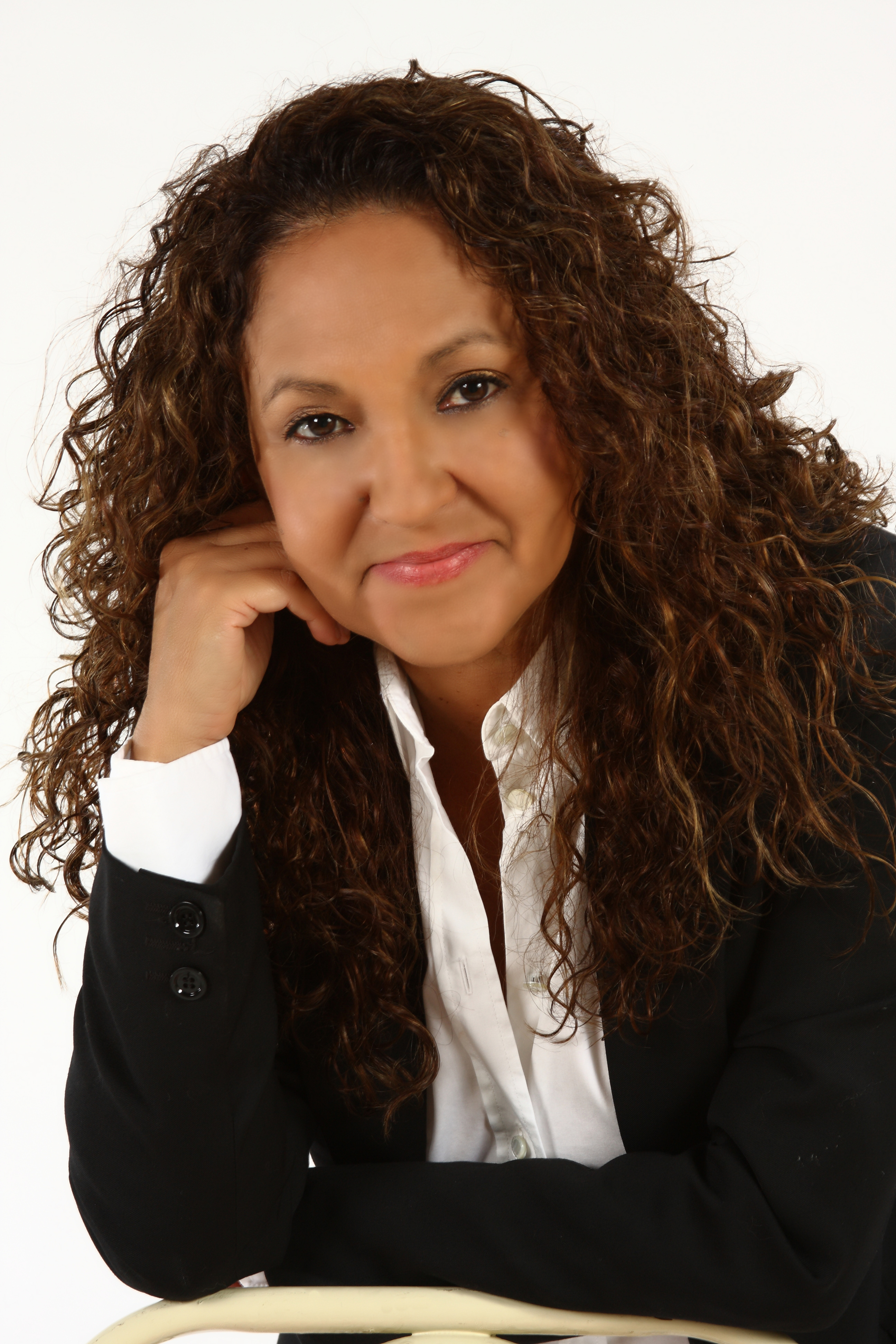
- Born: 1963 (age 62–63); Monterrey, Nuevo León, México
- Occupation: Journalist
- Website: websanjuanamartinez.com.mx

Sanjuana Martínez Montemayor is a Mexican journalist born on 1963 in Monterrey, Nuevo León, México. She received Mexico's National Journalism Award in 2006 and the Ortega y Gasset Award in 2008. Since 2019 she has been the director of Mexico's official news agency, Notimex.

== Journalistic career ==
Martínez studied at the Faculty of Communication Sciences at the Autonomous University of Nuevo León in Nuevo León, Mexico. and did graduate studies at the Universidad Complutense de Madrid. She has investigated issues related to human rights, gender violence, terrorist activity, and organized crime in Mexico, in the United States, and in Europe. She has worked for Diario de Monterrey, Canal 2 de Monterrey, Proceso magazine. She worked for Proceso magazine as a correspondent to Madrid for 18 years.

Martínez has studied and reported on the migratory phenomena of Europe and North Africa. She toured the Mexico–United States border to report on the details of the daily toils of Mexican migrants. As a correspondent she covered the various crises of the Catholic Church and delved into pedophile crimes committed by the clergy. She investigated the case of priest Nicolás Aguilar Rivera, who was accused of abusing several children in Mexico and in the United States.

For her work Martínez has won several awards including the Mexican National Journalism Award in 2006 and the Ortega y Gasset Award in 2008.

In 2006, Martínez received death threats after publishing her book El manto púrpura which focuses on a boy who was allegedly sexually abused by Mexican priest Nicolás Aguilar. On July 5, 2012, she was arrested and detained for 24 hours due to a civil custody dispute. The Committee to Protect Journalists denounced the arrest saying that "the judge who ordered the detention was the subject of critical reporting by Martínez in 2008." Reporters Without Borders described the arrest as abuse of authority because she was detained by armed police, which is unusual in a civil case.

== Director of Notimex ==
On March 21, 2019, she was named director of the Mexican news agency, Notimex. During the first year of her tenure as director, Martínez has been accused of wrongful termination, nepotism, and harassment. In August 2020, the BBC World program, BBC Trending, dedicated an episode to analyze Martinez' handling of Notimex. Presenter Reha Kansara interviewed former and current employees about systematic attacks against them, apparently ordered from upper management and designed to discredit and humiliate those who did not obey Sanjuana Martinez.

On March 30, 2021, the United States Department of State published its annual human rights report, which mentions the concerted efforts by Notimex to discredit journalists and former employees. The report uses information from Article 19, Signa Lab, and Aristegui Noticias showing that Sanjuana Martínez directed attacks against these journalists in a WhatsApp chat group called "Avengers". Manuel Ortiz, former Notimex news director, said that Martínez ordered him to attack journalists that criticized her. Signa Lab also analyzed coordinated Twitter accounts attacks on journalists who questioned Mexican president Andres Manuel López Obrador in his daily press conferences. The president gave his backing to Martínez, decrying the Department of State comments and accusing Article 19 of being part of a conservative movement.

== Selected works ==
=== Books ===
- La cara oculta del Vaticano de Ratzinger a Benedicto XVi : el Papa inquisidor. México, D.F.: Plaza Janés. 2005. ISBN 9789685958554.
- Sí se puede: el movimiento de los hispanos que cambiará a Estados Unidos. México, D.F.: Grijalbo. 2006. ISBN 9780307383594.
- Manto púrpura: pederastia clerical en tiempos del cardenal Norberto Rivera Carrera. México, D.F.: Grijalbo. 2006. ISBN 9789707802513.
- Prueba de fe: la red de cardenales y obispos en la pederastia clerical. México, D.F .: Editorial Planeta Mexicana. 2007. ISBN 9789703707133.
- Se venden niños. México, D.F.: Editorial Planeta Mexicana. 2009. ISBN 9786070701627.
- La frontera del narco. México, D.F.: Editorial Planeta Mexicana. 2011. ISBN 9786070709104.
- Periodismo incómodo: la entrevista reveladora. Monterrey, Nuevo León: Universidad Autónoma de Nuevo León. 2012. ISBN 9786074331110.

=== Co-authored books ===
- Voces de Babel Editorial Alfaguara (2004)
- Montaner, Gina, ed. (2006). "La voluntad es clara: "legalización para todos"". Un día sin inmigrantes: quince voces, una causa. México, D.F.: Grijalbo. ISBN 9789685965071.
- Zepeda Patterson, Jorge, ed. (2008). "Juan Sandoval Íñiguez: cardenal de los ricos". Los intocables. México, D.F.: Editorial Planeta Mexicana. ISBN 9786077000259.
- De los cuates pa' la raza. Editorial Para Leer en Libertad (2010).
- Antología 3 años leyendo en libertad (2013)

== Awards and honors ==
- National Journalism Prize of Mexico 2006
- First National Journalism Prize 2007 awarded by the Journalists Club of Mexico
- Ortega y Gasset Prize awarded by the newspaper El País for "Best Research Paper" version 25 of the Ortega y Gasset Prize for Journalism
- Ronda Award for Investigative Journalism, 2008
- Rodolfo Walsh Award at the 2008 Semana Negra Festival in Gijón, Spain, for best work of nonfiction with her book Prueba de la fe, la red de cardenales y obispos en la pederastia clerical.
- Recognition given by the Feminist Alliance of Nuevo León on the 60th Anniversary of the Universal Declaration of Human Rights "for her prominent role as a journalist to denounce and defend the most vulnerable of society such as children, girls and women." (2008)
- Medal awarded by the Autonomous University of Nuevo León on its 75th anniversary for "the invaluable contribution of her work" (2008)
- National Journalism Award José Pagés Llergo in the category of Human Rights (2009)
- Finalist for the New Journalism Prize by the Gabriel García Márquez Foundation with the report "El Vallenato de Los Tapados" published in Gatopardo magazine (2010)
- Omecihuatl Medal 2011 for her outstanding commitment to the rights of women and for her contribution to building a more just and democratic society.
- First Lorenzo Natali Journalism Prize 2011 awarded by the European Union.
- National Journalism Award 2011 awarded by the Journalists Club of Mexico, in the category of national interest work by spreading investigative reporting.
- Rodolfo Walsh Prize for her book La Frontera del Narco at the Semana Negra of Gijón 2012.
