= César Batiz =

Venezuelan journalist

César Batiz is a Venezuelan investigative journalist. He previously worked with the country's largest newspaper, Últimas Noticias, and is currently the director of Poderopedia and El Pitazo. In many of his writings, he has taken on issues of corruption that have put him at odds with the governments of Hugo Chávez and Nicolás Maduro.

== Education and early career ==
César Batiz graduated from the Universidad del Zulia in 1996. He has worked for the publications Panorama, La Verdad, Últimas Noticias, and La Electricidad de Caracas. In 2008 he returned to Últimas Noticias, the largest-circulation daily in Venezuela as an investigative journalist.

The Fundación Polar published the book La Desgracia de Ayer ("The Misfortune of Yesterday"), which includes a text that Batiz wrote after participating in a Journalism and Memory Workshop taught by Milagros Socorro.

== Sambrano case ==
Últimas Noticias published on February 22, 2009 an article in which Batiz looked into the circumstances surrounding the assassination of journalist Orel Sambrano, who had been writing columns about the rise in drug trafficking in his native city of Valencia.

== Injury in August 2009 demonstration ==
Batiz was one of at least a dozen journalists who were injured by suspected government supporters while participating in a peaceful August 2009 protest in Caracas against proposed legislation that would restrict freedom of expression. The journalists, according to the Committee to Protect Journalists, “were holding banners and handing out leaflets warning against provisions in the bill that prohibits the distribution of content that could cause, among other things, 'terror in children', incite 'hate, aggressiveness' or 'unruliness', 'deform language', or 'threaten the mental or physical health of the people'. They were surrounded by the suspected government supporters, who accused them of being 'oligarchs' and 'enemies of the people', according to CPJ interviews with local journalists. Últimas Noticias Editor Eleazar Díaz Rangel told CPJ that the journalists were wearing press credentials. According to local news reports, the attackers work for the government-owned broadcaster AvilaTV”. According to Globovision, Batiz was struck in the neck and face and taken to a private hospital.

The Committee to Protect Journalists condemned the assault on the journalists. “We are shocked by the vicious attack on journalists who were exercising their right to protest provisions of a bill that could impact their ability to report freely”, said CPJ's Carlos Lauría. “This is not the first time journalists have been attacked by pro-government supporters. Venezuelan authorities must do everything in their power to put an immediate end to these attacks on the press.” The National Assembly ended up approving the bill.

== Investigative journalism course ==
Batiz developed the Advanced Course for Investigative Journalism, which was held in April 2011 in Lima. As part of the course, 18 regional journalists attended lectures on such topics as drug trafficking, mining, and financial institutions, after which each of them conducted a four-month research project. At the event, Batiz discussed his article “Trampas eléctricas”, about irregularities in the Venezuelan government's awarding of energy contracts. El Instituto Prensa y Sociedad (IPYS), which organized the course, recognized Batiz by awarding him a trip to the 2012 Global Investigative Journalism Conference in Kyiv.

== Investigative journalism prize ==
On February 24, 2011, Batiz won first place in the second Concurso Nacional de Reportajes de Investigación Periodística from El Instituto Prensa y Sociedad de Venezuela for his article “Con empresas fantasmas guisaron a Banorte”.

The article uncovered the perpetrators of bank fraud and led to the opening of a judicial inquiry. The jury that awarded Batiz the 21,000-bolivar prize described his article as a classic of investigative journalism and commended Batiz for his mastery of the complexities of the banking industry.

== Ciudad Evolutiva ==
On April 24, 2011, Últimas Noticias published an article by Batiz about the architectural project Ciudad Evolutiva: Experiencia de integración socio-espacial de los barrios informales, which was first presented in the form of a display in Paris in 2010 and had since been seen and written about elsewhere in Europe. The project presented a plan for urban renewal in Venezuela that, Batiz wrote, was ambitious yet achievable.

== Jacinto Lopez case ==
A January 2012 article co-written by Batiz and Jesus Yajure noted that justice had yet to be done in the case of journalist, film producer, and entrepreneur Jacinto Lopez, who had been murdered at age 22 on January 1, 2009. Although two suspects had been positively identified by law-enforcement authorities, they had yet to be arrested.

== Illaramendi case ==
On February 10, 2012, Batiz reported that Jose Rojas, former Venezuelan finance minister and former Venezuelan representative to the World Bank and International Monetary Fund, had denied any connection to a “fraudulent scheme” engineered by Venezuelan-American financier Illaramendi Francisco and involving funds from Petróleos de Venezuela, S.A. (PDVSA). Illarramendi was being tried in the U.S. for the loss of over $300 million managed by Illarramendi's companies. Batiz reconstructed Illarramendi's movements, actions, and connections to Rojas over a period of years.

Batiz reported on May 24, 2012 that although Illaramendi was currently on trial in the U.S. for using $480 million in PDVSA retirement funds to finance a Ponzi scheme, and had pleaded guilty 14 months earlier to having done just that, the First Criminal Hearings Court in the Metropolitan Area had declared that there was no case against him under Venezuelan law.

== Chávez re-election campaign ==
Batiz promoted TuVotomóvil, a voter-participation project, in June 2012.

He covered a Chávez campaign appearance in July 2012.
