= Baby Bátiz =

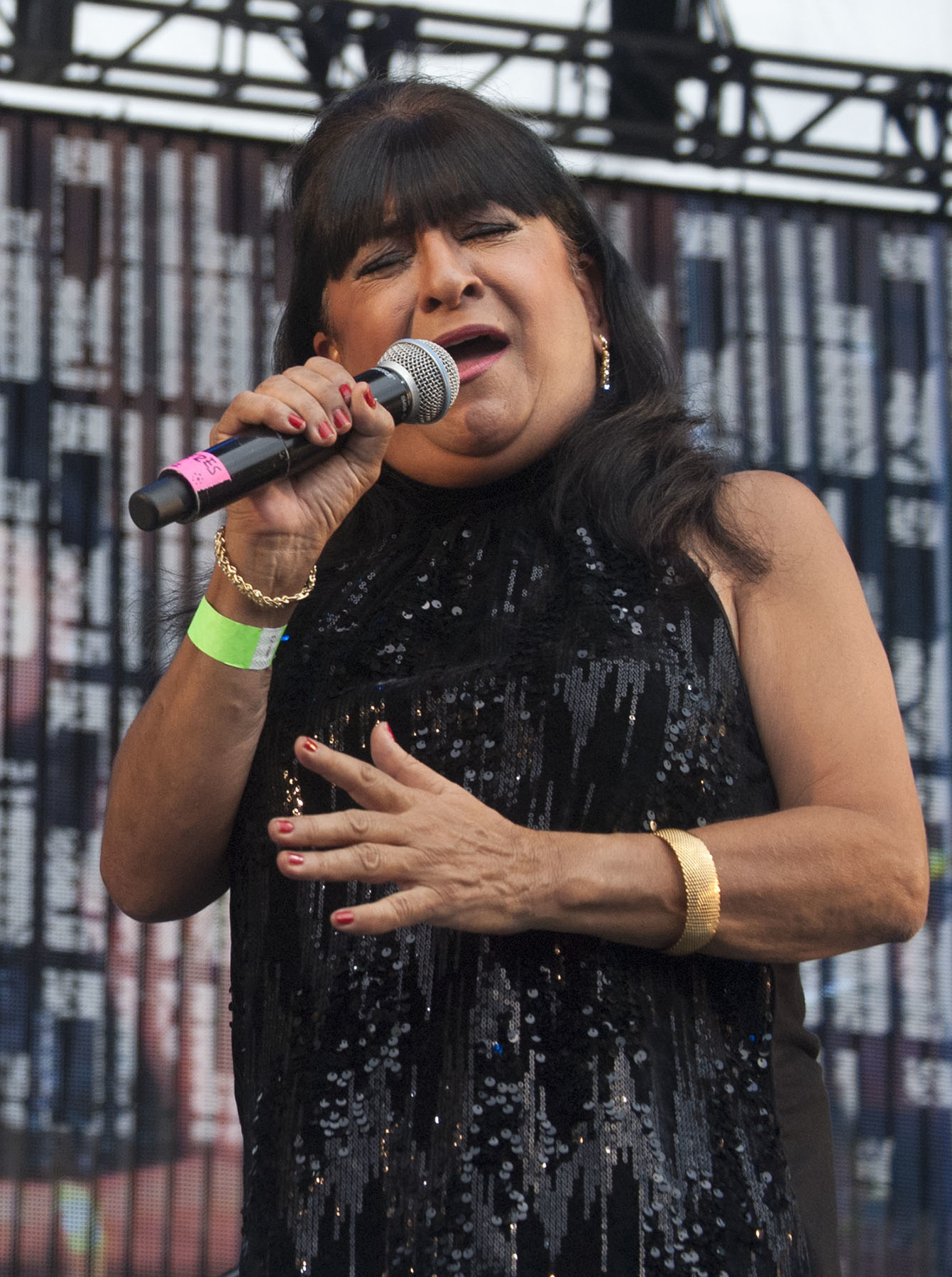
- Baby Bátiz in Mexico City, 2018

Background information
- Birth name: María Esther Medina Núñez
- Also known as: Baby Bátiz
- Born: November 24, 1949 (age 75)
- Origin: Tijuana, Baja California, Mexico
- Genres: Blues, soul, rock and roll
- Occupation: Singer
- Years active: 1960–present

María Esther Medina Núñez also known as Baby Bátiz (born November 24, 1949, in Tijuana) is a Mexican singer. Her work is focused on blues, soul and rock and roll genres.

== Bio ==
Baby Bátiz began her musical career at the age of eleven singing in Los TJ's, in which she performed versions of songs from genres such as rock and roll and ballads. In her musical training, due to the context border with the United States, Bátiz grew up listening to rock, blues and soul as well. Between 1964 and 1968 she traveled on vacation to Mexico City to work in the so-called singing cafes of the Mexican capital where his brother Javier Bátiz was already performing. Javier and Baby moved to Mexico City in a context of a "wave" of rock and roll and other rhythms bands coming from Tijuana. In 1964 she recorded and published her first album Aconséjame mama, the same one in which she had to sing with a different style for commercial reasons than she used to influenced by artists like Aretha Franklin. The album was not promoted, among other factors, because Baby Bátiz did not come of age.

In the second half of the 1960s, Baby Bátiz's style shifted from rock and roll ballads to a style more rooted in genres such as soul and blues, which she would promote among the Mexico City public. She participated in television programs such as Operation Ja-Ja and Discotheque Orfeon A Go-gó. In the 70s she would join Tequila and Las Loquettes rock bands. In her career she has published six LP records. She has collaborated on a dozen of her brother Javier's albums. In addition to her stage career Baby Batiz has been a singer for different TV ads and has been a showgirl and studio singer on records by Yuri, Lupita D'Alessio, Timbiriche, among others.

== Discography ==
- Aconséjame mamá (1965)
- Demasiado tarde/Un lugar cerca del sol (1971)
- Abrázame bésame (1973)
- Those were the days (1998)
- Grandes Musicales (Andrew Loyd Webber) (1999)
- En Vivo en el Monumento a la Revolución (2003)
- De veras me atrapaste (2004)
- Antología (2010)
