= Responses to the Venezuelan presidential crisis =

International responses to 2019–2023 political crisis

Countries recognizing presidential power during the Venezuelan presidential crisis as of 5 January 2022, before Guaidó's interim government dissolution was made effective: Venezuela Neutral No statement Recognize Guaidó Support opposition National Assembly Recognize Maduro

During the Venezuelan presidential crisis concerning the legitimate President of Venezuela, reactions and responses to the crisis were greatly divided.

On 10 January 2019, Venezuela's opposition-majority National Assembly declared that incumbent Nicolás Maduro's 2018 reelection was invalid, and its president, Juan Guaidó, said that he was prepared to assume the acting presidency. On 23 January 2019, Guaidó and the National Assembly declared he was acting president, who took the presidential oath. By vote of the opposition coalition that had previously supported Guaidó's claim, the Guaidó interim government dissolved on 5 January 2023.

Some countries and organizations recognized Guaidó as acting president, while others recognized Maduro; some expressed neutrality, and some supported the National Assembly without endorsing Guaidó.

== Reactions ==
Countries recognizing presidential power during the Venezuelan presidential crisis as of 8 February 2019, the year of Guaidó's height of recognition: Venezuela Neutral countries No statement Countries recognizing Guaidó Countries supporting the opposition National Assembly Countries recognizing Maduro

Washington, D.C. public assembly

After Maduro's inauguration in January, United States National Security Advisor John Bolton, Canadian Prime Minister Justin Trudeau, and Brazilian President Jair Bolsonaro called him an illegitimate dictator.

International demonstrations occurred on both sides. Hundreds of thousands of Venezuelans protested in more than 70 cities around the world in support of Guaidó, and demonstrations in support of Maduro also took place.

=== Governments ===
==== International ====
Argentina: During the presidency of Mauricio Macri, Argentina recognized Guaidó as the legitimate President of Venezuela and repeatedly denounced Maduro as a 'dictatorship'. After the 2019 elections, when Alberto Fernández took office, Argentina stopped recognizing Guaidó as President and withdrew credentials to his ambassador in the country. Argentina, however, refused to recognize Nicolás Maduro's envoy as well. After Guaidó and other opposition representatives were refused entry into the National Assembly in January 2020, Argentina labeled the move by Maduro's supporters as "unacceptable". In a July 2020 report by the United Nations High Commission on Human Rights, Argentina toughened its position on the Maduro's government and signed a petition for fresh elections and denounced violations to human rights in the country.

Brazil: Brazilian President Jair Bolsonaro said that he would do all he could to "re-establish order, democracy and freedom" in Venezuela. The Bolsonaro administration declared on 12 January 2019 that it recognizes Juan Guaidó as the legitimate president of Venezuela.

Canada: During a town hall at Brock University at St. Catharines, Ontario, Prime Minister Justin Trudeau, denounced Maduro as an 'illegitimate dictator' and said anyone should stand up and condemn the Maduro government, which he said has been responsible for "terrible oppression" and a humanitarian crisis unseen in South America for decades.

China: China was originally forthright in lending support to Maduro with Ministry of Foreign Affairs spokeswoman Hua Chunying stating that China "supports efforts made by the Venezuelan government to protect the country's sovereignty, independence, and stability" and "opposes foreign forces from interfering into Venezuela affairs". In early February there were reports of China beginning to take a more neutral position for fear of alienating potential relationships with major South American countries who support Guaidó, and also possibly due to frustration with Venezuela's inability to repay the debt it owed, China having lent Venezuela US$67 billion. Geng Shuang, a Chinese Foreign Ministry spokesman, stated that China's trade deals would not be affected "no matter how circumstances change," and further stated that China has been in talks with "all sides". There also has been evidence of discontent in China's public over the amounts of money that have been given to Venezuela, which some state would be better used in China. According to the Wall Street Journal, China has been holding meetings with diplomats from the government of Guaidó to discuss Chinese investments in Venezuela; a Chinese Ministry of Foreign Affairs spokeswoman denied these claims, stating that it is "false information". On 8 March, Foreign Minister Wang Yi reaffirmed China's opposition to the issued sanctions, and support for dialogue between Venezuela's opposition and government. On 5 June, General Secretary of the Chinese Communist Party Xi Jinping said that his country is ready to work with the international community to play a constructive role with Venezuela and help the country to get back on a normal development path as soon as possible while opposing foreign interference, unilateral sanctions, the use of force, or threats of the use of force when it comes to the current situation. Moreover, Chinese leader Xi Jinping said that the current crisis should be solved by the ruling party and the opposition through inclusive political dialogue and consultation within the framework of Venezuela's constitution.

Iran: Iran's Ministry of Foreign Affairs spokesman stated that Iran "supports Venezuela's [Maduro] government and nation against any kind of foreign interference in its internal affairs".

Russia: Russia has been a vocal supporter of Nicolás Maduro, as well as being a military and economic ally since under predecessor Hugo Chávez. Russia has made shows of force, such as flying two Tu-160 nuclear capable bombers to Venezuela. In addition to direct support Russia also acts vocal supporter of Maduro in the UN, and has been one of the country's principal arms dealers. Domestic reactions in Russia to the situation have been mixed with some publications praising Russia's support of Maduro and its willingness to confront the US, and others criticizing economic aid to Venezuela which they deem an economic black hole. The Russian national oil company Rosneft has invested heavily in numerous joint ventures with Venezuela's state-run oil company, PDVSA. Rosneft has made direct investments in six Venezuelan oil fields totaling around US$2.5 billion. Rosneft has also acted as a major lender, and oil marketer for Venezuela aiding it in selling 225,000 barrels per day in crude supplies overseas. It has made large loans to the company with US$2.7 billion outstanding; to offset risk PDVSA has pledged a 49.9% stake of subsidiary Citgo as collateral for loans outstanding. On 5 June 2019, following talks with Chinese leader Xi Jinping, Russian President Vladimir Putin wished the situation in Venezuela to stabilize.

Turkey: Turkish President Recep Tayyip Erdoğan phoned Maduro to offer support. According to Haaretz, "Erdogan pledged to invest in Venezuelan's failing economy during the trip, with Maduro saying that Turkish businesses would pump some 4.5 billion euros into the country." On 1 April, Foreign Minister Mevlüt Çavuşoğlu told his Venezuelan counterpart Jorge Arreaza that Turkey will continue supporting the Maduro government and deepen its cooperation "in all fields" despite pressure from the United States. However, in August 2019, Ziraat Bank, Turkey's largest bank by assets, stopped offering services to the Central Bank of Venezuela.

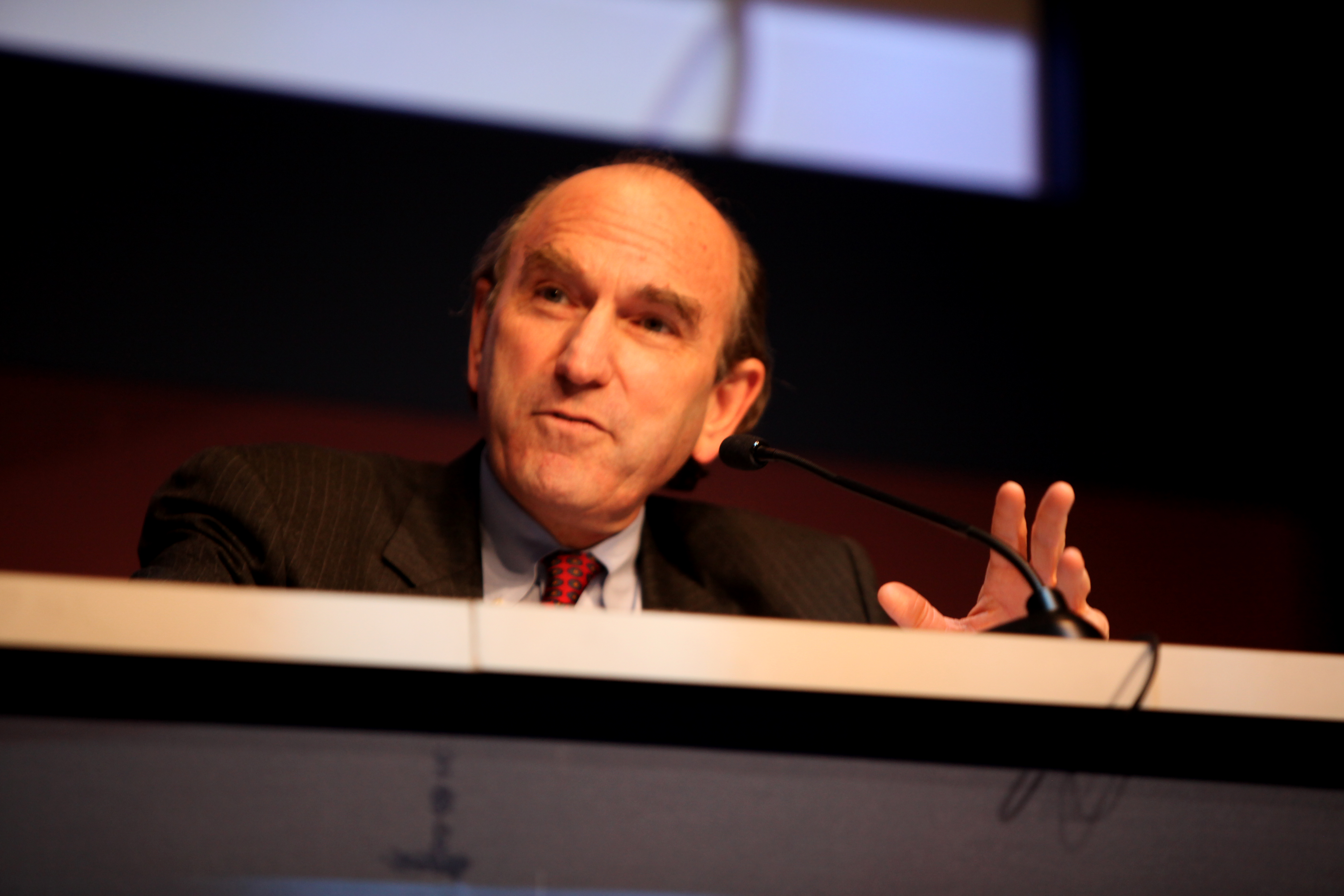
Elliott Abrams, a former foreign policy official under the Reagan and Bush administrations, was appointed the United States' Special Envoy to Venezuela.

United States (US): On 15 January, US President Donald Trump was reported to be deliberating whether to officially recognize Guaidó, which he did on 23 January. US Vice President Mike Pence released a video on 23 January in support of Guaidó and the people of Venezuela. The US was the first nation to recognize Guaidó after he swore an oath on the 23rd, with Trump and Pence sending their support and solidarity as well as the official recognition; other countries followed suit. In response Maduro ordered the expulsion of US diplomats, giving them 72 hours to leave Venezuela. The US said it would not close its embassy, stating their diplomatic relationship was with Guaidó's government, and holding Maduro responsible for the safety of its staff. On 26 January 2019, only hours before the deadline, the Maduro government backtracked on its expulsion order, giving US diplomats another 30 days. Secretary of State Mike Pompeo appointed Elliott Abrams as US Special Envoy to Venezuela. On 28 January, the US imposed sanctions on PDVSA. The US accounted for 41% of purchases from the company, which is the biggest input to Venezuela's economy. On 22 February—the same day as the Venezuela Aid Live concert, which Maduro said was part of an effort to topple him—Venezuela extended the deadline for US diplomats to leave by another 30 days. On 12 March, the US announced that it was withdrawing its diplomats from Caracas. The United States stopped recognizing Guaidó's presidential claim in January 2023, following the vote of opposition groups to dissolve the interim government. A spokesperson for the White House and State Department said that the US "recognized the National Assembly elected in 2015, which Guaidó had led, as Venezuela's 'only remaining democratically elected institution'."

Vatican City: Corriere della Sera cited a leaked copy of a private letter reportedly sent by Pope Francis to Maduro on 7 February 2019 in reply to a letter Maduro wrote asking the pope to mediate. Pope Francis' response—addressed to "His Excellency Mr Nicolás Maduro Moros"—said that what had been agreed in earlier negotiations had not been followed. Those conditions, still applicable, were: open a channel for humanitarian aid, hold free elections, free political prisoners, and re-establish the constitutionally-elected National Assembly. According to Andrea Gagliarducci, writing for the Catholic News Agency, in not addressing Maduro as president, the Pope was agreeing with the stance taken by the Venezuelan bishops, who held that Maduro's election was illegitimate.

==== Intergovernmental organizations ====
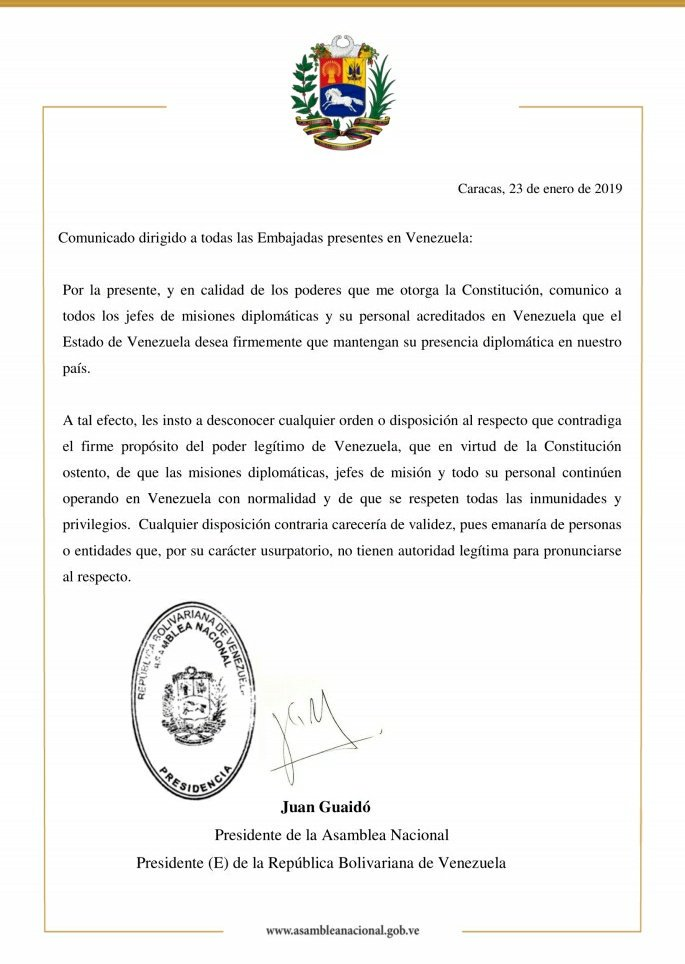
Guaidó communication to embassies in Venezuela: I am responsible for telling them that we are a sovereign nation and will continue to maintain diplomatic relations with all the countries of the world

European Union (EU): More than half of its member states, including the United Kingdom, France, Germany, and Spain, said they support Guaidó; earlier, the EU issued a declaration saying it "fully supports the National Assembly as the democratically elected institution whose powers need to be restored and respected". On 4 February 19 countries of the European Union made a joint declaration supporting and recognizing Juan Guaidó as acting president of Venezuela, asking that he "summons free, just and democratic presidential elections". Italy's stance prevented this from becoming an official EU position. The EU condemned the Constituent Assembly stripping of Guaidó's parliamentary immunity, calling the action a "serious violation of the Venezuelan constitution, as well as of the rule of law and separation of power". The EU's recognition of Guaidó's presidency was withdrawn (although it was never declared by the whole EU block in the first place because Italy vetoed) in January 2021. The United Kingdom, which left the EU the previous year, continued to recognize him, and the European Parliament reaffirmed its recognition of Guaidó as president.

Lima Group: On 11 and 12 January, several nations of the Lima Group released statements independent from the international body, including their nations' agreement to not recognize Maduro. The Maduro government said that these countries had "rectified" themselves to support him as president. They had not; the non-intervention statements were seen as a concession to prevent rash action by Maduro after he broadly threatened the group. Venezuelan Foreign Minister, Jorge Arreaza, gave a different statement to the vice presidential office, saying that Venezuela had received diplomatic notices from some Lima Group countries about the original dispute. Colombia's statement reiterated the group's resolution and pledged to support "the restoration of democracy and constitutional order in Venezuela", as well as saying that they did not have a position on the territorial dispute. Arreaza contradicted the statement from his vice president's office that the Lima Group recognized Maduro's government, and doubled Maduro's 48-hour demand period for non-intervention for the remaining countries after it expired. He also advocated peaceful diplomatic discussion with neighboring countries. The group—except for Mexico, which called for non-intervention in Venezuelan internal affairs—continued to back the Guaidó government, with the Foreign Minister of Chile pledging "unlimited support".

International Conference on the Situation in Venezuela: Mexico and Uruguay announced an international conference for countries with a neutral position in Montevideo on 7 February. Uruguay has since recognized Maduro as president, with foreign minister Rodolfo Nin Novoa comparing the worsening situation to the United States' rationale for the Iraq War. (Note: While Uruguay still recognizes Maduro as President until 2020, on 13 February the Uruguayan government released a joint statement with the Argentine government (who recognizes Guaidó) calling for new elections.) In April, Beatriz Becerra said that the international conference had been of no use, given that there had been no progress on the 90-day deadline for elections that the group established when it was formed; she stated that the Contact Group should be terminated and efforts should be coordinated through the Lima Group.

Mercosur: During a July 2019 summit in Santa Fe, Argentina, the bloc called for "free, fair and transparent presidential elections, as soon as possible" in Venezuela. The presidents of the four member countries signed a statement expressing concern "for the grave crisis that Venezuela is going through, which is seriously affecting the humanitarian situation and human rights." Venezuela's membership of the bloc has been suspended indefinitely since 1 December 2016 in response to the "rupture of the democratic order" in that country.

Organization of American States (OAS): The OAS approved a resolution on 10 January 2019 "to not recognize the legitimacy of Nicolas Maduro's new term". Luis Almagro, Secretary General of the OAS, recognized Guaidó on 23 January. In an extraordinary OAS session called for 24 January 16 countries including the US recognized Guaidó as president, but they did not achieve the majority needed for a resolution. Almagro held countries who remained neutral on the presidential crisis responsible for the massacre, suffering, and human rights violations in Venezuela. In October 2022, a bloc of leftist OAS member states led a motion to remove Tarre's representation in the organization. Out of 35 members, 19 nations voted in favor of the motion and 4 against. The motion fell short of the 24 votes required for a two-thirds majority.

United Nations (UN): A special meeting of the Security Council was held on 26 January 2019 to discuss Venezuela; no consensus was reached. Secretary General António Guterres called for dialogue to ease tensions. Delegates from Maduro's government continued to represent Venezuela at the United Nations. On 28 February the Security Council voted on two draft resolutions: one from the US calling for new elections in Venezuela, the entry of humanitarian aid, and the recognition of Guaidó as interim president; the other from Russia calling for dialogue between the Maduro government and the opposition in line with the Montevideo initiative of Mexico and Uruguay. Neither proposal was adopted. The US draft received majority support (nine votes in favor to three against), (Note: In Favor: Belgium, Dominican Republic, France, Germany, Kuwait, Peru, Poland, United Kingdom, United States – Against: China, Russian Federation, South Africa – Abstentions: Equatorial Guinea, Indonesia, Ivory Coast (9–3–3)) but was vetoed by Russia and China. The Russian draft received four votes in favor and seven votes against. (Note: In Favor: China, Equatorial Guinea, Russian Federation, South Africa – Against: Belgium, France, Germany, Peru, Poland, United Kingdom, United States – Abstentions: Dominican Republic, Indonesia, Ivory Coast, Kuwait (4–7–4)) In December 2021, the United Nations General Assembly approved the diplomatic credentials for the Maduro government's United Nations representative Samuel Moncada.

=== National organizations ===
Tibisay Lucena, president of the National Electoral Council (CNE), described Guaidó's declaration as a coup d'état and said that his actions were carried out by a group of foreign governments, subordinated to the guidelines of the United States government that seeks to undermine Venezuela's sovereignty. She also defended the 2018 Venezuelan presidential election results, saying that "the positions of popular representation are elected by the people".

The Catholic Church in Venezuela, organized by the Episcopal Conference of Venezuela, released a statement by Monsignor Ovidio Pérez Morales on 15 January 2019 saying "The Church in Venezuela, united to its Bishops in communion with the Pope, declare the socialist-communist regime illegitimate and stand in solidarity with the Venezuelan people to rescue democracy, freedom, and justice. Trusting in God, they support the National Assembly". Cardinal Porras declared: "This regime always calls for dialogue when it's up to its neck in water but when the water level falls it forgets about it."

Members of the Constituent National Assembly stated that Guaidó's actions on 23 February solidified their support of Maduro.

=== Social media ===
Despite internet blocks in Venezuela, by midday local time, the Twitter hashtag "#23Ene"—shorthand for "23 de Enero", Spanish for 23 January—was trending worldwide. Later in the day, five of the top ten trends were protest-related: "Venezuela", "Juan Guaidó", "#23Ene", "#GritemosConBrio", and "#Guaido". With protests continuing to the next day, "#24Ene" also trended.

It was reported in the late evening that Instagram had removed the "Verified" label from Maduro's account, instead placing one on Guaidó's account; this was denied by Instagram. Guaidó's description had also been updated to include "President of the Bolivarian Republic of Venezuela". The following day, Facebook un-verified Maduro.

In January 2019, the Associated Press said that Maduro's administration and Venezuela's state-run media sought to discredit Guaidó with video footage "to paint [him] as a liar and a fraud". Venezuela's Communications Minister, Jorge Rodríguez, said he had proof of a meeting between Guaidó and United Socialist Party of Venezuela members, Diosdado Cabello and Freddy Bernal, in which Guaidó allegedly said he was under pressure from the United States. According to Guaidó, the meeting never happened. Rodríguez' proof came as collated short video clips. One clip shows Cabello walking through a hotel lobby, then cuts to show a man in a hooded sweatshirt (alleged to be Guaidó) entering and crossing the hall in the same direction as Cabello. The hooded man is heavily obscured and blurry, and it is impossible to identify the person. Within minutes of Venezuela's state-run media posting the video, the hashtag #GuaidoChallenge went viral, trending worldwide. The hashtag made fun of the video posted by Rodríguez as supposed proof of this meeting.

As a protest about what they called foreign intervention, pro-Maduro social-media users used the hashtag '#HandsOffVenezuela' to share videos, pictures, and comments.

China, a supporter of Maduro, has censored information about the crisis according to Radio Free Asia. Reports from China state that Chinese citizens who criticize Maduro on social media are punished or fined, with economist He Jiangbing saying that the Chinese government is "trying to prevent another color revolution ... because Venezuela and China are very similar".

Turkish pro-government media outlets criticized European countries for issuing an eight-day election ultimatum, and called the presidential crisis "a foreign-linked coup d'état." It also likened Juan Guaidó to Egypt's president, Abdel Fattah el-Sisi, who played a significant role in overthrowing the Turkey-backed Islamist regime of Mohamed Morsi in 2013 following mass protests against the latter's rule. When the French president, Emmanuel Macron, visited Egypt, Turkish newspapers Güneş and Sabah accused the French president of possessing hypocritical stances on democracy for describing Maduro's re-election as "illegitimate" but then shaking hands with a leader (el-Sisi) "who massacres pro-democracy protesters" and "[holds] thousands of political prisoners in Egyptian jails." Columnist İsmail Yaşa compared Maduro's re-election to el-Sisi's election in 2014, saying that Maduro's 67% of the vote proved that he was "democratically elected," and that since el-Sisi won his election with 97% of the vote despite a turnout perceived as low, election boycotts, and limited opposition, this proved in his words that it was a "sham."

== Recognition ==
Nations recognizing presidential power: Venezuela Neutral No statement Recognize Guaidó Support IV National Assembly Recognize Maduro

=== Recognition of Guaidó acting presidency ===
==== Foreign states ====
1. Afghanistan
2. Albania
3. Andorra
4. Australia
5. Austria
6. Bahrain
7. Belgium
8. Benin
9. Bhutan
10. Botswana
11. Brunei
12. Bulgaria (Note: The Bulgarian Ministry of Foreign Affairs has recognized Guaidó, but the President of Bulgaria, has issued a statement condemning the foreign ministry's position, critisicing the EU's recognition of Guaidó and urging neutrality)
13. Cameroon
14. Cape Verde
15. Chad
16. Costa Rica
17. Croatia
18. Czech Republic
19. Democratic Republic of the Congo
20. Denmark
21. Ecuador
22. El Salvador (Note: El Salvador changed its affiliation several times. Initially supporting Maduro, an official statement released on 24 January said they recognized Guaidó; later that day another statement was released, reiterating their backing of Maduro. After the 2019 election saw the victory of President Nayib Bukele, El Salvador then backed Guaidó.)
23. Estonia
24. Eswatini
25. Fiji
26. Finland
27. France
28. Gabon
29. Georgia
30. Germany
31. Ghana
32. Greece
33. Guatemala
34. Haiti
35. Honduras
36. Hungary
37. Iceland
38. Ireland
39. Israel
40. Japan
41. Jordan
42. Kiribati
43. Latvia
44. Lesotho
45. Lithuania
46. Luxembourg
47. Malawi
48. Malta
49. Marshall Islands
50. Mauritius
51. Micronesia
52. Monaco
53. Montenegro
54. Morocco
55. Nauru
56. Netherlands
57. North Macedonia
58. Panama
59. Papua New Guinea
60. Paraguay
61. Poland
62. Portugal
63. Romania
64. Rwanda
65. Samoa
66. São Tomé and Príncipe
67. Saudi Arabia
68. Senegal
69. Seychelles
70. Sierra Leone
71. Singapore
72. Slovakia
73. Slovenia
74. South Korea
75. South Sudan
76. Spain
77. Sweden
78. Togo
79. Tonga
80. Tunisia
81. Tuvalu
82. Ukraine
83. Vanuatu

===== Non-UN states =====
- Kosovo

==== Intergovernmental organizations ====
- European Parliament
- Organization of American States
- Andean Parliament
- NATO
- Lima Group (Note: Excluding Mexico.)
- PROSUR
- G7

==== International organizations ====
- Inter-American Development Bank
- Socialist International

==== Domestic organizations ====
- Episcopal Conference of Venezuela
- Fedecámaras
- Institutional Military Front
- Venezuelan Liberation Front
- Venezuelan Workers' Federation

=== Recognition of opposition National Assembly ===
==== Foreign states ====
1. Argentina (Note: Under the government of Mauricio Macri, Argentina endorsed Guaidó; however, Argentina had a change of government in December 2019, and after the 2020 AN elections, the new Argentine government of Alberto Fernández revoked their recognition of Guaidó's designated ambassador because of his diminishing power. However, the Fernández government was notably careful in not recognizing Maduro. Furthermore, Fernández's Foreign Minister Felipe Solá tweeted in favor of recovering the normality and condemned the move of blocking Guaidó entry to the National Assembly as 'unacceptable')
2. Canada
3. Cyprus
4. Guyana
5. Italy
6. Jamaica
7. Liberia
8. Liechtenstein
9. Moldova
10. Norway
11. United Kingdom
12. United States
13. Uruguay

===== Non-UN states =====
- Taiwan

==== Intergovernmental organizations ====
- European Union
- Mercosur

=== Recognition of Maduro presidency ===
==== Foreign states ====
1. Algeria
2. Angola
3. Azerbaijan
4. Belarus
5. Bolivia (Note: Under the government of Evo Morales, Bolivia supported Maduro, but changed affiliation after Morales' government resignation and the assumption of presidency and senate by the opposition under Jeanine Áñez in November 2019. After the victory of the Morales-aligned Luis Arce in the 2020 Bolivian general election, Bolivia reestablished official relations with the government of Nicolás Maduro.)
6. Burundi
7. Cambodia
8. Central African Republic
9. China
10. Colombia (Note: Under the government of Iván Duque, Colombia recognized Guaidó as president of Venezuela. After the election of Gustavo Petro, relations between Colombia and Venezuela were reestablished, and Petro made a state visit to Caracas.)
11. Cuba
12. Dominica
13. Equatorial Guinea
14. Eritrea
15. Ethiopia
16. Gambia
17. Guinea
18. Guinea-Bissau
19. Iran
20. Kazakhstan
21. Kenya
22. Kuwait
23. Kyrgyzstan
24. Laos
25. Mali
26. Mauritania
27. Mongolia
28. Mozambique
29. Myanmar
30. Nicaragua
31. North Korea
32. Qatar
33. Russia
34. St. Lucia
35. Saint Kitts and Nevis
36. Saint Vincent and the Grenadines
37. South Africa
38. Sudan
39. Suriname
40. Syria
41. Tajikistan
42. Tanzania
43. Thailand
44. Turkey
45. Turkmenistan
46. Uganda
47. United Arab Emirates
48. Uzbekistan
49. Vietnam
50. Yemen
51. Zambia
52. Zimbabwe

===== Non-UN states =====
- Abkhazia
- Palestine
- Sahrawi Republic
- South Ossetia

==== Intergovernmental organizations ====
- Foro de São Paulo

==== International organizations ====
- ALBA
- SADC

==== Domestic organizations ====
- PDVSA

==== Armed groups ====
- Colectivos
  - La Piedrita
  - Tupamaro
- National Liberation Army
- Wagner Group (disputed)
- Hezbollah

=== Vocal neutrality ===
Several nations called specifically for non-intervention and, without supporting either side, asked for diplomatic discussions to be held to move forward.

==== Foreign states ====
1. Antigua and Barbuda
2. Angola
3. Armenia
4. Barbados
5. Belize
6. Dominican Republic
7. Grenada
8. India
9. Indonesia
10. Ivory Coast
11. Malaysia
12. Maldives
13. Mexico
14. Namibia
15. Nepal
16. New Zealand
17. Pakistan
18. Palau
19. Peru (Note: Previously recognizing Guaidó as president, Peru had a change of government in July 2021, and the government of president Pedro Castillo announced that it did not recognize "any legitimate authority in Venezuela since 5 January 2020. The government further stated that the Lima Group had not been necessary to make further announcements.)
20. San Marino
21. Serbia
22. Sri Lanka
23. Switzerland
24. Trinidad and Tobago
25. Vatican City

==== Intergovernmental organizations ====
- Caribbean Community

== Public opinion ==
Reuters has described previous polls in Venezuela as being "notoriously controversial and divergent". The Wall Street Journal described Datanálisis as "a respected pollster in Venezuela" in March 2019.

Stratfor reported Maduro lost support of working-class Venezuelans as government handouts subsided; the opposition to Maduro has proposed plans to end the economic crisis, resulting in increased support for them. The Wall Street Journal reported that barrios are turning against Maduro in "a shift born of economic misery and police violence", adding that "many blame government brutality for the shift". Pollster Datanálisis found that, among the poorest 20% of Venezuelans, Maduro's support had fallen to 18% in February 2019 from 40% two years earlier.

An April survey of 1,000 voters conducted by Hercon Consultores found that 78% of Venezuelans recognized Guaidó as interim president.

An 11–14 March 2019 survey of 1,100 people in 16 Venezuelan states and 32 cities by Meganálisis found that 89% of respondents want Maduro to leave the presidency.

A Datanálisis poll on 4 March found Guaidó approval at 61%, and Maduro's at all-time low of 14%. Guaidó would win 77% in an election to Maduro's 23%.

A 2019 Gallup poll in Colombia, published in March, showed 80% of Colombians have a favorable opinion of Guaidó, 97% have a negative opinion of Maduro, and 45% believe the United States military should intervene in Venezuela. President Iván Duque Márquez of Venezuela's neighboring Colombia was among the early supporters of Guaidó; an earlier (7–11 February) Colombian survey of 1,008 individuals in more than 20 cities, with a margin of error of 3%, found that his popularity had surged 15 points, partly because of his position on Venezuela, and that 70% of Colombians had a favorable view of Guaidó, and 93% had a negative impression of Maduro.

Surveys between 30 January and 1 February by Meganálisis recorded that 84.6% of respondents recognized Guaidó as interim president, 11.2% were undecided and 4.1% believe that Maduro was president. The study of 1,030 Venezuelans was conducted in 16 states and 32 cities.

A telephone survey of 999 Venezuelans by Hercon from 25 to 30 January showed that 81.9% of respondents recognized Guaidó as president, 13.4% said Maduro was president and 4.6% were undecided. A Meganálisis survey of 870 Venezuelans between 24 and 25 January reported that 83.7% of respondents recognized Guaidó as the legitimate president, 11.4% could not decide who was president and 4.8% recognized Maduro as president.

A pre-23 January 2019 poll by Hinterlaces, a pollster headed by Constituent National Assembly member Oscar Schemel and described as pro-Maduro, reported that 86% of Venezuelans would oppose a military intervention by the United States.

Surveys of 900 people between 19 and 20 January by Meganálisis reported that 81.4% hoped that Guaidó would be sworn in on 23 January while 84.2% supported a transitional government to replace Maduro's government. A telephone survey of 1,000 registered voters by Venezuelan pollster Hercon, conducted from 15 to 19 January 2019, reported 79.9% of respondents agreeing with Maduro leaving the presidency. Regarding the National Assembly, 68.8% of respondents rated their work as being positive while 15.6% rated their actions as negative. When asked if they agreed with the National Assembly swearing in Guaidó as interim president, 68.6% agreed and 19.4% disagreed.

According to Datanálisis, in early 2019, 63% of Venezuelans believed that a change of government was possible. Fourteen months later, in May 2020, after the Macuto Bay raid, the percentage decreased to 20%.

Public support for Guaidó decreased in May 2020, with 88.3% of respondents to a Meganálisis poll saying that they believed that Guaidó was not suited to govern Venezuela.

== See also ==
- International Conference on the Situation in Venezuela
- Reactions to the 2014 Venezuelan protests
- Reactions to the 2017 Venezuelan protests
- International reactions to the 2024 Venezuelan presidential election
