= International Conference on the Situation in Venezuela =

Diplomatic conference

- Native name: Conferencia Internacional sobre la Situación en Venezuela
- Date: 7 February 2019
- Location: Montevideo, Uruguay
- Type: Diplomatic conference
- Cause: Venezuelan presidential crisis
- Organised by: Government of Mexico; Government of Uruguay
- Participants: Bolivia; Costa Rica; Ecuador; France; Germany; Italy; Mexico; Netherlands; Panama; Portugal; Spain; Sweden; United Kingdom; Uruguay

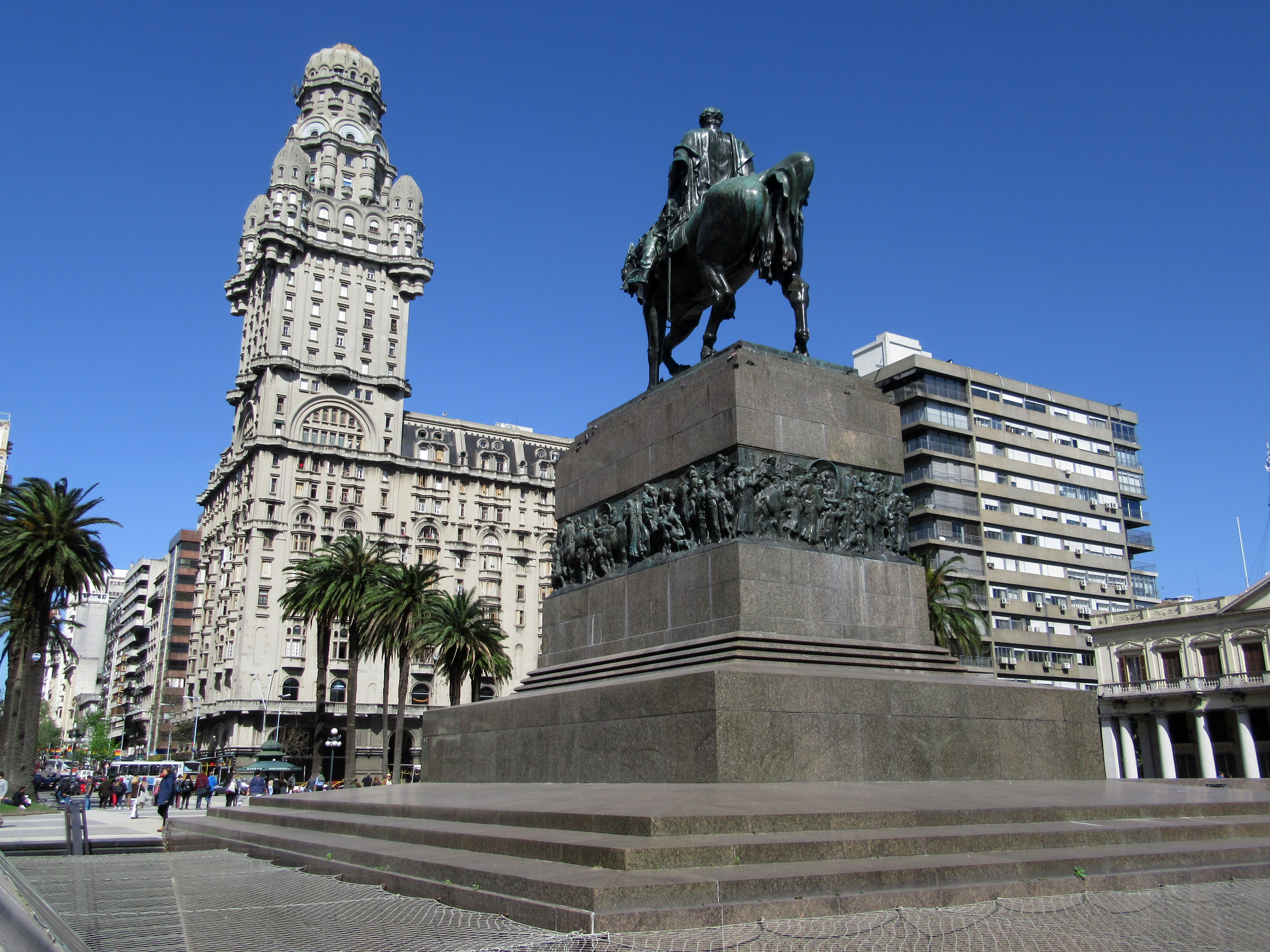
The International Conference on the Situation in Venezuela was held in Montevideo, Uruguay (pictured) on 7 February 2019

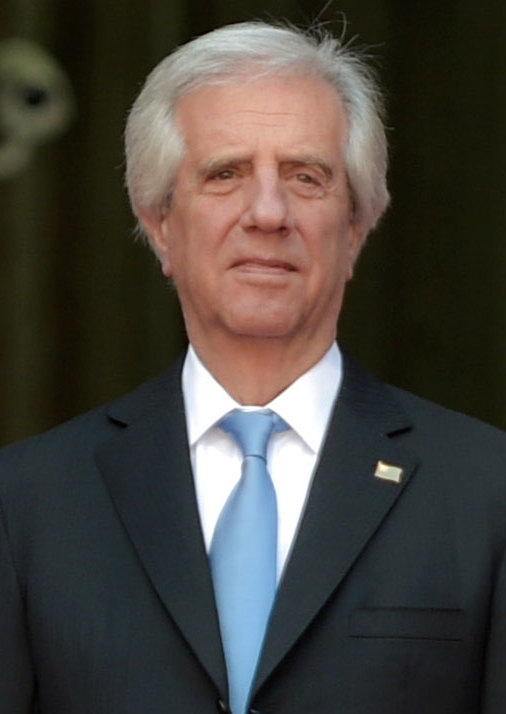
Uruguayan president Tabaré Vázquez (pictured) was a co-convener of the International Conference on the Situation in Venezuela

The International Conference on the Situation in Venezuela was a meeting of states which occurred in Montevideo, Uruguay, on 7 February 2019 to address the 2019 Venezuelan presidential crisis about the legitimacy of claims to the Venezuelan presidency by Juan Guaidó and Nicolás Maduro. The conference was jointly sponsored by the governments of Mexico and Uruguay; other participating countries included Bolivia, Costa Rica, Ecuador, France, Germany, Italy, the Netherlands, Panama, Portugal, Spain, Sweden, and the United Kingdom, forming the International Contact Group on Venezuela.

== Background ==
The International Conference on the Situation in Venezuela, jointly sponsored by the governments of Mexico and Uruguay, was announced on 30 January 2019. According to a statement issued by the Uruguayan foreign ministry, it was in response to the general call for dialog issued by United Nations Secretary-General António Guterres in relation to the 2019 Venezuelan presidential crisis. Mexico and Uruguay declined to support the position taken by other Mercosur and Lima Group states, which recognized Guaidó's claim to the acting presidency made by Venezuela's National Assembly. They instead called for a "new process of inclusive and credible negotiations with full respect for the rule of law and human rights".

According to the initial announcement by its sponsors, the conference was to be open to delegations from states that had taken a "neutral" position with respect to the situation in Venezuela. The conference has since been described as occurring for purposes of formation of a contact group.

The government of Mexico initially anticipated representatives from ten states to attend. According to France24, participating states – in addition to Mexico and Uruguay – would include France, the United Kingdom, Germany, Italy, the Netherlands, Portugal, Spain, Sweden, Bolivia, Costa Rica, and Ecuador.

Questioning why Uruguay has taken a position on Venezuela different than the majority of Latin American countries in the Lima Group, critics of Uruguayan president Tabaré Vázquez say he has a conflict in the Venezuelan matter, as his son, Javier Vázquez, is alleged to have made millions of dollars in Venezuelan deals with Chavismo, according to Jorge Castañeda Gutman, Mexico's Foreign Relations Secretary under President Vicente Fox. The Secretary of the Uruguayan Presidency issued a statement denouncing the allegations as "a cruel and unfounded operation", saying the business of the president's son had been investigated by authorities who found no evidence of a crime.

=== Reactions ===
According to the Venezuelan foreign ministry, Nicolás Maduro welcomed "this initiative and reiterates that dialogue is the only way to resolve disputes".

For his part, Guaidó thanked Uruguay for advancing the notion of free elections in Venezuela, but said that the National Assembly will not participate in dialogue with Maduro. His reasoning is that has already been done, "within and outside of Venezuela, in private and in public, alone and with international companions". He says the result in every instance has been more repression, with Maduro taking advantage of the process to strengthen the dictatorship. Offering as examples Leopoldo López, the detention of Juan Requesens, Julio Borges (in exile) and others, he says if Maduro really wanted dialogue, he would release political prisoners. In an appeal to Uruguay and Mexico, he asked those countries to join him, and said he refused to participate in negotiations whose aim is to maintain in power those who commit human rights violations. Guaidó characterizes Uruguay as failing to defend democracy, even as he says "[b]etween 2015 and 2017, the number of extrajudicial executions by the repressive machine was more than 9,200, more than three times the number of disappeared in Chile during the Pinochet military dictatorship." He said Uruguay's stance was surprising, considering Venezuela has 300,000 starving people at risk of dying.

President of Bolivia Evo Morales tweeted, "Bolivia praises and joins the initiative of brotherly countries Mexico and Uruguay".

Spokesperson for the Secretary-General of the United Nations Stephane Dujarric confirmed the UN was aware of the conference and was planning on organizing a meeting at United Nations Headquarters to discuss the proposal. In a subsequent announcement, United Nations representatives said they would not participate in the conference.

The day before the conference, on 6 February, the United States and 20 other nations convened a separate meeting in Ottawa, Canada, in which they issued a joint declaration reaffirming their recognition of Guaidó's claim to the acting Venezuelan presidency.

== Montevideo declaration ==
The conference was attended by ministerial-level representatives of all of the participating nations. Discussions were opened by President of Uruguay Tabaré Vázquez and the European Union's High Representative of the Union for Foreign Affairs and Security Policy Federica Mogherini.

At the end of the day, the participating states—with the exception of Bolivia and Mexico—agreed to form the International Contact Group on Venezuela and issued a jointly signed declaration which called for new elections to occur in Venezuela. The group called for elections within 90 days.

Bolivia objected to the Montevideo declaration due to their belief that Venezuelans must determine a way out of the crisis without outside involvement. According to Mexico's delegation, that country could not support the Montevideo declaration owing to a Mexican constitutional prohibition on interference in the domestic politics of foreign states.

=== Outcomes ===
A Russian-drafted UN Security Council calling for a dialogue between the Maduro government and the opposition based on the Montevideo mechanism of Mexico and Uruguay, was voted against by France, the United Kingdom, United States, Germany, Poland, Peru and Belgium while only 4 countries voted in favor of the resolution.

Beatriz Becerra—on the day after she retired as head of the human rights subcommittee for the European Parliament—said that the International Contact Group had been of no use and "has been an artifact that has served no purpose since it was created". She said there had been no progress on the 90-day deadline for elections that the group established when it was formed, and she considered that the Contact Group should be terminated and efforts coordinated through the Lima Group.

== International Contact Group ==
The International Contact Group on Venezuela recognized Juan Guaidó as President of the National Assembly after the 2020 Venezuelan National Assembly Delegated Committee election, describing the election of his rival Luis Parra as illegitimate.

== See also ==
- Reactions to the 2014 Venezuelan protests
- Reactions to the 2017 Venezuelan protests
- Responses to the Venezuelan presidential crisis
