= International Business Initiatives =

International Business Initiatives Corp
- Company type: Privately held company
- Industry: Consulting
- Founded: 1996; 29 years ago
- Founder: Lucie Phillipa
- Headquarters: Arlington, Virginia, United States
- Area served: Worldwide
- Key people: Lucie Phillips (Chair), Maggie Burke (COO)
- Services: International development consultancy
- Owner: Woman owned
- Number of employees: 150 (2024)
- Website: www.ibi-usa.com

International Business Initiatives (IBI) is an American economic development and public financial management consulting firm based in Arlington, Virginia. It has completed projects throughout the developing world. Its main client is the United States Agency for International Development (USAID).

It is best known for its implementation of the Governance and Economic Management Assistance Program (GEMAP) in Liberia from 2005-2010, its implementation of a follow-on project called the Governance and Economic Management Support (GEMS) project, and its recognition as USAID’s 2015 Small Business of the Year. It uses performance improvement methodologies to design and implement Information and Communications Technology solutions adapted to local conditions.

== History ==
IBI was founded in 1996 by Dr. Lucie Phillipa, an Africa expert and former associate professor at the University of Maryland Baltimore County and Professional Lecturer at Johns Hopkins School of Advanced International Studies.

IBI provides public financial management expertise to optimize revenue, trade, and economic growth throughout Liberia, Bangladesh, Ukraine, and other countries. IBI is a designated woman-owned small business, board member of the International Consortium on Governmental Financial Management (ICGFM) and member of the International Society for Performance Improvement (ISPI).

In 2016, IBI was ranked in the number three spot in Devex’s list of top women-owned USAID contractors.

== Governance and Economic Management Assistance Program (GEMAP) ==
Between 2005-2010, IBI was a USAID implementer of the Governance and Economic Management Assistance Program (GEMAP) in Liberia. GEMAP was an effort, started September 2005, by the Liberian government and the international community, via the International Contact Group on Liberia (ICGL) to reshape the fundamentally broken system of governance that contributed to 23 years of conflict in Liberia. The program was designed and funded by the International Monetary Fund, World Bank, the U.S. Treasury Department and USAID.

United States Government-funded GEMAP activities were implemented by IBI, Segura, and TRAWOCO. It involved embedding non-Liberian financial controllers within Liberian institutions. These “advisors” had co-signatory authority over major financial transactions.
