= Ibi =

Ibi or IBI may refer to:

== Companies ==
- IBI Group, a Canadian-based architecture, engineering, planning, and technology firm
- Information Builders Incorporated, American software firm

== Places ==
- Ibi, Nigeria, a town and administrative district in Taraba State, central Nigeria
- Ibi, Spain, a town in the province of Alicante, Spain
- Ibi District, Gifu in Japan
- Ibi River, a river in Japan
- Ibi, Burkina Faso

== People ==
- Qakare Ibi, an ancient Egyptian ruler
- Ibi (Egyptian Noble)
- Sinibaldo Ibi, an Italian painter
- Ibi Kaslik, a Hungarian-Canadian novelist and journalist
- Ibrahim Afellay, a Dutch-Moroccan football player nicknamed 'Ibi'

== Other ==
- Ibi people, a Timucuan-speaking people that lived in what is now the U.S. state of Georgia
- I.B.I (band), a South Korean girl group.

== Acronyms ==
- Imperial Bank of India, now the State Bank of India since 1955
- Index of biological integrity, in biology or ecology, an indicator of the health of a watershed.
- Information Based Indicia, an electronic postage system used by the United States Postal Service
- Information Builders Inc., makers of FOCUS WebFocus and Iway Software
- Inquiry-based instruction, teaching method posing questions, problems or scenarios, rather than simply presenting established facts or portraying a smooth path to knowledge
- Interbeat interval
- International Boat Industry, UK based business marine magazine
- International Bowling Industry, a ten-pin bowling magazine
- International Business Initiatives, an economic development firm in Arlington, Virginia.
- Irish Bible Institute, an evangelical bible college in Dublin, Ireland

== See also ==
- Ibis (disambiguation)
