= Iby =

Iby or IBY may refer to:

- Qakare Ibi (reigned c. 2170 BCE), ancient Egyptian pharaoh
- Ibi (Egyptian Noble) (fl. 7th century BCE)
- Friedl Iby (1905 – 1960), German gymnast
- Paul Iby (born 1935), Austrian bishop

== See also ==
- Ibi (disambiguation)
