= Reactions to the 2017 Venezuelan protests =

Reaction to protests in Venezuela in 2017

Reactions to the 2017 Venezuelan protests have been declared by numerous domestic and international organizations, responding to events occurring throughout the years of protests. The reactions are listed below.

== Reactions ==
=== Supranational bodies ===
- United Nations – The Office of the United Nations High Commissioner For Human Rights (OHCHR) spokesperson, Elizabeth Throssell, stated, "We are concerned at reports of violence. We call on the Venezuelan government to ensure that the rights to freedom of peaceful assembly and freedom of opinion are guaranteed", called on Venezuelans "to use peaceful means to make themselves heard" and criticized the Venezuelan government's 15-year ban from politics of opposition leader Henrique Capriles Radonski, saying "(Capriles) is a democratically elected politician and has held public posts over a political career spanning more than 20 years".
  - The OHCHR released a statement on 8 August 2017 saying that there is "widespread and systematic use of excessive force and arbitrary detentions against demonstrators in Venezuela", that there are "patterns of other human rights violations, including violent house raids, torture and ill-treatment of those detained in connection with the protests", with more than half of deaths related to protests being related to Venezuelan authorities and pro-government colectivos.
- European Union – Federica Mogherini, the High Representative of the Union for Foreign Affairs and Security Policy, criticized the Venezuelan government's handling of protests, stating "violence and use of force will not resolve the current crisis", that it is the right of Venezuelans "to see the political conflict immediately solved" and denouncing the 15-year ban from politics of Capriles, saying that the ban "does not help to lower the unrest and the tensions in the country".

- The European Parliament adopted a resolution with 450 votes compared to 35 and 100 abstentions, the parliament released a statement saying that it "strongly condemns the 'brutal repression' exercised by the Venezuelan security forces, as well as irregular armed groups, against the peaceful protests" and "denounce the continuing unconstitutional violation of the democratic order in Venezuela and the lack of separation of powers and independence of the branches of government", objecting "to the Supreme Court's recent decision to suspend the powers of the National Assembly". MEPs called for mediation actions that included the release of political prisoners and the approval of international humanitarian aid.

- Organization of American States – Secretary General Luis Almagro stated "I can not help but admire the courage of the people in the street. When no one has solved this humanitarian and political crisis, neither by means of mediation nor by rigged dialogues, the people have decided to make their voices heard in the whole continent, as mandated by the Bolivarian Constitution in its Article 350".

=== Governments ===
- Belgium – Belgian Foreign Minister Didier Reynders stated that he was "very concerned" about the expansion of the Bolivarian Militia and said that "the establishment of a precise electoral calendar, as provided by the Constitution, as well as respect for the National Assembly and its members, would contribute to the restoration of political stability".
- Colombia – President Juan Manuel Santos shared comments on social media, stating that "I warned Chávez 6 years ago that the Bolivarian revolution failed" and that there was "serious concern" over President Maduro's plans to expand the National Militia.

- President of the Congress of Colombia, Mauricio Lizano, stated "We are very concerned because democracy in that country is over", and said that congress stood in solidarity with the opposition-led National Assembly of Venezuela.

- Germany – The German Foreign Ministry regretted the three deaths during the day's protests, condemned violence and stated that President Maduro must release political prisoners, recognize the National Assembly and establish an electoral calendar, saying that these moves "will set the conditions for resuming the national dialogue".
- Mexico – The Mexican foreign ministry stated that "Mexico calls on all parties to refrain from resorting to violence or provocation and resolve their differences through peaceful means", following violent clashes during demonstration after the Venezuelan government banned Capriles from participating in political offices for 15 years.
- Peru – President Pedro Pablo Kuczynski stated, "We do not want to interfere in the situation of another brother country, but there must be no political prisoners or deaths in the demonstrations ... we will help you if you need it. We are all here with you".
- St. Lucia – Minister with Responsibility for External Affairs Sarah Flood-Beaubrun stated, "Our borders are open and so what happens in one country affects the other" and "that even with countries are friendly with us, we have got to be true to our friends and we have got to always try to lead by example and be frank ... When lives are lost, when there are issues regarding democratic processes, when people are suffering – we need to find solutions".

=== Others ===
- The "No Más" movement was created which called on Venezuela's diaspora to join protests occurring worldwide in Argentina, Canada, Chile, Colombia, Germany, Mexico, Panama, Peru, Spain, United Kingdom and the United States.
- Venezuelan conductor Gustavo Dudamel condemned Maduro's response to the protests for the first time on 4 May, the day after the killing of Armando Cañizales, writing in social media: "I raise my voice against violence and repression. Nothing can justify bloodshed. Enough of ignoring the just clamor of a people suffocated by an intolerable crisis."

== See also ==
- Reactions to the 2014 Venezuelan protests
- Responses to the Venezuelan presidential crisis
- International Conference on the Situation in Venezuela
