= International Contact Group on the Mano River Basin =

The International Contact Group on the Mano River Basin (ICG-MRB) is an ad-hoc formed International Contact Group created to liaise in the situation in Liberia.

It is the successor to the International Contact Group on Liberia, with an expanded remit to deal with the entire Mano River basin region.

== See also ==
- Mano River Union
