= International reactions to the 2024 Venezuelan presidential election =

Map showing the recognition of Maduro as the winner of the 2024 Venezuelan presidential election: Venezuela Recognise Do not recognise Not stated

International reactions to the 2024 Venezuelan presidential election of Incumbent President Nicolás Maduro on 28 July 2024 emerged from around the world, including from states and international institutions.

Polls conducted before the election indicated that Edmundo González would win by a wide margin. After the government-controlled National Electoral Council (CNE) announced summary numbers, without detailed results, representing a narrow Maduro victory on 29 July, several Latin American and Western countries such as the United States and the European Union, and the opposition, expressed skepticism of the numbers or did not recognize the CNE claims; while others, including Russia, China, Iran, Cuba and Bolivia, (Note: Bolivia changed its position on the election following the inauguration of President Rodrigo Paz on 8 November 2025, recognizing González as the president-elect of Venezuela.) congratulated Maduro. Academics, news outlets and the opposition found strong evidence, including the detailed results of the election from the tally sheets collected by poll watchers, showing that González won the election by a wide margin.

Both González and Maduro proclaimed themselves winners of the election. According to Spain's EFE, "Chavismo claim[ed] that more than 60 nations [had] 'welcomed Maduro's victory'."

== States ==
=== Africa ===
==== Algeria ====
Algeria congratulated Maduro.

==== Angola ====
Angola congratulated Maduro.

==== Burkina Faso ====
Burkina Faso congratulated Maduro.

==== Republic of the Congo ====
Republic of the Congo congratulated Maduro.

==== Djibouti ====
President of Djibouti Ismaïl Omar Guelleh congratulated Maduro.

==== Egypt ====
President of Egypt Abdel Fattah el-Sisi congratulated Maduro.

==== Equatorial Guinea ====
President of Equatorial Guinea Teodoro Obiang Nguema Mbasogo congratulated Maduro.

==== Eritrea ====
Eritrea recognized the results of the election and congratulated Maduro.

==== Gabon ====
Gabon congratulated Maduro.

==== Guinea-Bissau ====
President of Guinea-Bissau Umaro Sissoco Embaló congratulated Maduro and expressed wishes for his new term to be represented by peace and progress.

==== Madagascar ====
President of Madagascar Andry Rajoelina released a public statement expressing that Madagascar "salutes" Venezuela's successful show of its sovereignty and democracy, and congratulated Maduro on his re-election.

==== Mali ====
Interim President of Mali Assimi Goïta congratulated Maduro.

==== Morocco ====
Morocco reiterated its support for the Venezuelan opposition and condemned the repression of protestors by Maduro.

==== Mozambique ====
President of Mozambique Filipe Nyusi congratulated Maduro.

==== Namibia ====
President of Namibia Nangolo Mbumba expressed his "revolutionary congratulated" on Maduro's re-election and called the results "a clear demonstration of their trust and confidence in [his] leadership."

==== Sahrawi Arab Democratic Republic ====
President Brahim Ghali of the partially recognized state Sahrawi Arab Democratic Republic congratulated Maduro on his re-election, expressing a commitment to strengthen bilateral relations and praising Venezuela's democratic process.

==== São Tomé and Príncipe ====
Prime Minister of São Tomé and Príncipe Patrice Trovoada congratulated Maduro.

==== Sudan ====
President of Sudan Abdel Fattah al-Burhan congratulated Maduro.

==== Zimbabwe ====
President of Zimbabwe Emmerson Mnangagwa congratulated Maduro.

=== Asia ===
==== Abkhazia ====
Aslan Bzhania, President of Abkhazia (a partially recognised state), (Note: The political status of Abkhazia is disputed. Having unilaterally declared independence from Georgia in 1992, Abkhazia is formally recognised as an independent state by 4 UN member states (three other states previously recognised it but then withdrew their recognition), while the remainder of the international community recognizes it as de jure Georgian territory. Georgia continues to claim the area as its own territory, designating it as Russian-occupied territory.) congratulated Maduro, calling the election "a confirmation of the people's high trust and support for [his] policies."

==== Azerbaijan ====
Azerbaijani President Ilham Aliyev congratulated Maduro on his re-election and expressed hopes of continued strengthening of Azerbaijan-Venezuela bilateral relations.

==== Cambodia ====
Maduro's Foreign Minister, Yván Gil, extended his thanks to the peoples of the world, specifically to Cambodia for their recognition and congratulations, on the occasion of Maduro's re-election. "On behalf of President Nicolás Maduro, we thank the Prime Minister of Cambodia, Hun Manet, for his greetings on the electoral victory and his wishes for prosperity," he said.

==== China ====
The Chinese Foreign Ministry congratulated Venezuela's ability to conduct its presidential election peacefully and without issues, and asserted China's commitment to maintaining close ties to Venezuela.

==== Iran ====
Iranian Foreign Ministry spokesman Nasser Kanaani congratulated the government and people of Venezuela, calling the presidential election "successful."

==== Israel ====
Israeli Foreign Minister Gideon Sa'ar recognized opposition figure Edmundo González as Venezuela's president-elect.

==== Japan ====
Japan labelled the election as "opaque" and called for "free and fair elections" in Venezuela, further adding that it closely monitors the situation.

==== Kuwait ====
The Emir of Kuwait Mishal Al-Ahmad Al-Jaber Al-Sabah congratulated Maduro.

==== Laos ====
Yván Gil tweeted that President of Laos Thongloun Sisoulith congratulated Maduro.

==== Myanmar ====
Myanmar recognized the results of the election and congratulated Maduro.

==== Pakistan ====
The President of Pakistan Asif Ali Zardari acknowledged Maduro as the winner.

==== Palestine ====
The State of Palestine recognized the results of the election and congratulated Maduro.

==== Qatar ====
Qatar's Sheikh Tamim bin Hamad Al Thani congratulated Maduro and "looked forward to strengthening bilateral relations". The Shura Council of Qatar also participated in monitoring the elections.

==== South Ossetia ====
Alan Gagloev, president of partially recognised South Ossetia, congratulated Maduro calling "the results of the presidential elections once again confirmed [Maduro's] high authority and leading role in the implementation of government policies that reflect the will of the people of Venezuela."

==== Ba'athist Syria ====
Syrian President Bashar al-Assad congratulated Maduro and the Venezuelan population's "adherence to the sovereignty of their country and constitution" in addition to their "free and independent will away from any attempts to interfere in their internal affairs." He expressed the need for nations like Venezuela and Syria to maintain close relations to maintain their autonomy.

Following the fall of the Assad regime later in 2024, the Syrian transitional government has not expressed any position regarding the election results.

==== Turkey ====
Turkey is the only NATO country that has warm relations with Venezuela. The Turkish Foreign Ministry made a statement that it was pleased with the presidential elections in Venezuela and the way it was conducted in an atmosphere of peace and tranquility. President Erdoğan called Maduro and expressed gratitude for Venezuela's support for Palestine.

==== Uzbekistan ====
President of Uzbekistan Shavkat Mirziyoyev congratulated Maduro.

==== Vietnam ====
President of Vietnam Tô Lâm congratulated Maduro.

=== Europe ===
==== Belarus ====
Belarusian President Alexander Lukashenko congratulated Maduro "on behalf of the Belarusian people" and expressed faith in his ability to maintain Venezuela's sovereignty.

==== Germany ====
The Foreign Ministry of Germany released a public statement on X (Twitter) calling for access to all election and voting records and for the public release of every polling stations' results in detail.

==== Holy See ====
Pope Francis called for "dialogue and truth," as well as avoiding any type of violence.

==== Hungary ====
Foreign Ministry spokesperson Máté Paczolay expressed Hungary's support for Corina Machado and González Urrutia, saying that Maduro attempts to "cling to power."

==== Italy ====
Deputy Prime Minister of Italy Antonio Tajani stated that the Italian government was "perplexed" by the reported election results, expressing apprehension about Maduro's claim to victory reflecting "the will of the people." On 20 November, during a visit in Argentina, prime minister Giorgia Meloni recognized Edmundo Gonzalez as the president-elect of Venezuela.

==== Norway ====
Deputy Foreign Minister of Norway Andreas Motzfeldt Kravik expressed the need for "full transparency" of election results to ensure the validity of the elections.

==== Portugal ====
The Ministry of Foreign Affairs said in a public statement made on X (Twitter) that "only transparency will guarantee legitimacy" for Venezuela.

==== Russia ====
President of Russia Vladimir Putin congratulated Maduro and expressed that Russia has a "strategic partnership" with Venezuela, and asserted confidence that its relationship with Maduro would contribute to mutual development.

Russian Ambassador to Venezuela Sergey Melik-Bagdasarov called the results "trustworthy", and congratulated Maduro's election victory as a representation of "Venezuela's position in the emerging multipolar world".

==== Spain ====
The Spanish government stated that Venezuela needed "total transparency" towards the voting results. Spanish Minister of Foreign Affairs, European Union and Cooperation José Manuel Albares requested that Maduro to release comprehensive and accurate data about the election results.

Second Deputy Prime Minister of Spain Yolanda Díaz called for a recognition of the results but agreed with the call for more transparency.

==== Serbia ====
President of Serbia Aleksandar Vučić congratulated Maduro on the election results and thanked Venezuela for withholding recognition of Kosovo.

==== Ukraine ====
Ukraine called for a "transparent" recount of the votes and condemned the use of force against protesters.

==== United Kingdom ====
The British Foreign Office alleged that there were "serious irregularities" in the voting results and requested that Venezuela's Electoral Council release accurate and detailed vote count results to determine that the election results matched the Venezuelan peoples' vote.

=== North America ===
==== Antigua and Barbuda ====
Prime Minister Gaston Browne released a public letter that congratulated Maduro on his election victory, and vowed to resist against attempts by other nations to interfere with Venezuela's internal affairs.

==== Canada ====
Canada's Deputy Prime Minister Chrystia Freeland expressed that Canada had "serious concerns" about the proclaimed election results. Freeland emphasized Canada's long-standing support for Venezuela's democratic opposition and condemned the increasingly authoritarian nature of the regime.

Minister of Foreign Affairs Mélanie Joly made a public statement calling for Venezuelan election authorities to release detailed results from each polling station.

In January 2025, Canada formally recognized González as president-elect. The minister of Foreign Affairs declared: "Maduro's shameless actions demonstrate that democracy and the rule of law cannot be taken for granted. We will not tolerate the erosion of the democratic process or the repression of citizens seeking to express their rights."

==== Cuba ====
President of Cuba Miguel Díaz-Canel celebrated the election and its results as a representation of the Venezuelan people's "dignity and courage" against "pressure and manipulation". He congratulated Maduro and referred to him as a "brother", celebrating the continued progress of the "Bolivarian and Chavista Revolution".

==== Dominica ====
Prime Minister of Dominica Roosevelt Skerrit congratulated Maduro and stated that he thinks "democracy will continue to reign" and hopes "that we can all respect the results and continue to work with Venezuela and its people".

==== Haiti ====
Haiti at the OAS voted in favor of demanding the Maduro government to release all electoral data.

==== Jamaica ====
Jamaica voted at the OAS in favor of demanding the Venezuelan government the immediate release of all electoral data.

==== Saint Vincent and the Grenadines ====
The Ministry of Foreign Affairs and Foreign Trade of Saint Vincent and the Grenadines congratulated Maduro and stated they "remain confident that he will continue the just cause of the Bolivarian Revolution.

==== United States ====
United States Secretary of State Antony Blinken stated that the U.S. government has "serious concerns" that the Venezuelan election results did not reflect "the will nor the votes of the Venezuelan people". He demanded that Venezuelan electoral authorities immediately publish fair, and transparent election results as well as comprehensive tabulation of votes for independent and opposition analyzers to evaluate. He asserted that the United States and the international community were monitoring the situation "very closely" and that they would "respond accordingly".

Blinken expressed doubts about the veracity of the results from the CNE, and indicated that the US awaited reports of international observers. Biden administration officials, speaking anonymously to Reuters, said that Maduro's reported victory lacked credibility and that Venezuelan sanctions would be re-assessed; Brazilian sources said a 30 July call with Brazil's President Lula was "scheduled at the request of the U.S. government as it seeks Brazil's assessment of the election results in neighboring Venezuela".

On 1 August, Blinken said: "Given the overwhelming evidence, it is clear to the United States and, most importantly, to the Venezuelan people that Edmundo González Urrutia won the most votes in Venezuela's July 28 presidential election ... We congratulate Edmundo González Urrutia on his successful campaign. Now is the time for the Venezuelan parties to begin discussions on a respectful, peaceful transition in accordance with Venezuelan electoral law and the wishes of the Venezuelan people." The Washington Post, The Wall Street Journal, and Reuters wrote that Blinken did not recognize González as president-elect; the Associated Press and The Guardian wrote that he did. The following year, in January 2025, Blinken more explicitly stated that "González Urrutia should be sworn in."

On 3 January 2026, the United States conducted airstrikes on multiple locations in northern Venezuela and captured Maduro, deposing him as president. U.S. Attorney General Pam Bondi announced that Maduro and his wife, Cilia Flores, had been indicted in the Southern District of New York on charges related to narcoterrorism, and will face trial in the United States.

=== Mexico, Central and South America ===
The electoral results released by the government-controlled Venezuelan National Electoral Council (CNE) and the declaration of Maduro as the winner was quickly followed by a mixture of scepticism and criticism from the leaders of most Latin American countries. Some Latin American countries, however, recognized and congratulated Maduro as the election winner, including Bolivia, Cuba, Honduras and Nicaragua, Condemnation from some countries, including Costa Rica, El Salvador, Peru and Uruguay, was far more direct, describing the CNE result in terms of fraud or corruption.

==== Argentina ====
Harsh criticism came from President Javier Milei of Argentina, telling Maduro to "get out" and calling him a "dictator", adding that "Venezuelans chose to put an end to [Maduro's] communist dictatorship. The [exit poll] data shows a crushing opposition victory and the world is waiting for the defeat of years of socialism, misery, decadence and death to be recognised." Maduro responded by calling Milei a "sociopath".

On 2 August, Foreign Minister Diana Mondino recognized González as president-elect, but the Foreign Ministry later said that the official decision of Argentina regarding the election had not yet been taken.

On 7 August, Argentina formally recognized González as the "undisputed winner" of the Venezuelan election.

==== Brazil ====
President of Brazil Luiz Inácio Lula da Silva announced that he would not recognize the re-election of Nicolás Maduro in Venezuela until the United Nations (UN) and the Carter Center carry out investigations into the allegations made by the Venezuelan opposition. The Brazilian government added that "[Brazil] is closely monitoring the counting process and [Brazil] awaits the publication by the national electoral council (CNE) of data broken down by polling stations, an essential step towards transparency, credibility and legitimacy".

The Brazilian Ministry of Foreign Affairs said detailed tallies were "essential for the transparency, credibility and legitimacy" of the results and praised the "peaceful nature" of the election. Lula called the controversy a "normal" process and urged for the dispute to be settled through legal means, but asked for the release of the total vote tally.

==== Bolivia ====
President of Bolivia Luis Arce congratulated Nicolás Maduro on his electoral victory, stating that "We want to ratify our will to continue strengthening our ties of friendship, cooperation and solidarity with the Bolivarian Republic of Venezuela." However, on 2 August, Bolivian ambassador to Venezuela Sebastián Michel told Bolivian media RTP on a televised interview that the results presented by the PUD are official citing the minutes in the counting process.

Bolivia would then change its position on the elections recognizing González as the president-elect of Venezuela, following the inauguration of President Rodrigo Paz on 8 November 2025 and the arrest of Luis Arce on 10 December 2025.

==== Chile ====
President Gabriel Boric of Chile was the first foreign leader to question the CNE result by saying "Maduro's regime must understand that the results are difficult to believe". "The international community, especially the Venezuelan people including those in exile, demand total transparency" while making it clear that "Chile will not recognize any result that is not verifiable".

==== Colombia ====
Colombian Foreign Minister Luis Gilberto Murillo called for a "total vote count and audit" of the Venezuelan elections, stating that, "The results must be fully credible."

The Colombian government highlighted "the importance of clearing any doubts about the results" also adding the "[Colombia] calls for the total vote count, its verification and independent audit to be carried out as soon as possible."

==== Costa Rica ====
A public statement made from the government of Rodrigo Chaves Robles stated that it did not recognize Maduro's election, repudiating it and calling it "fraudulent." It added that it will work together with the "democratic governments" of the continent as well as international organizations to ensure that the "will of the Venezuelan people" was respected.

On 2 August, Costa Rica recognized González as the president-elect.

==== Ecuador ====
President Daniel Noboa of Ecuador warned that "throughout the region, politicians are trying to "cling to power" and trying to take peace away from our citizens. That is what we face, that is the danger of dictatorship, and today we are witnessing how one more of them tries to take hope away from millions of Venezuelans."

The Ecuadorian Foreign Ministry indicated, through its X (Twitter) account, that it rejects the "lack of transparency in the Venezuelan elections", adding that: "the absence of guarantees in the process... delegitimizes and vitiates the results of the elections", also calling on the International Community to monitor and verify the transfer of the elections. President Daniel Noboa reposted the message on his account, adding that: "there are politicians who try to cling to power, that is the danger of the dictatorship" and requested that the Foreign Ministry take steps to convene the Permanent Council of the OAS and address the situation in Venezuela.

On 2 August, Ecuador recognized González as the president-elect.

==== El Salvador ====
President Nayib Bukele called the official electoral result released by the National Electoral Council of Venezuela a fraud and said, "What we saw yesterday in Venezuela has no other name than fraud. An 'election' where the official result has no relation to reality. Something obvious to anyone."

==== Guatemala ====
President Bernardo Arévalo questioned the results of Maduro's proclaimed victory, publicly stating that "Venezuela deserves transparent, accurate results that adhere to the will of its people."

On 5 August, President Arévalo said that Guatemala does not recognize Maduro, rejected the results of the CNE, but stopped short of recognizing González.

==== Guyana ====
Guyana called for a "transparent verification process" of the election in Venezuela.

==== Honduras ====
President Xiomara Castro released a statement saying "Our special congratulations and Democratic, Socialist and Revolutionary greetings to President Nicolas Maduro and the brave people of Venezuela for their unobjectionable triumph, which reaffirms their sovereignty and the historical legacy of Commander Hugo Chavez."

==== Mexico ====
In Mexico, the Secretariat of Foreign Affairs released a statement calling for a transparent review including the electoral agency's minutes and full reports. In contrast, President Andrés Manuel López Obrador said that he would wait until the vote count is complete and that "if the electoral authority confirms this trend, we will recognize the government elected by the people of Venezuela".

==== Nicaragua ====
Vice President Rosario Murillo congratulated Nicolás Maduro, saying that "The Venezuelan people are moving forward to light, life and truth." Later, President Daniel Ortega denounced an alleged "coup d'état" in reference to questions about the results provided by the CNE.

==== Panama ====
The President of the Republic of Panama, José Raúl Mulino, expressed his rejection of the results and announced the withdrawal of Panama's diplomats to Venezuela, suspending diplomatic relations.

Mulino stated on 6 August his desire to "host a summit of 17 Latin American presidents to discuss the political situation in Venezuela and support democracy in the country". He had asked his foreign minister to organize it and had asked the United States for support.

==== Paraguay ====
President of Paraguay Santiago Peña advocated for the verification of the precise details of the election.

==== Peru ====
Peru recalled its ambassador from Venezuela and expelled the Venezuelan diplomats from Peru.

Peruvian Foreign Minister Javier González Olaechea indicated through his X (Twitter) account that he "condemns the irregularities with the intention of defrauding the Venezuelan government" and that "Peru will not accept the violation of the popular will of the Venezuelan people." Gonzáles called his ambassador for consultation on responding to the results.

The BBC and The Guardian reported that Peru was the first country to recognize González as Venezuela's president-elect, on 30 July—a statement from the former Peruvian foreign minister that was corrected on 5 September by Peru's Council of Ministers after a new foreign minister was named. Peruvian President Dina Boluarte reinforced on 6 September that Peru's position with respect to Venezuela had not changed under the new foreign minister, saying "We will not be part of an electoral fraud; we will not support a dictatorial government."

==== Suriname ====
Suriname voted in favor of demanding the Venezuelan government the publication of all electoral records.

==== Uruguay ====
President Luis Lacalle Pou spoke out against the results of the Venezuelan general elections. He made a public statement on his X (Twitter) account expressing, "Not like that! It was an open secret. They were going to 'win' regardless of the real results. The process up to the day of the election and the counting of votes was clearly flawed. You cannot recognize a victory if you do not trust the way and the mechanisms used to achieve it".

On 2 August, Uruguay recognized González as the president-elect with the foreign minister stating that "based on overwhelming evidence, it is clear to Uruguay that Edmundo González Urrutia won the majority of votes".

=== Oceania ===
==== Australia ====
The Australian Government noted that the Venezuelan Presidential election took place on 28 July 2024. In its official statement, the Government emphasized that the results of Venezuela's Presidential election must accurately reflect the democratic vote and the will of the people. It called on Venezuelan authorities to publish detailed results from all polling stations to ensure transparency and accountability.

The Australian Government strongly urged a peaceful return to democracy in Venezuela through free and fair Presidential elections. It also called upon Venezuelan authorities to guarantee full respect for freedom of assembly and expression.

== International organizations ==
=== African Petroleum Producers' Organization ===
The African Petroleum Producers' Organization congratulated Maduro for his "unflinching support and faith that the people of Venezuela have in him."

=== ALBA–TCP ===
ALBA–TCP congratulated Maduro, calling it a "demonstration of the strength of the Venezuelan participatory and active democracy, whose people, besieged by imperialist powers, have expressed their will in a civic and deeply patriotic manner in a historic election for the peace and stability of the region and the entire world."

=== Gas Exporting Countries Forum ===
Secretary General of the Gas Exporting Countries Forum Mohammad Hamel congratulated Maduro and "express [his] deep gratitude for the contributions of the esteemed representatives of Venezuela".

=== Group of Seven ===
The Group of Seven called for the publication of "detailed election results in full transparency" and asked "to immediately share all information with the opposition and independent observers".

=== European Union ===
The high representative of the EU Union for Foreign Affairs, Josep Borrell, asked for "the detailed counting of votes and access to the voting records" in Venezuela, asserting that "The will must be respected." He said the EU would not recognize the election until those conditions are met.

It was reported that Hungary vetoed a unified statement, a spokesman of the Hungarian Ministry of Foreign Affairs later denied such veto.

The European Parliament recognised Venezuelan opposition leader González as the legitimate and democratically elected president of the country with a non-binding resolution.

=== Organization of American States ===
The day after the election, nine Latin American countries (Argentina, Costa Rica, the Dominican Republic, Ecuador, Guatemala, Panama, Paraguay, Peru, and Uruguay) published a joint communication via the Foreign Ministry of Argentina. Together, these countries requested that the Organization of American States (OAS) organize an emergency meeting, with the joint communication expressing "profound concern" over the proclaimed election results and demanding "a comprehensive review of the results in the presence of independent electoral observers in order to guarantee respect for the will of the Venezuelan people who took part in the election peacefully and in large numbers."

A 31 July resolution that demanded the publication of the voting protocols failed by only reaching 17 votes of the 18 needed. Argentina, Canada, Chile, Costa Rica, the Dominican Republic, Ecuador, El Salvador, Guatemala, Guyana, Haiti, Jamaica, Panama, Paraguay, Peru, Suriname, Uruguay and the US voted in favour; Antigua and Barbuda, Bahamas, Barbados, Belize, Bolivia, Brazil, Colombia, Grenada, Honduras, Saint Kitts and Nevis and Saint Lucia abstained and Dominica, Mexico, Saint Vincent and the Grenadines, Trinidad and Tobago and Venezuela were absent.

The Permanent Council of the OAS met on 16 August and presented a draft resolution that was approved by consensus calling for the vote tallies to be protected and published, respect for the sovereignty of the election results, and emphasizing the rights to basic freedoms without reprisals and arbitrary arrests, while acknowledging the peaceful effort of Venezuelans in the 28 July election. The resolution urged the Venezuelan election authorities to abide by the agreements signed in Mexico and Barbados, and to end the state violence perpetrated by the regime. It was approved after a majority of OAS member states voted yes including member states those who voted no or abstained in the previous session such as Antigua and Barbuda, Brazil, Colombia, Dominica, Saint Kitts and Nevis, and Saint Lucia. The resolution was jointly signed with European Union declaration.

== Political parties ==
=== Europe ===
- Portugal: The Portuguese Communist Party praised the victory of the "progressive, democratic and patriotic Venezuelan forces" and criticized the reaction of the Portuguese government.
- Spain: Popular Unity Candidacy, Podemos, United Left, Galician Nationalist Bloc and EH Bildu in their respective statements congratulated Maduro and called to recognize the "will of the Venezuelan people".

=== North America ===
- Canada: Conservative Party of Canada leader Pierre Poilievre called on Prime Minister of Canada Justin Trudeau and Canadian Minister of Foreign Affairs Mélanie Joly to withhold acknowledgment of Maduro's re-election, citing reports of "serious electoral irregularities" in vote counting as evidence of the regime's refusal to accept "the will of the people". He urged for the release of a full record of votes and polling stations voting records before any recognition of the results. He emphasized the importance of Canada supporting Venezuelans in their pursuit of freedom and genuine democracy.

=== Latin America ===
- Argentina: The Renewal Front of former economy minister and 2023 presidential candidate Sergio Massa called on to Maduro's government to release the full results, and called Maduro's victory proclamation "irregular" and "lacking evidence." The statement also condemned the Venezuelan state forces' use of violence against protestors.
- Brazil: The Workers' Party called the electoral process "peaceful, democratic and sovereign".
- El Salvador: The Farabundo Martí National Liberation Front congratulated Maduro and claimed that "the Venezuelan people have said no to fascism, no to the blockade, no to violence and no to imperialist intervention."
- Uruguay: The ruling National Party expressed "its absolute rejection and opposition to the dictatorial process" led by Nicolás Maduro and criticized the fact that there were banned candidates and deported international observers in the election. The Honorable Board, the party's central body, expressed its solidarity with all the Venezuelan people and recognized Edmundo González Urrutia as president-elect of Venezuela.

== See also ==
- Responses to the Venezuelan presidential crisis (2019)
