= International Contact Group =

International Contact Groups are "informal, non-permanent international bodies that are created ad hoc, with the purpose of coordinating international actors in their aim of managing a peace and security crisis in a specific state or region (single-issue). They are founded and formed out of by states and/or international organizations/regional organizations. They do not have own administrative structures, but are official announced and meet periodically." Since 1977, at least 27 ICGs have been formed.

Examples of such groups include:

- OSCE Minsk Group
- Western Contact Group, Namibia (1977)
- Contact Group (Balkans) (1994)
- International Contact Group (Basque politics)
- International Contact Group on Liberia (1996)
- International Contact Group for Libya (2015)
- International Contact Group on the Mano River Basin (2002)
- Contact Group on Piracy off the Coast of Somalia (since 2008)
- Friends of Syria Group, an International Contact group for Syria (London 11)
- International Somalia Contact Group (since 1998)
- International Contact Group, part of the Framework Agreement on the Bangsamoro for the Southern Philippines Peace Process (2009)
- International Contact Group on Venezuela (since 2019)

== Literature ==
- I. Henneberg, 'International Contact Groups: Ad hoc coordination in international conflict management', in: South African Journal of International Affairs. Vol. 27, Nr. 4, 2020, p. 445-472. DOI: 10.1080/10220461.2020.1877190.
- M.P. Karns, ‘Ad Hoc Multilateral Diplomacy: The United States, the Contact Group, and Namibia,’in: International Organization 41, no. 1 (1987): 93–123
- C. Schwegmann,‘Modern Concert Diplomacy: The Contact Group and the G7/8 in Crisis Management,’ in: Guiding Global Order: G8 Governance in the Twentyfirst Century, ed. J.J. Kirton, J.P. Daniels, and A. Freytag (Ashgate, 2001), 93–121.
- K. Herbolzheimer and E. Leslie, Innovation in Mediation Support: The International Contact Group in Mindanao (2013).
