= Quito Process =

The Quito Process refers to the collective response of a group of Latin American countries to the Venezuelan migration crisis. This multilateral group was established after the proclamation of the Quito Declaration (officially the Declaration of Quito on human mobility of Venezuelan citizens in the region) on 4 September 2018 in the city of Quito, Ecuador. At Quito, representatives of 13 countries met with the aim of exchanging information and regional coordination of the Venezuelan refugee crisis response. On 23 November 2018, the Quito Plan was signed, which included deepening the mechanisms of Venezuelan migration, international financial cooperation, and coordination with international agencies. A third meeting was held on 8 and 9 April 2019.

Eleven American countries signed the Quito Declaration: Argentina, Brazil, Chile, Colombia, Costa Rica, Ecuador, Mexico, Panama, Paraguay, Peru and Uruguay. Bolivia and the Dominican Republic did not sign the document.

== Quito Declaration ==
At that meeting, the group signed an 18-point document titled Declaration of Quito on human mobility of Venezuelan citizens in the region. Though the document is not legally binding, it expresses commitment and support for Venezuelan citizens. In the document, the signatories declared:

1. Highlight the efforts undertaken by the governments of the region to adequately receive Venezuelan citizens in a situation of human mobility, especially those in vulnerable conditions, such as children and adolescents, the elderly, people with disabilities and people suffering from serious illnesses, among others.
2. Continue working individually and cooperate as each country deems appropriate and opportune, with the provision of humanitarian assistance; access to mechanisms for regular permanence, including the consideration of migration regularization processes; combating human trafficking and smuggling of migrants; combating sexual and gender-based violence; child protection; rejection of discrimination and xenophobia; access to procedures for determining refugee status; and, in general, continue working on the implementation of public policies aimed at protecting the human rights of all migrants; rejection of discrimination and xenophobia; access to refugee status determination procedures; and, in general, to continue working on the implementation of public policies aimed at protecting the human rights of all migrants in their respective countries, in accordance with national legislation and applicable international and regional instruments.
3. Recognize the importance of technical and financial cooperation provided by cooperating States and/or specialized international organizations, as appropriate, to address the extraordinary and increasing migratory flows of Venezuelan citizens in the region in the national spaces of each State.
4. Urge that such cooperation and resources be substantially increased, in accordance with the requirements of the volume of people who have emigrated from Venezuela to other countries in the region, and that they be directed to the sectors prioritized by each State, so that they can increase their actions and programs towards the regularization of migration.
5. To urge the Government of the Bolivarian Republic of Venezuela to urgently and as a matter of priority take the necessary measures for the timely provision of identity and travel documents for its nationals, such as identity cards, passports, birth certificates, marriage certificates and criminal record certificates, as well as the apostilles and legalizations required by its citizens, given that the lack of such documents has generated: limitations to the right to free circulation and mobility; difficulties in migratory procedures; impediments to extra-regional circulation; effects on social and economic insertion in the host countries; and, on the contrary, has encouraged irregular migration.
6. In accordance with the national legislation of each country, accept expired travel documents as identity documents for Venezuelan citizens for immigration purposes.
7. Establish a regional program, with the support of the United Nations System, particularly the International Organization for Migration (IOM), for the timely exchange of relevant information on Venezuelan migrants through the competent national bodies, in order to provide humanitarian aid and achieve orderly and safe migration.
8. To provide that the States of the region coordinate efforts through the Organization of American States (OAS), the International Organization for Migration (IOM), and other international organizations, in order to combat trafficking in persons and smuggling of migrants, within the migratory flow of Venezuelan citizens and in accordance with the provisions of the relevant international instruments.
9. Ratify the commitment of the States of the region, in accordance with the availability of public resources, the economic reality, internal regulations and the possibilities of each host country, to provide Venezuelan citizens in a situation of human mobility with access to public health and education services and opportunities in the labor market. Likewise, access to justice systems is guaranteed.
10. Recognize that a considerable volume of pendular and transit migration requires regional support and cooperation to strengthen measures for Colombia, given its border with Venezuela, as well as for Ecuador and Peru, given that it generates a migratory corridor to these two countries.
11. If necessary, strengthen the legal, regulatory and administrative norms of the States in the region in order to optimize the policies designed to promote and respect the rights of Venezuelan migrants in transit and host countries.
12. Ratify the commitments of the States of the region with respect to the coordinated fight against discrimination, intolerance and xenophobia and implement, to the extent possible for each country, individual and/or joint State initiatives and efforts in this regard.
13. Reiterate their concern over the serious deterioration of the internal situation caused by the massive migration of Venezuelans, addressed at this meeting, and call for the opening of a humanitarian assistance mechanism to decompress the critical situation, providing immediate attention at origin to the affected citizens.
14. The States agree to cooperate with each other to assist their nationals and urge the Government of the Bolivarian Republic of Venezuela to accept the cooperation of the governments of the region and international organizations in order to attend to the situation of their respective communities established in Venezuela.
15. To agree to hold a new Meeting on Human Mobility, focused on the critical situation of the extraordinary and increasing migratory flows of Venezuelan citizens, in principle, for the second week of November, in the city of Quito, in order to follow up on the commitments set forth in this Declaration.
16. Strengthen the role of CAN and MERCOSUR to address, in a comprehensive and coordinated manner, the massive flow of Venezuelan nationals and to take immediate action to address this humanitarian migratory crisis.
17. To thank all the International Organizations present at this Regional Meeting for their participation.
18. Special thanks to the Government of the Republic of Ecuador for the timely convening of the meeting and its hospitality during this working day.

== See also ==
- Lima Group
