= Reactions to the 2014 Venezuelan protests =

Reactions to the 2014 Venezuelan protests have been declared by numerous domestic and international organizations, responding to events occurring throughout the years of protests. The reactions are listed below.

== Reactions ==
=== Supranational bodies ===
- Bolivarian Alliance – rejected protests and supported Maduro's government.
- Caribbean Community – condemned the violence during the protests, calls for respect for the democratically elected government and Maduro. CARICOM said that every citizen has the right to peacefully express their views within the constitutional framework. The statement also called for dialogue between the parties.
- European Union – is deeply concerned about the incidents that took place in Caracas on 12 February, including the death of at least three people during protests and called on all parties to engage in dialogue to peacefully resolve the crisis. On 27 February 2014, the European Parliament said, "Only respect for fundamental rights, constructive and respectful dialogue and tolerance can help Venezuela to find a way out of its current violent crisis". In January and February 2015, MEPs condemned the arrest of protesters and began talks of possible targeted sanctions toward the Venezuelan government.
- Organization of American States – Secretary General José Miguel Insulza said that, "The Catholic Church or foreign ministers of South American countries could mediate between the government and the opposition in Venezuela". They also rejected violence, called for avoiding confrontation, called for a broad dialogue with respect for the law and also asked to investigate the deaths.
- Union of South American Nations – On 17 February 2014, UNASAR stated "We urge Venezuela to respect the democratic principles that are anchored in the process of regional integration." On 8 March, UNASUR said they would have a meeting of foreign ministers to talk about the unrest in Venezuela. The Chancellor of Ecuador, Ricardo Patiño, said a commission of the Union of South American Nations will hold a meeting in Caracas the 25 and 26 March to accompany the political dialogue.
- United Nations – is deeply concerned about the escalation of violence in Venezuela, including the death of at least three people during protests and called on all parties to engage in dialogue to peacefully resolve the crisis. OHCHR spokesperson Rupert Colville told reporters in Geneva: "We have also received worrying reports of intimidation of journalists, some of whom have had their equipment seized, as well as reports that some local and international journalists were attacked while covering the protests. In addition, some protestors have reportedly been detained and may be prosecuted on terrorism charges. It has also been reported that some protesters, including minors, are being denied contact with family or lawyers". United Nations Secretary of State Ban Ki-moon said that he, "urged Venezuelan authorities to listen to the legitimate aspirations of those protesting" and made no mentions of the National Peace Conference that President Maduro held. On 10 March, the United Nations received new allegations of torture with Special Rapporteur of the United Nations Convention against Torture, Juan Mendez, saying, "We want them to be thoroughly investigated; the tortures are very, very severe," and that, "We found the report credible enough to initiate such communication, but of course we are waiting for the government response." Méndez continued his statements saying that Leopoldo Lopez is in solitary confinement in a "dangerous" prison and that, "Mr. Lopez is accused of inciting the violent demonstrations and do so on behalf of foreign powers. The government has to prove it, but meanwhile, the act of stopping someone who has organized a peaceful demonstration, and just because some parts of this demonstration were violent, it seems excessive".

=== Governments ===
- Argentina – Ministry of Foreign Affairs said that, "After recent events in the Bolivarian Republic of Venezuela, the Argentine government reiterates its strong support for the constitutional government elected by the citizens of that country, and notes the clear efforts of destabilization that confront institutional order in our brother nation" and explained the "priority" of countries in the region to have "an active solidarity and common defense against the actions of authoritarian groups, corporations and those linked to financial and productive speculation".
- Australia – Former Minister for International Development and Australian MP Melissa Parke denounced the violent actions committed by the Venezuelan government and said, "The suppression of the media and the erosion of the rule of law in Venezuela is a very worrying step in the wrong direction for this once prosperous country. In my view, the government-led violence against civilians and the control of the media have no place in a peaceful and democratic Venezuela.
- Bolivia – Bolivian Foreign Minister David Choquehuanca said that Bolivia expressed "full support for democracy in Venezuela" and accused the Venezuelan opposition of staging a "coup".
- Brazil – Brazilian officials close to the President of Brazil, Dilma Rousseff, said she was "disappointed" with some of President Maduro's acts and was worried about the "Venezuelan government's repression of recent street protests, and Maduro's refusal to hold genuine dialogue with opposition leaders" and spoke cautiously in order to be able to keep in dialogue with President Maduro. Foreign Minister of Brazil, Luiz Alberto Figueiredo, said that the government pays close attention to the Venezuelan situation and hoped that a convergence can be found, he also expressed hopes that the riots will stop and lamented on behalf of the Brazilian government, the loss of life and the destroyed property during demonstrations. Ricardo Ferrao, President of the Committee on Foreign Affairs and Defence of the Senate of the Federal Republic of Brazil stated that the Brazilian senate had asked the executive branch that is headed by President Rousseff to "manifest itself in protecting the integrity of the determined opposition" and to protect María Corina Machado saying the actions taken against her were "evidence of abuse of rights and guarantees of due process principles enshrined in the Universal Declaration of Human Rights of the United Nations".
- Canada – Minister of Foreign Affairs of Canada, John Baird, said "We are alarmed by the increasing violence and arrests, injuries and deaths during protests. Our deepest condolences to the families of the victims", he asked that all detainees, all deaths and reports of abuses by the government security forces are investigated.
- Chile – Outgoing President of the Republic of Chile Sebastián Piñera said, "We call on all parties to act in the way democracy is to respect the liberties, freedom of expression and human rights of all citizens by the government, and respect the rule of law and peace manifested by citizens," Chile also regretted the deaths in Caracas and expressed its condolences to the people and government of the Bolivarian Republic of Venezuela, especially the families of the victims. Chile also encourages an "open and constructive dialogue". The Embassy of Chile accepted reports from some opposition members "that collects the continuing violations of human rights that have exposed thousands of Venezuelans," with Chilean ambassador Mauricio Ugalde saying, "I formally request that at the next meeting of UNASUR, the learning that has been left by the Chilean people, their incessant struggle for investigation and defense of human rights characterized their position in the Venezuelan conflict".
- China – Spokesperson of the Ministry of Foreign Affairs of China Hua Chunying said, "We believe that the Venezuelan government and its people have the ability to properly manage their internal affairs, maintain national stability and promote social and economic development" and urged the United States and Venezuela to improve relations saying, "We hope that both sides adhere to the principles of equality and mutual respect, increase dialogue and improve relations. This kind of mutual respect and equal footing serves the interests of both countries and contributes to the overall development of the entire Latin American region".
- Colombia – President of Colombia Juan Manuel Santos was concerned and said, "From Colombia, I would like to call for calm, for opening channels of communication among the different political forces in Venezuela in order to ensure the stability of the country and respect for institutions and fundamental freedoms". Colombia also deplored the violence and expressed condolences to the families, the people and the Venezuelan government. Also called for dialogue and said that Venezuela's stability is important to Colombia, Venezuela itself and the region. Colombia, the United States and other countries have also been in talks about potentially mediating in Venezuela.
- Costa Rica – The Costa Rican government deplored the violence, called on the Venezuelan authorities to "investigate and establish responsibilities for the victims and wounded," said he has hopes that "being resolved by way of dialogue and understanding" are achieved and that is a matter that concerns Costa Rica but that Venezuelans should resolve without interference. The Legislature of Costa Rica also expressed that they were "appalled by the climate of violence, intolerance and the arrest and prosecution lifting immunity without just cause or process attached to the rule of law democratically elected political leaders, civil society leaders, students and opposition leaders" and called for "national, regional and other actors to make an appeal to parliaments real, independent and constructive dialogue based on enforceable commitments in respect of international law".
- Cuba – The Cuban Ministry of Foreign Affairs condemned the Venezuelan opposition, calling their demonstrations "coup attempts" and expressed solidarity with the government of Maduro.
- Denmark – President of the Parliament of Denmark, Mogens Lykketoft, said in a meeting with Mexico that they wanted to "contribute towards a solution" to the situation in Venezuela.
- Germany – Foreign Minister of Germany, Frank-Walter Steinmeier, saw "great concern" with the violence and spokesman of the German Foreign Ministry, Sawsan Chebli, said, "We must respect the right to peaceful protest. Criminalization of protesters and opponents and the use of military forces are not the right steps towards a peaceful solution." concluding that, "This call is primarily directed to the Venezuelan government".
- Guatemala – The Government of Guatemala said that it "rejects violence and promotes citizen security and stability in the country. Likewise, believes that at all times the democratic institutions and the full respect for human rights must be guaranteed" and asked for "dialogue among all sectors". The Congress of Guatemala said that "it is evident that there are attacks on the press and free speech by censoring news and digital media such as social networks and others that do not allow the diffusion of the real situation" and expressed "opposition to any measure of government persecution and repression by groups protected by the government against political parties, civil movements and citizens who peacefully express their discontent.
- Guyana – Government of Guyana rejected the violence in Venezuela, expressed solidarity with the Venezuelan government and states that it fully supports its efforts to contain the destabilizing actions.
- Iran – Ministry of Foreign Affairs of Iran spokeswoman Marzieh Afkham condemned vandalism, the murder of innocent civilians, destroying of public property and any other actions that creates instability for Venezuela. She also said that Venezuela has the full support of Iran "to strengthen peace, friendship and enhance democracy and the stable development" of Venezuela.
- Mexico – The Mexican Secretariat of Foreign Affairs said that they regretted the violence, expressed its condolences to the families of the dead.
- Nicaragua – The First Lady of Nicaragua and presidential spokeswoman, Rosario Murillo, accused the "fascist right" of violence and expressed support for the government of President Maduro.
- Panama – Foreign Minister of Panama, Francisco Alvarez de Soto, said his government is concerned about the Venezuelan situation and understands that it is an internal process but Panama wishes for peace, tolerance and dialogue. President Maduro accused Panama of pushing for regional organizations to intervene in Venezuela and on 5 March severed diplomatic relations. President Ricardo Martinelli has called on Venezuela not to default on its debt that tops US$1billion because of severed diplomatic relations.
- Peru – President of the Republic of Peru Ollanta Humala said, "I call upon the Government of Venezuela, its authorities, its political forces and citizens, to make maximum efforts for democracy and respect for the rights of all persons, regardless of their political position prevails," and concluded his statement saying, "Defend the climate of peace because peace can only strengthen our democracies, build prosperity and development for our peoples," Ministry of Foreign Affairs stated that they are deeply concerned with the violence in Venezuela. They recommended dialogue between groups with respect to democratic values and human rights. Peru also shared condolences for the victims and those injured in the protests. Three members of the Congress of Peru, Martín Belaúnde, Luis Galarreta and Cecilia Chacón, helped shelter opposition leader María Corina Machado when she arrived in Venezuela with Galarreta saying, "We came to support Maria Corina Machado by this unusual and unacceptable arbitrariness that you want to do."
- Russia – The Russian Foreign Ministry expressed concern about the unrest in Venezuela and also trusts that the government of President Maduro will preserve the constitutional order. Russia also shows its "solidarity with the government and people, and strong support for the policy that aims to prevent the destabilization of a nation".
- Spain – The Spanish Congress of Deputies asked the Venezuelan government to respect democracy, human rights and to end "all forms of harassment towards the peaceful opposition". They also asked for the government to stop paramilitary groups from being able to, "act with impunity attacking protesters and activists of the Venezuelan opposition" and for President Maduro to stop the "harassment of the media critical of his regime" Spain has also stopped exporting riot control agents to Venezuela to help start dialogue between the Venezuelan government and the opposition.
- Syria – President of Syria Bashar al-Assad expressed his support in a letter to President Maduro, to reject the "attempt to sow chaos" in both Syria and Venezuela, expressing confidence that Venezuela will surpass this experience with the achievements and legacy of former president Hugo Chávez.
- United Kingdom – Foreign Minister of the United Kingdom, William Hague said that the Government of the United Kingdom is "very concerned about the violence" in the demonstrations and "reports of arrests of opposition activists" and said that the Venezuelan government should uphold "freedom of the press and opinion".
- United States – After the Venezuelan government ordered three United States diplomats out of the country, accusing them of organizing the protests in order to overthrow the government, the U.S. responded on 25 February by expelling three Venezuelan diplomats from their country. Multiple officials from the United States condemned the handling of the protests by the Venezuelan government. Some officials proposing targeted sanctions on Venezuelan government officials that they say violated human rights, however, these proposed sanctions have been debated.

- President of the United States Barack Obama stated, "Rather than trying to distract from protests by making false accusations against U.S. diplomats, Venezuela's government should address the people's legitimate grievances." and called on Venezuela to release detained protesters. President Obama also said, "Along with the Organization of American States, we call on the Venezuelan government to release protesters it has detained and engage in real dialogue." In a personal letter to a resident of Miami, President Obama also said that "he was concerned for the Venezuelan people and is working behind the scenes to do what he can to support the people oppressed".
- Vice President of the United States Joe Biden called the situation "alarming", accused the government of, "Confronting peaceful protesters with force and in some cases with armed vigilantes; limiting the freedoms of press and assembly necessary for legitimate political debate; demonizing and arresting political opponents; and dramatically tightening restrictions on the media" and said that instead of working on dialogue, "Maduro has thus far tried to distract his people from the profound issues at stake in Venezuela by concocting totally false and outlandish conspiracy theories about the United States."
- United States Secretary of State John Kerry expressed grievances towards affected families of the violence and is "particularly alarmed by reports that the Venezuelan government has arrested or detained scores of anti-government protesters and issued an arrest warrant for Leopoldo Lopez". Days later, John Kerry said, "The government's use of force and judicial intimidation against citizens and political figures, who are exercising a legitimate right to protest, is unacceptable and will only increase the likelihood of violence."
- John F. Kelly, United States Marine Corps general and Commander of the United States Southern Command, said to a Senate committee that in Venezuela, "It is a situation that is obviously just coming apart in front us, and unless there is some type of a miracle that either the opposition or the Maduro government pulls out, they are going down catastrophically in terms of economy, in terms of democracy," Kelly also wished that, "somehow Venezuelans resolve this themselves" and that, "larger U.S. government agencies are paying close attention" to monitor the cyber tools the Venezuelan government is allegedly using against its citizens.
- Members of the United States Congress pushed for the United States to place sanctions on Venezuela due to human rights violations during the protests. However, President Obama only concentrated on imposing individual sanctions on Venezuelan officials. On 5 March, John Kerry said that the United States was ready to place sanctions on Venezuela if the OAS did not get involved with dialogue. On 8 May, the United States Senate Committee on Foreign Relations held a hearing discussing human rights violations by the Venezuelan government and proposals of sanctions by Congresswoman Ileana Ros-Lehtinen that later passed through the House Foreign Affairs Committee. The bill, called the Venezuelan Human Rights and Democracy Protection Act (H.R. 4587; 113th Congress), passed the House of Representatives in a voice vote on May 28, 2014. The sanctions performed under the bill would be directed at Venezuelan government officials who were involved in acts that mistreated protesters and would result in those who were sanctioned having their assets frozen and being barred from entering the United States.
- On 30 July, the spokeswoman for the State Department, Marie Harf, stated that, "The Secretary of State decided to impose restrictions on travel to the United States a number of Venezuelan officials responsible for or complicit in human rights violations" and concluded stating "Our message is clear: those who commit such abuses will not be welcome in the United States".
- On 20 November, the US Deputy National Security Advisor of President Obama, Tony Blinken, stated that the Obama administration would work with the United States Congress to move forward and impose targeted sanctions on Venezuela after diplomatic efforts by Latin American countries failed to release opposition leaders and lead toward electoral changes. A month later on 18 December 2014, President Obama sign the Venezuela Defense of Human Rights and Civil Society Act of 2014 into law, granting targeted sanctions such as freezing assets or denying visas of those in Venezuela accused of violating human rights during the protests.

- Uruguay – President of Uruguay José Mujica considered that the demonstrations are a result of the ongoing economic crisis in Venezuela.
- Holy See – Secretary of State of the Vatican, Monsignor Pietro Parolin, met with Jorge Roig discussing the situation in Venezuela and the need for dialogue. Parolin once again affirmed the Catholic Church's commitment to help bring peace to the people of Venezuela.

=== Catholic Church ===
Holy See – Pope Francis asked for an end to violence and said, "I sincerely hope the violence and hostility ends as soon as possible, and that the Venezuelan people, beginning with the responsible politicians and institutions, act to foster national reconciliation through mutual forgiveness and sincere dialogue."

- The president of the Venezuelan Bishops Conference, Bishop Diego Padrón said that, "the claim of the official party and authorities of the Republic to implement the so-called plan of the country (established by the late President Hugo Chavez), behind which the imposition of a totalitarian government is hiding" and denounced "the abusive and excessive repression against them (the protesters), the torture they have undergone many of the detainees and the prosecution mayors and contrary Members of the ruling (...) The government is wrong to want to solve the crisis by force, repression is not the way". Padrón also asked the government to, "ensure protection for the demonstrators, to provide explanations for the arrests and list charges against those in custody, and to listen to the people". The Venezuelan Bishops Conference condemned the government over an abuse of authority saying it "has gone beyond the limits causing unfortunate and irreversible consequences" and asked the government to stop "colectivos" from "committing criminal actions". On 11 July, during the 102nd Ordinary Meeting of the Venezuelan Episcopal Conference (CEV), the CEV demanded the release of political prisoners, said that a "totalitarian political model and a centralized education" is threatening in Venezuela, denounced criminalization of the protests and said there will be no solution to the protests until the "causes of the protests are met".
  - Cardinal Jorge Urosa Savino said that he has seen some vandalism by opposition protesters, but with the government, "There is a serious violation of human rights that must be addressed and must be punished" and that, "deaths and injuries are from attacks against peaceful demonstrations".
  - Monsignor Victor Hugo Basabe said that some churches were attacked during masses and that, "We have churches in areas where conflict has been high and have also been attacked by violent groups,"
  - Monsignor Ovidio Pérez Morales called the government's "Homeland" plan "unconstitutional" and said that it is trying to implement "Castro-socialism".

=== Others ===
- Amnesty International – Amnesty International has asked the government to investigate the deaths. Guadalupe Marengo said: "It is extremely concerning that violence has become a regular feature during protests in Venezuela. If the authorities are truly committed to preventing more deaths, they must ensure those responsible for the violence, demonstrators, security forces and armed civilians alike face justice. The Venezuelan authorities must show they are truly committed to respect people's rights to freedom of expression, association and assembly by ensuring they can participate in protests without fear of being abused, detained or even killed. It is essential that journalists are allowed to report events freely and human right defenders are able to monitor demonstrations.". They have claimed that the government has started a "witch hunt against opposition leaders" after the arrest of Daniel Ceballos.
- Carter Center and the Friends of the Inter-American Democratic Charter – a 20 February statement strongly condemned the detention of students; expressed particular concern about the arrest of Lopez and the raid of the office of his political party without a warrant; and expressed similar concern about the obstacles to media reporting. Point-by-point, they "condemned" the "repression of peaceful demonstrations and the arbitrary detention of Venezuelan students" and the "arbitrary arrest of political leaders"; called for the release of detainees and independent inquiries into the violence; asked the Venezuelan government to adhere to the Inter-American Democratic Charter; and reminded all Venezuelans that protests should be peaceful.
- Club de Madrid – A group of 96 former heads of government of numerous countries gathered denouncing the "rapid deterioration" of human rights in Venezuela and signed a statement asking the government, "to immediately release political prisoners and Leopoldo López and the cessation of the persecution of political leaders" and asked the international community "to join in a concerted effort to strengthen democracy and the preservation of peace in Venezuela".
- Council on Hemispheric Affairs – commends the Venezuelan government for "show[ing] restraint and resolve in the face of violent anti-Chavista mayhem."
- European United Left–Nordic Green Left – condemns "the attempted coup in Venezuela, violence by opposition groups in Venezuela, and regrets the loss of life and destruction of public property in the country. We likewise denounce the undemocratic and insurgent aims of this destabilisation campaign, unleashed onto the streets of Caracas and other Venezuelan cities by extremist groups. We hold the opposition forces and the Venezuelan right (supported by the U.S. with links to the dominant forces in the EU) responsible for these actions and their dire consequences".
- Human Rights Foundation – condemned the crackdown on the political opposition with the chairman of Human Rights Foundation, Garry Kasparov, saying, "The shadow of dictatorship is quickly falling upon Venezuela. The imprisonment of a prominent human rights activist and hundreds of students inside the political police's dungeons is a step toward the complete silencing of civil society by the Venezuelan regime".
- Human Rights Watch – José Miguel Vivanco, Americas director at Human Rights Watch, said: "What Venezuela urgently needs is for these killings to be investigated and the killers brought to justice, no matter their political affiliation. What Venezuela does not need is authorities scapegoating political opponents or shutting down news outlets whose coverage they don't like."
- International Socialist Committee for Latin America and the Caribbean – asked the Venezuelan government for the release of "all students and political prisoners and an end to the persecution of opponents" and also asked for the life and safety of Venezuelans.
- Robert F. Kennedy Center for Justice and Human Rights - President Kerry Kennedy said she is "deeply concerned about the deaths during protests, censorship and intimidation against members of the press, and arrests of students and opposition leaders" and condemned "government repression of peaceful demonstrators and the arrest of elected officials".
- Socialist International – Socialist International said they understood the causes for protest because of "people being killed and injured, opposition leaders being persecuted, with restrictions on freedoms, including the freedom of information, amongst others". Socialist International also condemned the deaths of protesters asking the government to stop irregular groups that shot protesters from acting with impunity.
- Washington Office on Latin America – called for "renewed commitment to dialogue on behalf of the government and protesters alike", and encouraged "both President Maduro and opposition leaders to take every opportunity to unequivocally condemn acts of violence, regardless of the source."
- Hackers from multiple countries, including the internet vigilante group Anonymous, have infiltrated Venezuelan government websites due to the alleged repression and censorship of the people in Venezuela. A member of Anonymous said, "I would say this is one of the biggest cooperative operations involving South American Anons and Anons from the rest of the world to date" when members of another hacker group, LulzSecPeru, also hacked into the government's United Socialist Party of Venezuela Twitter official account.
- International celebrities DJ Steve Aoki, Cher and Rihanna all asked for prayers and peace in Venezuela. At the 2014 Oscars, Jared Leto said in solidarity with the opposition during his acceptance speech for best supporting actor, "To all the dreamers out there around the world watching this tonight in places like Ukraine and Venezuela, I want to say we are here, and as you struggle to make your dreams happen and live the impossible, we are thinking of you tonight." Also, during the 2014 Oscars, Kevin Spacey said, "Venezuela don't give up, everybody has the right to express themselves!" with Forest Whitaker also saying he was "deeply saddened by the violence in Venezuela" and that, "Everybody has the right to have their voice heard." Madonna took sides with the opposition saying, "Apparently Maduro is not familiar with the phrase "Human Rights"! Fascism is alive and thriving in Venezuela and Russia." Singers Enrique Iglesias, Willie Colón, and Rubén Blades also supported the opposition, with Blades criticizing President Maduro for not being able to "direct such a complex country". Maduro responded to Blades's criticism by inviting him to the country to perform a peace song along with Maduro which Blades turned down. Colón retweeted photos of the protests while saying to the president "Nicolás the blood of the students will choke you!" Twelve Venezuelan baseball players for the Detroit Tigers including Miguel Cabrera, Victor Martinez and Aníbal Sánchez showed their support for the opposition holding signs saying "SOS Venezuela" or "Pray for Venezuela". The Venezuelan protests became the highlight of the 2014 Lo Nuestro Awards where artists including Marc Anthony, Marco Antonio Solís, Banda el Recodo, and Chino & Nacho expressed prayer and a call for the violence to end. Miss Universe 2013, Maria Gabriela Isler, attended the Carolina Herrera Fashion Show and said, "To all Venezuelans have in my heart all day, and although we are going through very difficult times, I want you to know that I do not believe in coincidences and God gave me the opportunity for Venezuela, this year – around the world and to represent and raise my voice for each of my brothers. We are a fighting people, but above all, we are a people of faith, so God willing things will be better ... We must have faith". Maria also criticized the Venezuelan government, especially after she had to deal with shortages, no electricity and her lack of safe drinking water. Singers Ricardo Montaner, Juanes, and Luis Fonsi have also expressed their solidarity to Venezuela holding signs saying "Pray for Venezuela".

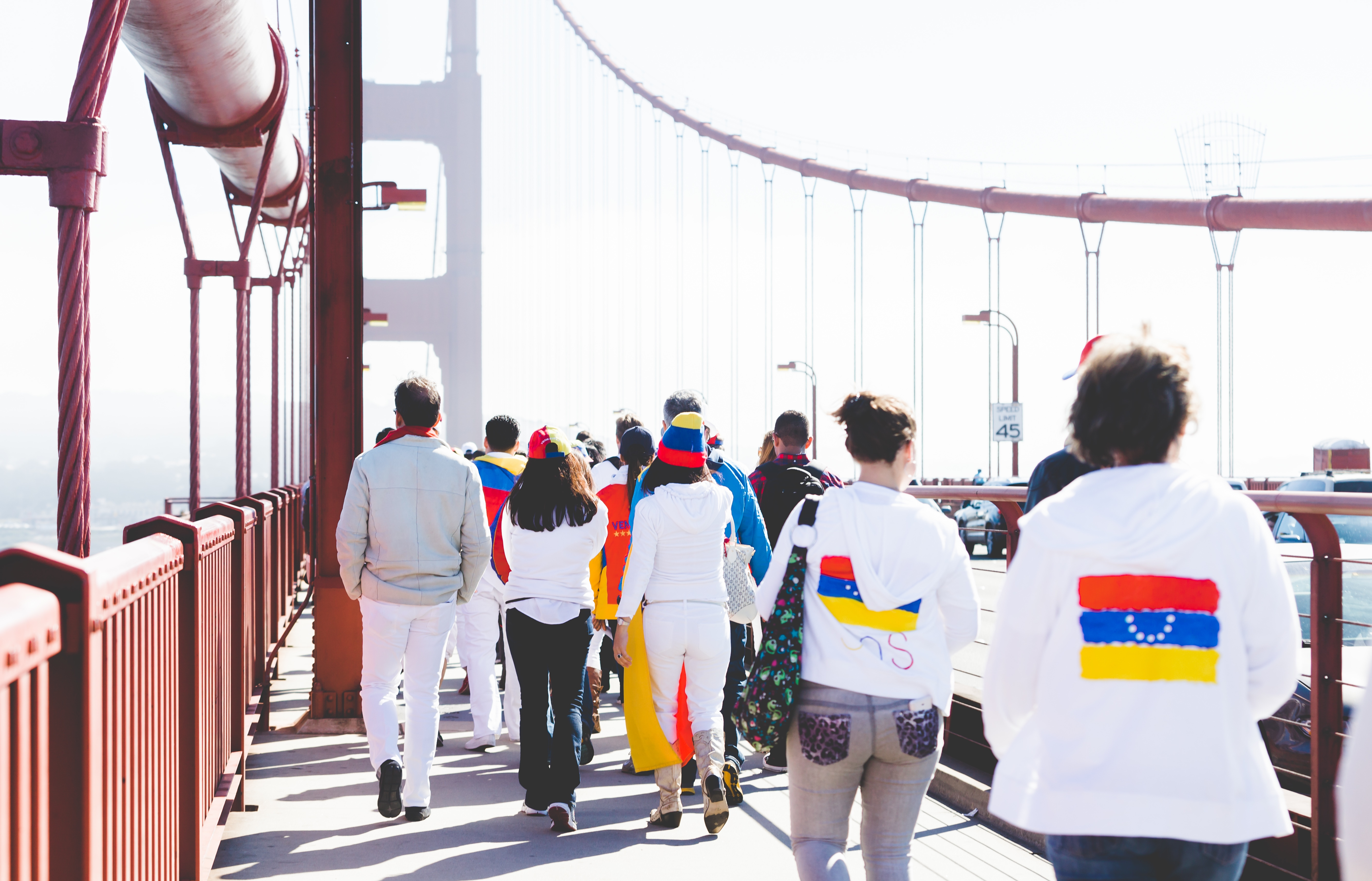
Demonstrators showing solidarity with opposition protesters on the Golden Gate Bridge in San Francisco, California.

- There were also protests in other countries, some in support of President Maduro and some against him. Across the United States hundreds of Venezuelan Americans gathered who sympathize with the protesters. In Canada, protestors in Calgary gathered on Peace Bridge to support the opposition and called on the Government of Canada to put pressure on the Venezuelan government. A Venezuelan opposition group, Un Mundo Sin Mordaza, has created the Gran Protesta Mundial, a worldwide protest movement denouncing alleged "violation of human rights" by the Venezuelan government. It seeks to carry out protests in over 150 cities in dozens of countries including Argentina, Australia, Bolivia, United Kingdom and the United States. In Doral, Florida, more than 20,000 protesters were at the SOS Venezuela rally that was part of the Gran Protesta Mundial. In San Francisco, California, demonstrators dressed in colors of the Venezuelan flag made a human chain across the Golden Gate Bridge to raise awareness about government corruption and freedom of expression in Venezuela. In Washington, D.C., hundreds of protesters gathered in front of the White House, protesting against the Venezuelan government, violence and for the release of opposition leader, Leopoldo Lopez. In Argentina protests were held both in support and against of Maduro. In Ukraine, protesters from the current 2014 Ukrainian Revolution in Kyiv showed their support to the opposition saying, "Venezuela-Ukraine together for freedom and dignity." In the cities of Geneva and Zurich, Switzerland, protesters showed solidarity with the opposition and protested against censorship and police repression in front of the United Nations Office at Geneva. In Brazil, Canada, Colombia, Mexico, Spain, United States and other countries, the organization VenMundo made the "JusticiaYPazVzla" human chain to show support for Venezuelan political prisoners and students. A protest was held on 9 April in New York against the US intervention in the conflict. Their motto was "End the media's lies about Ukraine and Venezuela!". The group Venezuela Solidarity has called for demonstrations supporting Maduro's government in Toronto
- On 6 March 2014, a group of United Nations independent experts asked the Government of Venezuela for prompt clarification of allegations of arbitrary detention and excessive use of force and violence against protesters, journalists and media workers during the recent wave of protests in the country. The human rights experts, who acknowledged the call for a national dialogue made by President Nicolás Maduro, emphasized the importance of fully guaranteeing the rights to freedom of peaceful assembly, association, opinion and expression in this critical context. "The reconciliatory dialogue that is so deeply needed in Venezuela is not going to take place if political leaders, students, media groups and journalists are harassed and intimidated by the authorities," they stressed.

== See also ==
- Reactions to the 2017 Venezuelan protests
- Responses to the Venezuelan presidential crisis
- International Conference on the Situation in Venezuela
