= International Somalia Contact Group =

The International Somalia Contact Group is an informal, ad-hoc formed International Contact Group of mainly western UN Ambassadors that was established at the United Nations headquarters in New York City in June 2006 to support "peace and reconciliation" in Somalia.

== Members ==
The original members of the group were:

- United States - at whose initiative the group formed
- Norway - which chaired the first meeting
- Italy
- Sweden
- Tanzania
- United Kingdom
- The European Union Presidency and Commission

Invited as observers were:

- The African Union
- The Intergovernmental Authority on Development
- The League of Arab States
- The United Nations

Kenya was reported to have been unhappy that it had not been invited to join the group.
