= Bowling Industry Online =

American magazine

Bowling Industry Online is a monthly ten-pin bowling magazine published by B2B Media Inc. The magazine was established in 1993. It has its headquarters in Studio City, California.
