= Governance and Economic Management Assistance Program =

The Governance and Economic Management Assistance Program (GEMAP) is an effort, started September 2005, by the Liberian government and the international community, via the International Contact Group on Liberia (ICGL) to reshape the fundamentally broken system of governance that contributed to 23 years of conflict in Liberia.

== Description ==
The design of GEMAP began shortly after the end of Liberia's fourteen-year civil war in 2003. The war ended with the signing of the Comprehensive Peace Agreement (CPA) on August 18, 2003, resulting in the resignation of Charles Taylor, President since 1997. A national transitional government (NTGL) was established to follow a timeline leading up to an election slated for 2005, with Ellen Johnson Sirleaf assuming the presidency on Jan. 18, 2006.

After a 2005 European Commission audit of Liberia's Central Bank and five state-owned enterprises revealed systemic corruption, the international community began to discuss how best to respond to the ongoing corruption before the country relapsed into civil war, and thus GEMAP emerged with the purpose of:

“To ensure that all Liberian revenues will be available for the benefit of all Liberian people, to ensure that the Liberian Government will have the appropriate fiscal instruments to capture the revenue required for the development of the country, and to strengthen Liberian institutions so that they can take responsibility for reversing decades of deficiencies in economic and financial management, the NTGL and its partners have concluded that immediate remedial action is needed.”

The program was designed and funded by the IMF, World Bank, the U.S. Treasury Department and USAID. United States Government-funded GEMAP activities were implemented by IBI, Segura, and TRAWOCO. It involved embedding non-Liberian financial controllers within Liberian institutions. These “advisors” had co-signatory authority over major financial transactions. The six GEMAP components were:

1. Financial Management and Accountability
2. Improving Budgeting and Expenditure Management
3. Improving Procurement Practices and Granting of Concessions
4. Establishing Effective Processes to Control Corruption
5. Supporting Key Institutions
6. Capacity Building

The four state-owned enterprises addressed by the program are:

- National Port Authority (NPA)
- Liberia Petroleum Refining Company (LPRC)
- Roberts International Airport (RIA)
- Forestry Development Authority (FDA)

== Reception ==
GEMAP's effectiveness is a point of contention as there is evidence to support both sides. Proponents argue that the nature of the program, with its 'intrusive' financial controls and arbitration body for resolving disputes with the executive directly, sent a strong message to the Liberian elite that the corruption of the past would no longer be tolerated. In fact, there is considerable anecdotal evidence that GEMAP introduced an element of accountability into the bureaucracy that hadn't existed for over a generation. In this sense, GEMAP has accomplished its goal of modifying the conversation about corruption to a direction of reform. However, the Johnson-Sirleaf government has also taken a pro-reform platform, so responsibility for this cultural (if not practical,) shift may never be known.

Critics argue that the program has been ineffective in combating corruption, and that the situation is as bad or worse than in previous administrations. They note that rampant corruption still persists in GEMAP institutions like the National Port Authority, and recent criticisms about the national budget cast doubt on the transparency of revenue intake and outflows. Others have renewed protests against GEMAP, claiming that it was developed in the context of the highly corrupt transitional government, and the responsibility demonstrated by the Sirleaf government demands a reduction of the oversight.

GEMAP was never designed to 'fix' the corruption problem in Liberia. Only a generation of law enforcement, governance reform, technical assistance and education can hope to tackle that monumental problem. GEMAP was designed as economic 'triage' for a hemorrhaging (= 'bleeding') country, and in that narrow view, it can be considered a success, partly due to the 50% year-to-year increases in government revenue, the government's review of contracts and concessions (and renegotiation of the Mittal and Firestone contracts), reforms in the timber and diamond sectors, and the general high-level commitment to improved financial controls.

== Awareness ==
GEMAP is under consideration by both academics and policy makers as a tool for other post-conflict states. With greater awareness by donors that they function as 'investors' in developing countries, it is likely that additional GEMAP-like programs will be created in the future in order to provide the 'investors' some measure of reassurance that their 'partners' are in fact spending their money, as well as the donors' money, responsibly and with accountability.
