= International Contact Group on Liberia =

The International Contact Group on Liberia (ICGL) is an ad-hoc formed International Contact Group composed of members from the United Nations, the Economic Community of West African States (ECOWAS), African Union, World Bank, United States, Ghana, Nigeria, United Kingdom, Germany, Spain and Sweden. The ICGL was formed from a need for an international and regional response to the Second Liberian Civil War. The ICGL was cited by the Accra Comprehensive Peace Accord with a number of tasks, most notably ensuring the faithful implementation of the accord by all parties. In September 2005, the ICGL and the Government of Liberia signed GEMAP, a novel approach to the problem of systemic political corruption.

The ICGL now functions under a broader, regional institution called the International Contact Group on the Mano River Basin.
