= Beatriz Becerra =

Spanish writer and politician (born 1966)

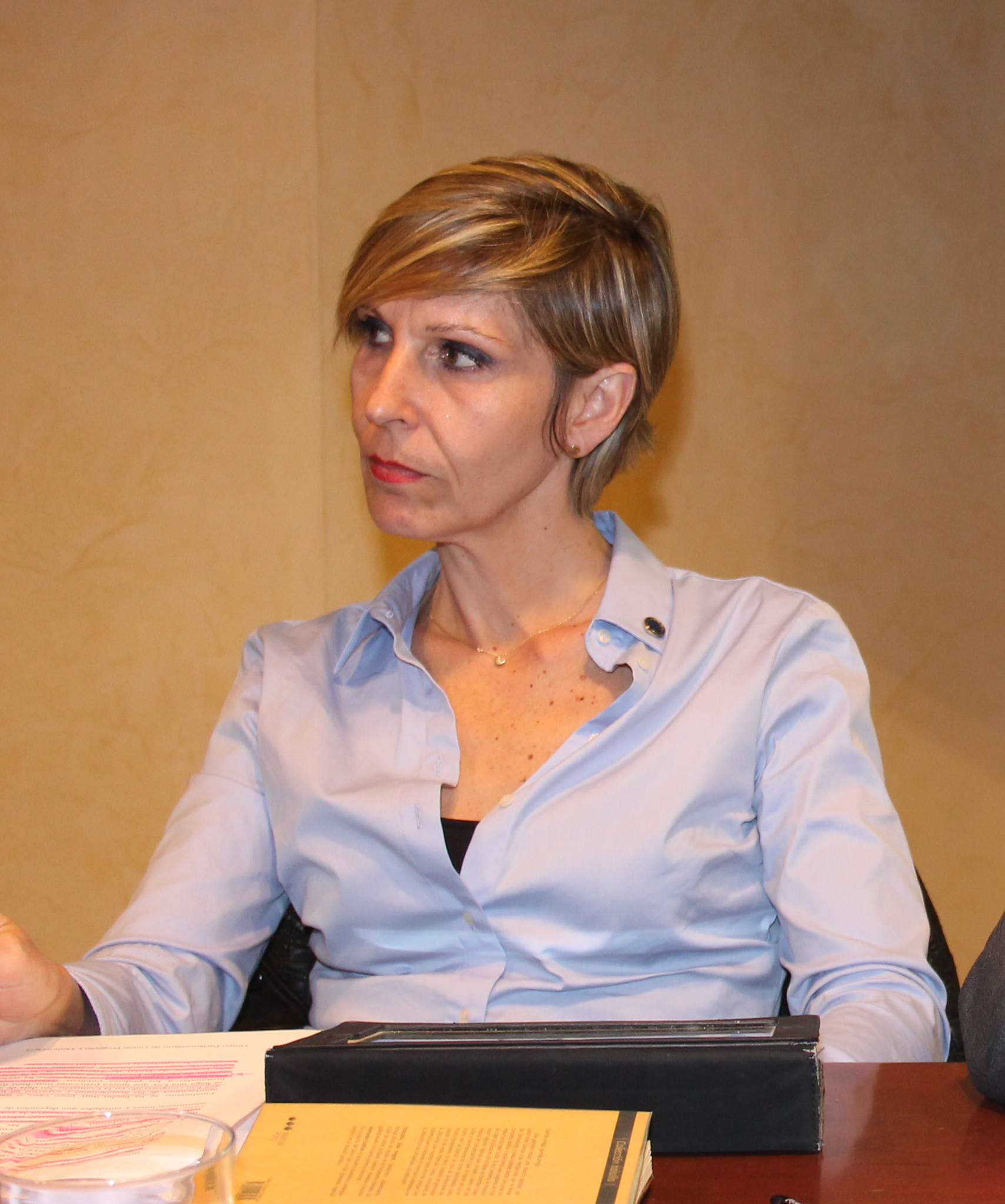
- Beatriz Becerra

Member of the European Parliament
- In office 25 May 2014 – 2019

Personal details
- Born: Beatriz Becerra Basterrechea; 14 November 1966 (age 59) Madrid, Spain
- Party: Union, Progress and Democracy (2008–2016); Independent (2016–present)
- Education: Complutense University of Madrid
- Occupation: Politician; Businesswoman; Teacher; Writer
- Website: beatrizbecerra.eu

Beatriz Becerra Basterrechea (born 14 November 1966) is a Spanish writer and politician who served as a Member of the European Parliament from 2014 until 2019.

In parliament, Becerra served as vice-chair of the European Parliament Subcommittee on Human Rights, and is a member of the Alliance of Liberals and Democrats for Europe group (ALDE).

From 2009 to 2014 Becerra was on the board of directors of Union, Progress and Democracy (UPyD) as its communication manager. She was elected a Member of the European Parliament (MEP) in 2014 after joining the UPyD list.

== Biography ==
Beatriz Becerra graduated in Industrial Psychology from the Complutense University of Madrid in 1989. She has also completed a Master's in Business Administration and Management.

From 1989 to 2005 she worked in the audiovisual sector at multinationals such as CBS (where she got her first job) and Buena Vista International Spain (owned by The Walt Disney Company). From 1998 to 2005 she worked at Sony Pictures Entertainment, where she became Director of Marketing and Sales for Spain and Portugal. She also worked for the NGO Action Against Hunger and as a consultant for Discovery Networks.

In addition, she developed a teaching career in postgraduate studies between 1998 and 2014 at the Villanueva University Center and Comillas Pontifical University. As a writer, she has published three novels: Las criadas de Caifás, La reina del Plata, and La estirpe de los niños infelices.

Without prior political affiliation, in 2008 Becerra joined Union, Progress and Democracy, a Spanish political party founded in 2007 and whose leader was then Rosa Díez. At the UPyD Congress held in 2009 she was elected to the main executive body, the board of directors, to be part of the candidacy headed by Díez. For the next four and a half years, she was responsible for the party's communications.

Becerra stood for the European Parliament elections of 25 May 2014 on the UPyD list. She was elected when her party received 6.5% of the votes and four seats. UPyD joined the Alliance of Liberals and Democrats for Europe group, chaired by Belgian Guy Verhofstadt.

During the months following the elections, UPyD suffered a series of internal and electoral crises that ended with the withdrawal of Rosa Díez and her party from the Congress of Deputies and leaving it with hardly any relevant public offices. On 1 April 2016, Becerra announced, along with other UPyD members and officeholders, that she was leaving the party because "it had ceased to be useful to society." She continues as an independent MEP within ALDE.

== Activity in the European Parliament ==
After becoming a Member of the European Parliament, Beatriz Becerra joined the Committees on Employment and Social Affairs, Women's Rights and Gender Equality, and Petitions. In November 2014 she left the first of these and joined the Development Committee and the Human Rights subcommittee, of which she is vice-chair. In addition, she is part of the delegations of the European Parliament in the Euro-Latin American Parliamentary Assembly and the EU-Mexico Joint Parliamentary Committee. She is also a substitute in the Delegation for Relations with Japan.

Her parliamentary activity has focused, among other issues, on the defense of human rights, gender equality, economic and social development, access to medicines, and support for entrepreneurs and startups. In 2016, she presented the candidacy of Yazidi activist Nadia Murad Basee to ALDE for the Sakharov Prize for freedom of conscience. ALDE supported this candidacy, and on 27 October of the same year it was announced that the European Parliament awarded the Sakharov Prize to Murad and Lamiya Aji Bashar, also a Yazidi activist.

In September 2016, Becerra presented the Alliance of Women Against Radicalization and Extremism (AWARE) platform, a network oriented to the study and prevention of radicalization from a gender perspective, and which defends the creation of a common European policy on respect. The platform has the support of women such as Nadia Murad and Miriam González Durántez.

She has been a speaker in the European Parliament's report on mental health and gender equality, which raised the need to incorporate a gender perspective in research and treatment of diseases.

In international politics, she has stood out for her support to the Venezuelan opposition in its confrontation with the government of Nicolás Maduro, leading ALDE's negotiation on a resolution of the European Parliament that demanded, among other measures, the release of political prisoners.

In 2017, after several months of protests in Venezuela, Becerra promoted the candidacy of the Venezuelan political opposition for the Sakharov Prize. Becerra has been singled out and intimidated by members of the Venezuelan government for her persistent defense of the freedom of Venezuelans. In June 2018, she vsisted Cúcuta, a border city between Colombia and Venezuela, as part of a parliamentary mission to observe the situation of Venezuelan refugees arriving there.

She joined the task force of MEPs on Brexit, with a special focus on guaranteeing the rights of Europeans residing in the United Kingdom, and of British residents of the EU after the referendum that approved the abandonment of the European institutions.

On 7 July 2017, in response to a letter from the MEP, European Commission President Jean-Claude Juncker confirmed that, if the secession of Catalonia were to take place, the new state would automatically be excluded from the European Union. In September, the president of the European Parliament, Antonio Tajani, also replied to Becerra stating that, "any action against the Constitution of a Member State is an action against the legal framework of the European Union."

In July 2018, Becerra announced the publication of her book Eres liberal y no lo sabes (You are Liberal and You Don't Know It), scheduled for September of that year, which she described as "a manifesto for an inclusive liberalism, free of dogmatism and modernity."
