= Carpio =

Carpio (Latin for "carp") may refer to:

== Places ==
- Becerril del Carpio, an urban village in Alar del Rey, Palencia, Castilla-Leon, Spain
- Carpio, North Dakota, a city in Ward County, North Dakota, USA
- Carpio de Azaba, a municipality in Salamanca, Spain
- Cosamaloapan de Carpio, a municipality in Veracruz, Mexico
- Diego del Carpio, a municipality located in the province of Ávila, Castile and León, Spain
- El Carpio, Valladolid, a village in Valladolid province, Spain
- El Carpio, a city in Córdoba, Spain
- El Carpio de Tajo, a village in Toledo, Spain
- Santa Cruz Venta de Carpio, an urban village in San Cristóbal Ecatepec, Ecatepec de Morelos, Mexico

== Fish ==
- Carpiodes carpio, the river carpsucker
- Cyprinus carpio, the common carp or European carp
- Salmo carpio (carpione del Garda), a salmonid fish

== People ==
Carpio may refer to a holder of the title Marquess of Carpio

Carpio is a surname in the Spanish language. Notable people of this surname are:

- Alfredo Arce Carpio, Bolivian politician, legal figure, and intellectual
- Ana Carpio, Spanish mathematician
- Antonio Carpio, Filipino jurist
- Armando Carpio Sanchez, Filipino engineer and politician
- Bernardo Carpio, Philippine legendary hero named after the Spanish Bernardo del Carpio
- Bernardo del Carpio, legendary hero of medieval Spanish legend
- Cayetano Carpio, Salvadoran activist, founder of the FMLN
- Conchita Carpio-Morales, Filipino jurist
- Daniela Carpio, Guatemalan-Swiss singer-songwriter, musician, artist, director and producer
- Eduardo Manuitt Carpio, (born 1950), Venezuelan politician
- Esteban Carpio, American murder suspect
- Félix Lope de Vega Carpio, full name of Lope de Vega, Spanish playwright, poet, and novelist
- Franco Carpio, Peruvian politician
- Javier Carpio, Spanish football player
- Jesus Antonio Carpio, Filipino lawyer, journalist, educator, author, and army officer
- Jorge Carpio Nicolle, assassinated Guatemalan politician
- José Carpio (born 1966), Ecuadorian football referee
- Luis Enrique Carpio, Peruvian politician
- Luzmila Carpio, Bolivian chanteuse and diplomat
- Mans Carpio, Filipino lawyer, husband of Sara
- Manuel Carpio, Mexican poet
- Mark Anthony Carpio, Philippine choral conductor
- Miguel Malvar y Carpio, Filipino general who served during the Philippine Revolution the Philippine–American War.
- Rafael Carpio, Mexican sports shooter
- Ramiro de León Carpio, President of Guatemala
- Roberto Carpio, Vice President of Guatemala
- Rita Carpio, Hong Kong pop singer
- Rustica Carpio, Filipino actress
- Sara Duterte-Carpio, Vice President of the Philippines
- Teresa Carpio, Hong Kong singer and actress
- T. V. Carpio, American actress and singer

== See also ==
- Carpi (surname)
- Carpino
- Carpino (surname)
