= Cabinet of Hugo Chávez =

Hugo Chávez served as president of Venezuela from 14 April 2002 until his death on 5 March 2013.

== Cabinet ==
Year	1999				2000				2001				2002				2003				2004				2005				2006				2007				2008				2009				2010				2011				2012				2013
Period	1T	2T	3T	4T	1T	2T	3T	4T	1T	2T	3T	4T	1T	2T	3T	4T	1T	2T	3T	4T	1T	2T	3T	4T	1T	2T	3T	4T	1T	2T	3T	4T	1T	2T	3T	4T	1T	2T	3T	4T	1T	2T	3T	4T	1T	2T	3T	4T	1T	2T	3T	4T	1T	2T	3T	4T	1T
Office of the President		Alfredo Peña	Francisco Rangel				Elías Jaua				Diosdado Cabello		Rafael Vargas Medina				Carlos Eduardo Martínez Mendoza			Adán Chávez		Rodrigo Chaves	Manuel Barroso	Luis Torcatt			Haiman el Troudi			Delcy Rodríguez		Adán Chávez	Hugo Cabezas			Érika Farías	Jesse Chacón			Héctor Rodríguez	Reyes Reyes					Isis Ochoa	María Godoy	Francisco Ameliach			Érika Farías					Carmen Meléndez
Social Participation and Protection																												Jorge García Carneiro					David Velásquez				Érika Farías
Communes and Social Protection																														Érika Farías					Isis Ochoa
People's Economy																								Elías Jaua						Oly Millán		Pedro Morejón
Basic Industries and Mining																									Víctor Álvarez							José Khan					Rodolfo Sanz									José Khan
Science, Technology and Intermediate Industries				Carlos Genatios									Nelson Merentes						Marlene Yadira Córdova														Héctor Navarro						Nuris Orihuela			Jesse Chacón			Ricardo Menéndez
Science and Technology																									Jorge Arreaza
Industries																									Ricardo Menéndez
Telecommunications and IT																												Jesse Chacón				Socorro Hernández
Production and Trade		Gustavo Márquez		J. J. Montilla				Luisa Romero					Adina Bastidas		Ramón Rosales					Wilmar Castro					Edmée Betancourt					María Cristina Iglesias							William Contreras					Eduardo Samán				Richard Canán				Edmée Betancourt
Tourism																									Wilmar Castro								Olga Titina Azuaje									Pedro Morejón				Alejandro Fleming
Agriculture and Lands		Alejandro Riera	J. J. Montilla										Efrén Andrade							Arnoldo Márquez					Antonio Albarrán					Elías Jaua																	Juan Carlos Loyo							Elías Jaua		Juan Carlos Loyo
Sport																							Eduardo Álvarez				Victoria Mata										Héctor Rodríguez
Educación		Héctor Navarro											Aristóbulo Istúriz																				Adán Chávez						Héctor Navarro								Jennifer Gil			Maryann Hanson
Higher Education													Héctor Navarro											Fabio Quijada	Samuel Moncada								Luis Acuña													Edgardo Ramírez				Yadira Córdova
Culture																										Francisco Sesto													Héctor Soto							Francisco Sesto					Pedro Calzadilla
Women and Gender Equality																										María León									Nancy Pérez
Health		Gilberto Rodríguez Ochoa								María Lourdes Urbaneja										Roger Capella					Francisco Armada								Erick Rodríguez		Jesús Mantilla									Carlos Rotondaro		Reyes Reyes	María Eugenia Sader
Housing and Habitat																								Julio Montes				Luis Figueroa			Ramón Carrizalez						Jorge Pérez	Edith Gómez	Francisco Sesto								Ricardo Molina
Public Works and Housing		Reyes Reyes	Julio Montes		Alberto Esqueda					Liliana Verenzuela							Diosdado Cabello					Ramón Carrizalez									José David Cabello							Isidro Rondón			Diosdado Cabello
Transport and Communications																																Francisco Garcés
Ground Transportation																																Juan García Toussaintt
Air and Water Transport																																Elsa Gutiérrez
Communication and Information																Nora Uribe			Jesse Chacón					Andrés Izarra				Yuri Pimentel		Willian Lara							Andrés Izarra				Jesse Chacón		Blanca Eekhout			Tania Díaz	Mauricio Rodríguez		Andrés Izarra							Ernesto Villegas
Interior and Justice		Luis Miquilena		Ignacio Arcaya		Luis Dávila				Luis Miquilena			Rodríguez Chacín	Diosdado Cabello			Lucas Rincón							Jesse Chacón									Pedro Carreño				Rodríguez Chacín			Tarek El Aissami																Néstor Luis Reverol
Defense		Raúl Salazar				Liliana Verenzuela				José Vicente Rangel				Lucas Rincón	José Luis Prieto						Jorge García Carneiro						Orlando Maniglia				Raúl Isaías Baduel					Gustavo Rangel Briceño						Ramón Carrizales				Mata Figueroa								Henry Rangel Silva		Molero Bellavia
Foreign Affairs		José Vicente Rangel								Luis Alfonso Dávila|Luis Dávila					Roy Chaderton							Jesús Arnaldo Pérez|Jesús Pérez			Alí Rodríguez Araque							Nicolás Maduro																				Elías Jaua
Oil and Mining		Alí Rodríguez Araque							Álvaro Silva Calderón							Rafael Ramírez
Electric Energy																																	Ángel Rodríguez		Alí Rodríguez Araque								Héctor Navarro
Economy and Finance		Maritza Izaguirre	José Rojas									Nelson Merentes	Francisco Uson	Tobías Nóbrega											Nelson Merentes								Rodrigo Cabezas				Rafael Isea		Alí Rodríguez Araque
Financing Endogenous Development																	Nelson Merentes
Planning and Finance																																	Jorge Giordani
Planning and Development		Jorge Giordani												Felipe Pérez					Jorge Giordani																		Haiman el Troudi					Jorge Giordani
Labour and Social Security		Leopoldo Puchi	Lino Martínez					Blancanieves Portocarrero					María Cristina Iglesias																	Ricardo Dorado			José Ramón Rivero						Roberto Hernández			María Cristina Iglesias
Environment		Atala Uriana	Jesús Pérez					Ana Elisa Osorio																		Jacqueline Faría							Yubiri Ortega													Alejandro Hitcher										Francisco Ortíz
Food																								Rafael Oropeza						Érika Farías				Rafael Oropeza			Félix Osorio Guzmán											Carlos Osorio
Indigenous Peoples																												Nicia Maldonado																					Aloha Núñez
Youth																												Mary Pili Hernández
Correctional Service																												Iris Varela

== See also ==
- Cabinet of Venezuela
- Cabinet of Juan Guaidó, rival cabinet in opposition to Maduro's cabinet between 2019 and 2023
