= III National Assembly of Venezuela =

Legislative period in Venezuela

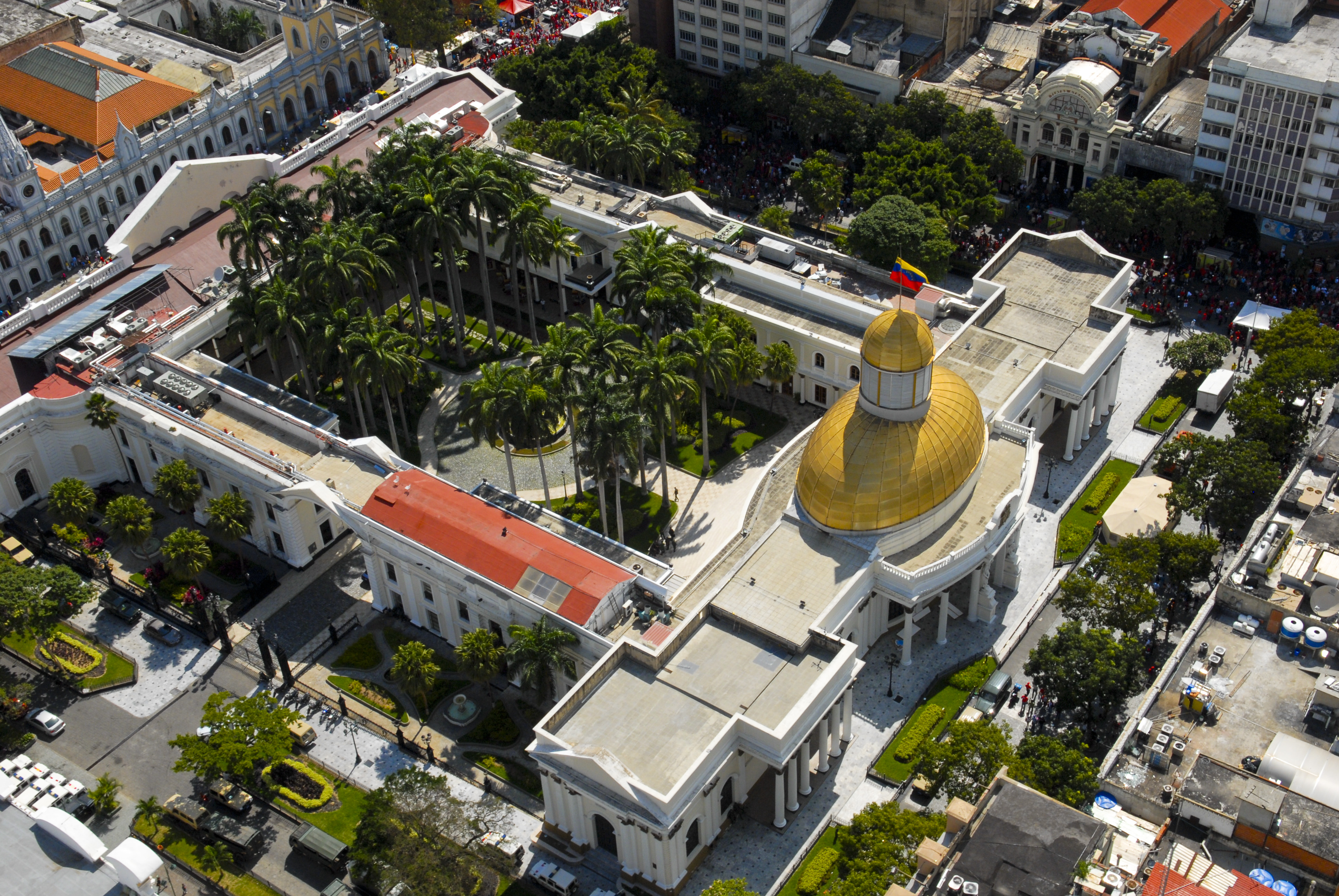
National Assembly of Venezuela

The III National Assembly of Venezuela was a meeting of the legislative branch of Venezuelan federal government, comprising the National Assembly of Venezuela. It met in Caracas after 2010 Venezuelan parliamentary election.

2010 Venezuelan parliamentary election results: Gran Polo Patriótico (GPP) Mesa de la Unidad Democrática (MUD) Patria Para Todos (PPT)

== Major events ==
- Crisis in Venezuela
  - 2014 Venezuelan protests

== Leadership ==
No.	Portrait	Name	Term of Office		State	Legislature	Party
5		Fernando Soto Rojas	5 January 2011	5 January 2012	Falcón	3rd	United Socialist Party(GPP)
6		Diosdado Cabello	5 January 2012	5 January 2016	Monagas	3rd	United Socialist Party(GPP)

== Color codes ==
Democratic Unity Roundtable/Anti-Chavism/Opposition
Chavismo/Great Patriotic Pole/Pro-government

== Members ==
Nº	Representative	State	Party	Former party	Alternate Representative
1	César Sanguinetti	Amazonas	PSUV		(PSUV) José Gregorio Díaz
2	Earle Herrera	Anzoátegui	PSUV		(PCV) Diluvina Cabello
3	Cristóbal Jiménez	Apure	PSUV		(PSUV) Aníbal Espejo
4	Héctor Orlando Zambrano	Apure	PSUV		(PSUV) Carmen Mileydis Fuentes
5	Juan García	Apure	PSUV		(PSUV) Rafael Delgado
6	Jhonny Gonzáles Salguero	Apure	PSUV		(PSUV) Wilfredo Gonzales
7	María León	Aragua	PSUV		(PCV) Douglas Gómez
8	Rosa León	Aragua	PSUV		(PSUV) Willians León
9	José Gregorio Hernández	Aragua	PSUV		(PSUV) Hugo Sosa
10	Betty Croquer	Aragua	PSUV		Vacant
11	Elvis Amoroso	Aragua	PSUV		Vacant
12	Geovanni Peña	Barinas	PSUV		(PSUV) Ana Morales
13	Jesús Graterol	Barinas	PSUV		(PSUV) Ysmelda Montilla
14	Eduardo Lima	Barinas	PSUV		(PSUV) Keissy Gómez
15	Zulay Martínez	Barinas	PSUV		(PSUV) Elena Mora
16	Rosalba Vivas	Barinas	PSUV		Vacant
17	Victoria Mata	Bolívar	PSUV		(PSUV) José Ramón Rivero
18	Adel El Zabayar	Bolívar	PSUV		Vacant
19	Tito Oviedo	Bolívar	PSUV		(PSUV) Alejandro Valdez
20	Richard Rosa	Bolívar	PSUV		(PSUV) Yumelis Viloria
21	Nancy Ascencio	Bolívar	PSUV		Vacant
22	Liris Sol Velásquez	Bolívar	PSUV		(PSUV) Argenis Moreno
23	Lesbia Castillo	Carabobo	PSUV		(PCV) Eduardo Linarez
24	Miriam Pérez	Carabobo	PSUV		(PSUV) Xiomara Luna
25	Héctor Agüero	Carabobo	PSUV		Vacant
26	José Ávila	Carabobo	PSUV		(PSUV) Thaer Hasan
27	Saúl Ortega	Carabobo	PSUV		(PSUV) Dheliz Álvarez
28	Asdrubal Colina	Carabobo	PSUV		(PSUV) Yonder Silva
29	Loidy Herrera	Cojedes	PSUV		(PSUV) Hayden Pirela
30	Alejandro Villanueva	Cojedes	PSUV		(PSUV) Jackson Páez
31	Henry Hernández	Delta Amacuro	PSUV		(PSUV) Lorenzo Devera
32	Carlos Gómez	Delta Amacuro	PSUV		Vacant
33	Alfredo Rojas	Delta Amacuro	PSUV		(PSUV) Jesús Jiménez
34	Loa Tamaronis	Delta Amacuro	PSUV		(PSUV) Narciso Mata
35	Tania Díaz	Distrito Capital	PSUV		Vacant
36	Eduardo Piñate	Distrito Capital	PSUV		Vacant
37	Freddy Bernal	Distrito Capital	PSUV		(PSUV) Dessiré Santos Amaral
38	Juan Bautista Contreras	Distrito Capital	PSUV		Vacant
39	Jesús Faría	Distrito Capital	PSUV		(PSUV) Ziomara Lucena
40	Darío Vivas	Distrito Capital	PSUV		(PSUV) Antonieta de Stefano
41	Juan Carlos Alemán	Distrito Capital	PSUV		(PSUV) Carlos Sierra
42	Fernando Soto Rojas	Falcón	PSUV		(PSUV) Aleydys «La Chiche» Manaure
43	Alexis Rodríguez	Falcón	PSUV		Vacant
44	Jesús Montilla	Falcón	PSUV		(PSUV) Ramón Mora
45	Henry Ventura	Falcón	PSUV		Vacant
46	Jesús Cepeda	Guárico	PSUV		(PSUV) Dilia Mejías
47	Róger Cordero Lara	Guárico	PSUV		(PSUV) Juan Marín
48	José Alfredo Ureña	Guárico	PSUV		(PSUV) Nidia Loreto
49	Pedro Carreño	Lara	PSUV		(PSUV) José Zerpa
50	Alexander Torrealba	Lara	PSUV		(PSUV) Leobardo Acurero
51	Francisco Martínez	Lara	PSUV		(PSUV) Linda Amaro
52	Isabel Lameda	Lara	PSUV		(PSUV) Honorio Dudamel
53	Julio Chávez	Lara	PSUV		(PSUV) Germán Ferrer
54	Alexander Dudamel	Lara	PSUV		(PSUV) Miguel Valecillos
55	Diógenes Andrade	Mérida	PSUV		(PSUV) Carmen Urdaneta
56	Mary Mora	Mérida	PSUV		Vacant
57	Ramón Lobo	Mérida	PSUV		(PSUV) Antonio Santiago
58	Guido Ochoa	Mérida	PSUV		(PSUV) Gabriel Hernández
59	Luis Camargo	Miranda	PSUV		(PCV) José Rivero
60	Juan Soto	Miranda	PSUV		(PSUV) Augusto Montiel
61	Marleny Contreras	Miranda	PSUV		(PSUV) José Vicente Rangel Ávalos
62	Modesto Ruíz	Miranda	PSUV		(PSUV) Iroshima Bravo
63	Claudio Farías	Miranda	PSUV		(PSUV) Jesús Gonzáles
64	Elio Serrano	Miranda	PSUV		(PSUV) Carlos Echezuria
65	Diosdado Cabello	Monagas	PSUV		(PSUV) Ricaurte Leonett
66	Orangel López	Monagas	PSUV		(MIGATO) Diego Pérez
67	William Fariñas	Nueva Esparta	PSUV		(PCV) Febres Rodríguez
68	Blanca Eekhout	Portuguesa	PSUV		(PCV) Pedro Eusse
69	Silvio Mora	Portuguesa	PSUV		(PSUV) Iván Abreu
70	Enzo Cavallo Russo	Portuguesa	PSUV		(PSUV) César Molina
71	Nelson Escobar	Portuguesa	PSUV		(PSUV) Willian Pérez
72	César Gonzáles	Portuguesa	PSUV		(PSUV) Francisco Torrealba
73	Amanda Jiménez	Sucre	PSUV		(PCV) Viannora Figueroa
74	Erick Mago	Sucre	PSUV		(PSUV) Luis Napoleón Barrios
75	Algencio Monasterio	Sucre	PSUV		(PSUV) Gloria García
76	Ricardo Sanguino	Táchira	PSUV		(PSUV) José Luis Contreras
77	Manuel Briceño	Trujillo	PSUV		(PSUV) María Noguera
78	Christian Zerpa	Trujillo	PSUV		(PSUV) Edgar Barreto
79	José Morales	Trujillo	PSUV		(PSUV) Oresteres de Leal
80	Hughel Roa	Trujillo	PSUV		(PSUV) Indiana Román
81	Oswaldo Vera	Vargas	PSUV		(PSUV) Simón Escalona
82	Odalis Monzón	Vargas	PSUV		(PSUV) Patricia Toledo
83	Gladys Requena	Vargas	PSUV		(PSUV) Manuel Grillo
84	Braulio Álvarez	Yaracuy	PSUV		(PSUV) Hayde Huérfano
85	Néstor León Heredia	Yaracuy	PSUV		(PSUV) Joel Pineda
86	Yorman Aular	Yaracuy	PSUV		(PSUV) Alexander Rincón
87	Carlos Gamarra	Yaracuy	PSUV		(PSUV) Pompeyo Aguilar
88	Carmen Bohórquez	Zulia	PSUV		(PCV) Gustavo Lara
89	Jhony Bracho	Zulia	PSUV		(PSUV) Danilo Añez
90	Sergio Fuenmayor	Zulia	PSUV		(PSUV) Wilfredo Luzardo
91	Esteban Ramos	Indigenous peoples	PSUV	Connive	(PSUV) Mercedes Maldonado
92	José Luis González	Indigenous peoples	PSUV	Connive	Vacant
93	Jesús Paraqueima	Anzoátegui	PSUV	PODEMOS	(MPJ) Nemesio Villalobos
94	William Ojeda	Miranda	PSUV	UNTC	(MPJ) Rafael Guzmán
95	Carlos Flores	Monagas	PSUV	MIGATO	Vacant
96	Hernán Núñez	Sucre	PSUV	VPA	(AD) José Contreras
97	Yul Jaboul	Cojedes	PCV		(PSUV) Alí Alberto Flores
98	Oscar Figuera	Guárico	PCV		(PSUV) Lídice Altuve
99	Edgar Lucena	Táchira	PCV		Vacant
1	Carlos Andrés Michelangeli	Anzoátegui	AD		(UNTC) Freddy Curupe
2	Rodolfo Rodríguez	Anzoátegui	AD		(APC) Carlos Vargas
3	Antonio Barreto Sira	Anzoátegui	AD		(MPV) Andrew Espejo
4	Miriam de Montilla	Apure	AD		(Independent) Emma Solorzano
5	Dennis Fernández	Cojedes	AD		(UNTC) Salomón Centeno
6	Elieser Sirit	Falcón	AD		(COPEI) Miguel Ramón Castejón
7	Édgar Zambrano	Lara	AD		(APC) Andrés Avelino Álvarez
8	William Dávila	Mérida	AD		(COPEI) Jesús Alberto Barrios
9	Tobías Bolívar	Nueva Esparta	AD		(MPJ) Buelvas Tamburini
10	César Rincones	Sucre	AD		(UNTC) José Noriega
11	Leomagno Flores	Táchira	AD		(MAS) Walter Márquez
12	Bernardo Guerra	Vargas	AD		(Voluntad Popular) Juan Guaidó
13	Hernán Alemán	Zulia	AD		(AD) Gualberto Mas y Rubí Peña
1	Stalin González	Distrito Capital	UNTC		(Independent) Juan de Dios Rivas
2	Carlos Ramos Rivas	Mérida	UNTC		(AD) Freddy Marcano
3	Orlando Ávila	Nueva Esparta	UNTC		(MAS) Luis Longart
4	Enrique Catalán	Trujillo	UNTC		(AD) Carmen Méndez
5	Omar Barboza	Zulia	UNTC		(AD) Liz María Márquez
6	Enrique Márquez	Zulia	UNTC		(UNTC) Heliodoro Quintero
7	Alfredo Osorio	Zulia	UNTC		(COPEI) Rogelio Boscán
8	Juan Romero	Zulia	UNTC		(AD) Ely Ramón Atencio
9	William Barrientos	Zulia	UNTC		(UNTC) Edwin Luzardo
10	José Sánchez «Mazuco» Montiel	Zulia	UNTC		(UNTC) Nora Bracho
11	Freddy Paz	Zulia	UNTC		(UNTC) Mavaline Baudino
12	Elías Matta	Zulia	UNTC		(UNTC) Víctor Ruz
1	Richard Arteaga	Anzoátegui	MPJ		(LA CAUSA R) Luis Mata
2	Dinorah Figuera	Distrito Capital	MPJ		(ABP) «La Negra» Rosaura Sanz
3	Julio Borges	Miranda	MPJ		(COPEI) Roberto Enriquez
4	Juan Carlos Caldera	Miranda	MPJ		(AP) José Antonio España
5	Tomás Guanipa	Zulia	MPJ		(UNTC) Anaydee Morales
6	Ismael García	Aragua	MPJ	AP	(AD) Margarita Rivero
7	Gregorio Graterol	Falcón	MPJ	Independent	(COPEI) Moraima Galicia
8	Hermes García	Sucre	MPJ	AP	(MPJ) Juan Pablo Patiño
9	Arcadio Montiel	Indigenous peoples	MPJ	MIA-Zulia	(Independent) Jairo Silva
1	Luis Barragan	Aragua	COPEI		Vacant
2	Enrique Mendoza	Miranda	COPEI		(AD) Ángel Medina
3	Gabino Paz	Táchira	COPEI		(AP) Miguel Pizarro
4	Jesús Abelardo Díaz	Táchira	COPEI		(COPEI) Norman Labrador
5	Homero Ruíz	Táchira	COPEI		(AD) Ana Haydée Useche
6	Jacinto Romero Luna	Anzoátegui	COPEI	JRL	(Independent) Juan de Sousa
7	Morel Rodríguez	Nueva Esparta	COPEI	AD	(Independent) Héctor Mata
1	Carlos Berrizbeitia	Carabobo	PRVZL		(AD) Manuel Román
2	Deyalitza Aray	Carabobo	PRVZL		(PRVZL) Eduardo Pino
3	Vestalia Sampedro de Araujo	Carabobo	PRVZL		(PRVZL) Belkis Ramos
1	Andrés Velásquez	Bolívar	LA CAUSA R		(AD) Freddy Valera
2	Américo de Grazia	Bolívar	LA CAUSA R		(COPEI) Manuel de González
3	Alfredo Ramos	Lara	LA CAUSA R		(UNTC) Guillermo Palacios
1	Julio Haron Ygarza	Amazonas	MPV	PPT	(MPV) Stephen Alassad
2	Nirma Guarulla	Amazonas	MPV	PPT	(MPV) Lizett Fernández
1	Julio César Reyes	Barinas	AP	GE	(AD) Andrés Eloy Camejo
1	Richard Blanco	Distrito Capital	ABP		(AD) Oscar Ronderos
1	Biagio Pilieri	Yaracuy	CONVERGENCIA		(CONVERGENCIA) Juan José Caldera
1	José Manuel González	Guárico	Independent		(AD) Carlos Prosperi
2	Eduardo Gómez Sigala	Lara	Independent		(MPJ) Alejandro Romero
3	Miguel Ángel Rodríguez	Táchira	Independent		(COPEI) Eduardo Marín
4	Marcos Figueroa	Anzoátegui	Independent	DALE	(Independent) Jesús González
5	Francisco Javier Soteldo	Carabobo	Independent	MPJ	Vacant
6	Juan García	Monagas	Independent	AD	(AD) Wilfredo Febres
7	Iván Colmenares	Portuguesa	Independent	MAS	(COPEI) Pedro Pablo Fernández
8	Hiran Gaviria	Aragua	Independent	UNTC	(PRVZL) José Hernández
9	Alfonso Marquina	Miranda	Independent	UNTC	(MPJ) Fernando Peña
10	Julio Montoya	Zulia	Independent	UNTC	(UNTC) Gustavo Fernández
1	Jesús Enrique Domínguez	Monagas	MIGATO	PSUV	(MIGATO) Patricia Martín
2	Nelson Rodríguez Parra	Monagas	MIGATO	PSUV	(PSUV) César Gutiérrez
1	Ricardo Sánchez Mujica	Miranda	APC	Independent	Vacant

=== Representatives per state ===
Federal Entity		Representatives	Map
	Amazonas	3	
	Anzoátegui	8	
	Apure	5	
	Aragua	8	
	Barinas	6	
	Bolívar	8	
	Carabobo	10	
	Cojedes	4	
	Delta Amacuro	4	
	Dependencias Federales	-	
	Distrito Capital	10	
	Falcón	6	
	Guárico	5	
	Lara	9	
	Mérida	6	
	Miranda	12	
	Monagas	6	
	Nueva Esparta	4	
	Portuguesa	6	
	Sucre	6	
	Táchira	7	
	Trujillo	5	
	Vargas	4	
	Yaracuy	5	
	Zulia	15	
Bandera de Venezuela.	Indigenous Representation Western, Eastern and Southern Regions	3	
Bandera de Venezuela.	Venezuela	165	

== See also ==
- I National Assembly of Venezuela
- II National Assembly of Venezuela
- IV National Assembly of Venezuela
- V National Assembly of Venezuela
- VI National Assembly of Venezuela
