= I National Assembly of Venezuela =

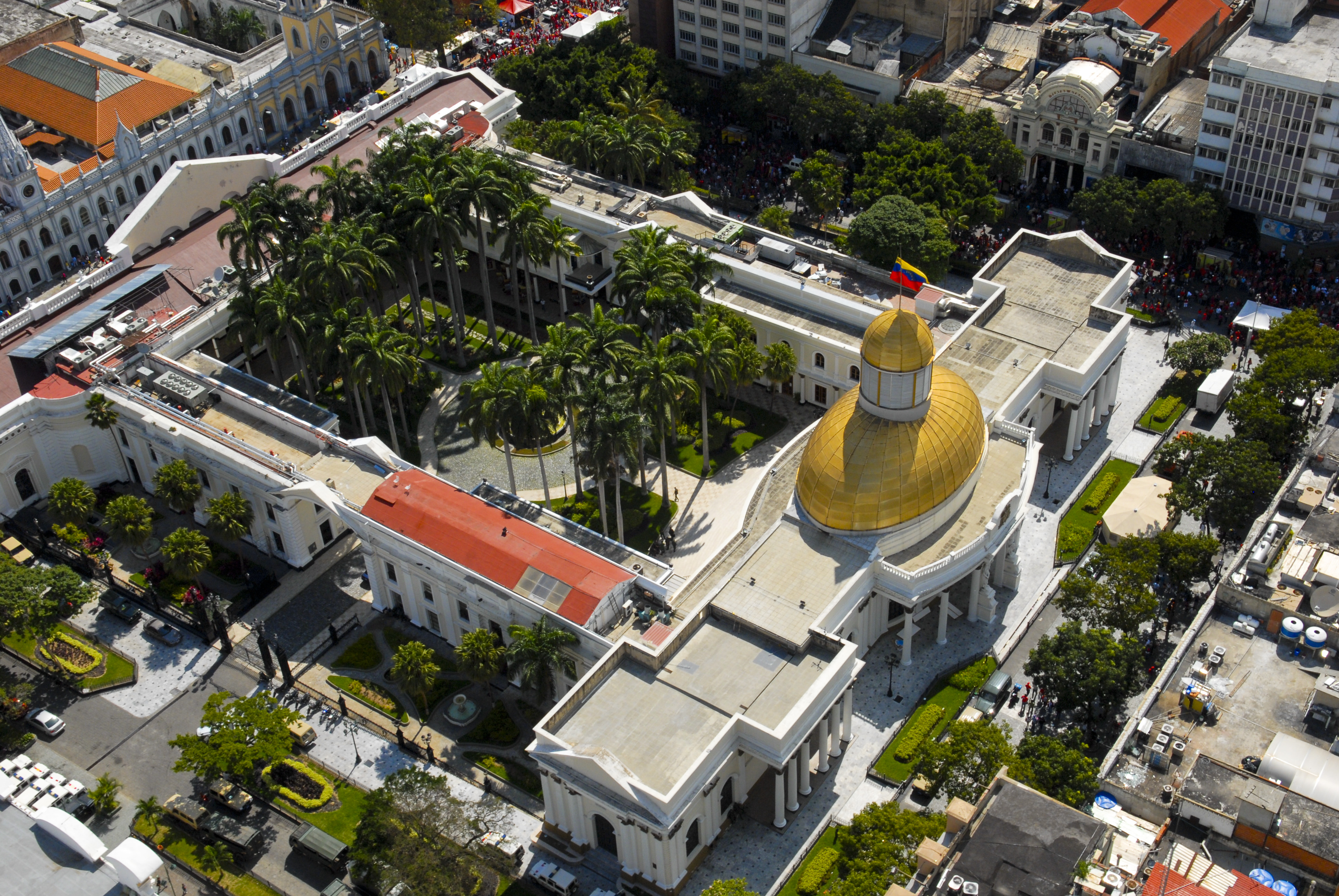
National Assembly of Venezuela

The I National Assembly of Venezuela was a meeting of the legislative branch of Venezuelan federal government, comprising the National Assembly of Venezuela. It met in Caracas after 2000 Venezuelan parliamentary election.

== Leadership ==
No.	Portrait	Name	Term of Office		State	Legislature	Party
1		Willian Lara	10 August 2000	5 January 2003	Guárico	1st	Fifth Republic Movement
2		Francisco Ameliach	5 January 2003	5 January 2005	Carabobo	1st	Fifth Republic Movement

== Color codes ==
Coordinadora Democrática/Anti-Chavism/Opposition
Chavismo/Fifth Republic Movement/Pro-government

== Members ==
N.º	Representative	State	Party
1	Adel Samara El Zabayar	Bolívar	MVR
2	Amalia Rosa Sánquiz de Sáez	Lara	MVR
3	Ángel Landaeta	Guárico	MVR
4	Ángel Gamboa	Anzoátegui	MVR
5	Asdrúbal Salazar	Cojedes	MVR
6	Briccio Urdaneta	Lara	MVR
7	Calixto Ortega	Zulia	MVR
8	Willian Lara	Miranda	MVR
9	Carlos Espinoza	Apure	MVR
10	Cilia Adela Flores	Distrito Capital	MVR
11	Ramón Darío Vivas	Distrito Capital	MVR
12	Desireé Santos	Distrito Capital	MVR
13	Edis Alfonso Ríos	Zulia	MVR
14	Elvis Amoroso	Aragua	MVR
15	Eduardo Arónica	Anzoátegui	MVR
16	Fahd El Gatrif	Apure	MVR
17	Francisco Solórzano	Anzoátegui	MVR
18	Haydeé Machín	Miranda	MVR
19	Ibraín Velásquez	Nueva Esparta	MVR
20	Imad Saab Saab	Zulia	MVR
21	Jacinto Martinez	Sucre	MVR
22	Jesús Santiago De León	Barinas	MVR
23	José Khan	Distrito Capital	MVR
24	José Sanguino	Portuguesa	MVR
25	José Ricardo Cárdenas	Táchira	MVR
26	Juan José Jover	Trujillo	MVR
27	Julio Fernando García	Táchira	MVR
28	Julio Bernardo Moreno	Trujillo	MVR
29	Luis Acuña	Sucre	MVR
30	Luis Tascón	Táchira	MVR
31	Marelis Marcano	Monagas	MVR
32	María Milagros Santana	Zulia	MVR
33	María Iris Varela	Táchira	MVR
34	Maris Eizaga	Falcón	MVR
35	Miguel Rojas	Guárico	MVR
36	Orlando García	Carabobo	MVR
37	Orlando Rivero	Apure	MVR
38	Osmar Gómez	Carabobo	MVR
39	Pastor González	Lara	MVR
40	Pedro Bastidas	Aragua	MVR
41	Pedro Carreño	Barinas	MVR
42	Rafael Ríos	Bolívar	MVR
43	Raúl Esté	Miranda	MVR
44	Roberto Quintero	Zulia	MVR
45	Rodolfo Gutiérrez	Carabobo	MVR
46	Rodrigo Cabezas	Zulia	MVR
47	Simón Escalona	Vargas	MVR
48	Tania D'Amelio	Vargas	MVR
49	Tulio Jiménez	Miranda	MVR
50	Víctor Morales	Miranda	MVR
51	Victoria Mata	Bolívar	MVR
52	Virgilio Chávez	Falcón	MVR
53	William García	Carabobo	MVR
54	Francisco Ameliach	Carabobo	MVR
55	Nicolás Maduro	Distrito Capital	MVR
56	Félix Leonett	Miranda	MVR
57	Manuel Carmona	Nueva Esparta	MVR
58	Carlos Colina	Bolívar	MVR
59	Néstor León Heredia	Yaracuy	MVR
60	Óscar Francisco Pérez	Trujillo	MVR
61	Elis Omaña	Mérida	MVR
62	Henry Baldayo	Falcón	MVR
63	Eddy Gómez	Aragua	MVR
64	Flor Ríos	Distrito Capital	MVR
65	Henry Tachinamo	Anzoátegui	MVR
66	Juan Carlos Dugarte	Distrito Capital	MVR
67	Jesús Alberto García	Mérida	MVR
68	Berkis Solís de Sorrentino	Bolívar	MVR
69	Saúl Ortega	Carabobo	MVR
1	Ismael García	Aragua	Podemos
2	Pedro Jiménez	Monagas	Podemos
3	Ricardo Gutiérrez	Portuguesa	Podemos
4	Hector Vargas	Zulia	Podemos
5	Malarquías Gil	Trujillo	Podemos
1	Pedro Solano	Guárico	PPT
2	Ramón Acosta	Falcón	PPT
3	Manuel Villalba	Monagas	PPT
1	Guillermo Guevara	Región Occidente	Conive
2	José Luis González	Región Occidente	Conive
3	Noelí Pocaterra	Región Occidente	Conive
82	César López Bernabé	Amazonas	Puama
83	Henry Hernández	Delta Amacuro	UPV
73	Denis Peraza	Lara	Arebrecha
84	Ángel Graterol	Portuguesa	Oire
85	Ismael Burgos	Lara	Arpa
86	Luis D'Angelo	Falcón	SF
1	Alfonso Marquina	Sucre	AD
2	Ángel González	Apure	AD
3	Benita Araujo	Mérida	AD
4	César Rincones	Sucre	AD
5	Ramón Pérez Briceño	Trujillo	AD
6	Dellis Campos	Bolívar	AD
7	Dianela Parra	Zulia	AD
8	Héctor Gaester	Portuguesa	AD
9	Héctor Larreal	Aragua	AD
10	Isabel del Carmen Calderón	Amazonas	AD
11	Jesús Garrido	Barinas	AD
12	Joffre Navas	Barinas	AD
13	Luis Berdugo	Apure	AD
14	Luis Carlos Padilla	Anzoátegui	AD
15	Néstor López	Mérida	AD
16	Norberto Peña	Monagas	AD
17	Pastor Heydra	Nueva Esparta	AD
18	Pedro Pablo Alcántara	Lara	AD
19	Salomón Centeno	Cojedes	AD
20	Wilfredo Febres	Monagas	AD
21	Edgar Zambrano	Lara	AD
22	Henry Ramos Allup	Distrito Capital	AD
23	Rafael Marín	Guárico	AD
1	Leopoldo Puchi	Aragua	MAS
2	Jesús Odúber	Mérida	MAS
3	Carlos Santafé	Carabobo	MAS
4	Carlos Tablante	Aragua	MAS
5	Felipe Mujica	Anzoátegui	MAS
6	Idelfonso Sosa	Cojedes	MAS
7	José Salazar	Delta Amacuro	MAS
8	Julio Montoya	Zulia	MAS
9	Luis Longart	Nueva Esparta	MAS
10	Nelson Rampersad	Bolívar	MAS
11	Pedro Castillo	Vargas	MAS
1	Carlos Berrizbeitia	Sucre	PRVZL
2	Danilo Pérez	Lara	PRVZL
3	Gerardo Saer	Carabobo	PRVZL
4	Pedro Díaz Blum	Carabobo	PRVZL
5	Vestalia Sampedro de Araujo	Carabobo	PRVZL
6	Víctor León	Carabobo	PRVZL
7	Ezequiel Vivas	Aragua	PRVZL
1	Abel Oropeza	Falcón	COPEI
2	Miguel Moyetones	Guárico	COPEI
3	Nélson Chacín	Táchira	COPEI
4	Víctor Cedeño	Delta Amacuro	COPEI
5	Edgar Mora	Mérida	COPEI
6	César Pérez Vivas	Táchira	COPEI
1	Carlos Ocariz	Miranda	MPJ
2	Gerardo Blyde	Miranda	MPJ
3	Julio Borges	Miranda	MPJ
4	Ramón Medina	Miranda	MPJ
5	Liliana Hernández	Distrito Capital	MPJ
1	Ángel Vera	Zulia	UNT
2	Jesús Alcántara	Zulia	UNT
3	Charles Medina	Zulia	UNT
4	Omar Fuenmayor	Zulia	UNT
1	Alejandro Arzola	Yaracuy	Convergencia
2	Iván Mastrangello	Yaracuy	Convergencia
3	Juan José Caldera	Yaracuy	Convergencia
4	Miguel Ángel Adames	Yaracuy	Convergencia
1	Andrés Velásquez	Anzoátegui	LCR
2	Elías Matta	Zulia	LCR
3	Enrique Márquez	Zulia	LCR
1	Nélson Ventura	Amazonas	Solidaridad
2	Ernesto Alvarenga	Distrito Capital	Solidaridad
3	José Luis Farías	Vargas	Solidaridad
1	Carlos Tamayo	Portuguesa	CP
2	Leopoldo Martínez Nucete	Miranda	CP
1	Ángel Jordan	Aragua	Transparencia
1	Aníbal Jiménez	Cojedes	PD
2	Carlos Casanova	Táchira	PD
3	Freddy Lepage	Miranda	PD
4	Luis Beltrán	Bolívar	PD
5	Pedro Blanco	Sucre	PD
1	Rafael Jiménez	Barinas	OFM
2	Guillermo Palacios	Lara	OFM
3	Luis Salas	Miranda	OFM
1	Rafael Rivero	Portuguesa	Independent
2	Róger Rondón	Delta Amacuro	Independent

== See also ==
- II National Assembly of Venezuela
- III National Assembly of Venezuela
- IV National Assembly of Venezuela
- V National Assembly of Venezuela
- VI National Assembly of Venezuela
