= Héctor Rodríguez Castro =

Venezuelan politician and lawyer

Héctor Rodríguez
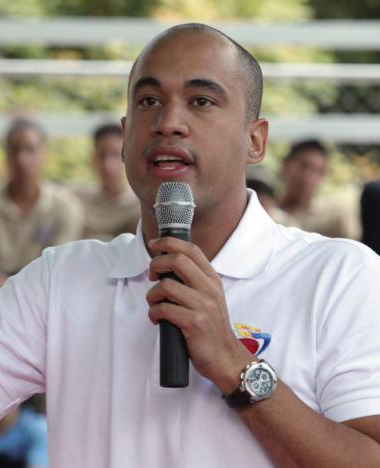

Minister of Education
- Incumbent
- Assumed office 27 August 2024
- President: Nicolás Maduro; Delcy Rodríguez (acting)
- Preceded by: Yelitze Santaella
- In office 9 January 2014 – 4 September 2015
- Preceded by: Maryann Hanson
- Succeeded by: Rudolfo Pérez

Governor of Miranda
- In office 18 October 2017 – 10 September 2024
- Preceded by: Henrique Capriles
- Succeeded by: Elio Serrano

Deputy of the National Assembly of Venezuela
- In office 5 January 2016 – 30 July 2017
- Constituency: Bolívar State

Minister of Youth
- In office 21 April 2013 – 9 January 2014
- President: Nicolás Maduro
- Preceded by: Mari Pili Hernández
- Succeeded by: Víctor Clark

Minister of Sport
- In office 22 June 2010 – 21 April 2013
- President: Hugo Chávez; Nicolás Maduro
- Preceded by: Victoria Mata
- Succeeded by: Alejandra Benítez

Personal details
- Born: 26 March 1982 (age 44) Río Chico, Miranda, Venezuela
- Party: United Socialist Party of Venezuela
- Education: Central University of Venezuela

Héctor Rodríguez Castro (born March 26, 1982) is a Venezuelan lawyer and politician. He is currently the national Minister of Education in the cabinet of Delcy Rodríguez.

== Early life ==
Castro was born in Río Chico, Venezuela on March 26, 1982.

== Political career ==
On 9 January 2014, he was appointed as Minister of Popular Power for Education until his dismissal on 4 September 2015 to be a candidate for deputy to the National Assembly of Venezuela. He was elected deputy list by the Bolívar state for the period 2016–2021 in the parliamentary elections of 6 December 2015 by the Great Patriotic Pole. He won the regional elections in Miranda in 2017. Earlier that year, he was elected as a member of the National Assembly of Venezuela in the state of Miranda.

== Personal life ==
Castro is married and has two sons.
