= SAIME =

Venezuelan government institution

Administrative Service of Identification, Migration and Foreigners
Government agency overview
- Formed: December 31, 1941; 84 years ago as the Central Identification Office
- Preceding Government agency: National Office of Identification and Foreigners (ONIDEX)
- Jurisdiction: National
- Headquarters: Caracas, Distrito Capital
- Government agency executive: Director
- Parent Government agency: Ministry of Interior, Justice and Peace
- Website: http://www.saime.gob.ve/ (in Spanish)

SAIME (formerly ONIDEX) is a Venezuelan government institution, traditionally in charge of Civil registry services. The name derives from the Spanish acronym for Servicio Administrativo de Identificación, Migración y Extranjería (Administrative Service of Identification, Migration and Foreigners). The function of this government office is to issue passports, identity cards for immigrants, and other legal nationality documents for Venezuelan citizens and residents. Currently, the director of the institution is Gustavo Vizcaino.

== History ==
On 8 February 2017, a joint CNN and CNN en Español year-long investigation called "Passports in the Shadows" (Spanish: Pasaportes en la sombra) - based on the information provided by a whistleblower and subsequent investigations, reported that employees of the Venezuelan embassy in Baghdad, Iraq has been selling passports and visas to persons from Middle Eastern countries (specifically Syria, Palestine, Iran, Iraq and Pakistan) with dubious backgrounds for profits. The SAIME confirmed the sold passports' genuineness as each passport came with an assigned national identification number, although the names of the individuals were altered when checking against the national database. At least one individual's place of birth was also changed from Iraq to Venezuela. According to Misael López Soto, a former employee at the Venezuelan embassy in Iraq who was also a lawyer and CICPC officer, the Bolivarian government would sell authentic passports to individuals from the Middle East, with the Venezuelan passport able to access 130 countries throughout the world without a visa requirement. López provided CNN documents showing how his superiors attempted to cover up the sale of passports, which were being sold from $5,000 to $15,000 per passport. López Soto fled the Venezuelan embassy in Iraq in 2015 to meet with the FBI in Spain, with a Venezuelan official who assisted him to fly out of the country being killed the same day. The investigation also found that between 2008 and 2012, Aragua Governor Tareck El Aissami ordered for hundreds of Middle Eastern individuals to obtain illegal passports, including members of Hezbollah.

The Venezuelan foreign minister, Delcy Rodríguez, denied the government's involvement when questioned by the reporters during the Seventy-first session of the United Nations General Assembly and accused the network of performing what she described as an "imperialistic media operation" against Venezuela for airing the investigation. On 14 February 2017, Venezuelan authorities ceased the broadcasting of CNN en Español two days after the Venezuelan president, Nicolás Maduro, ordered CNN to "(get) well away from here".

The government deemed the report "(A threat to) the peace and democratic stability of our Venezuelan people since they generate an environment of intolerance." Venezuelan National Commission of Telecommunications director Andrés Eloy Méndez accused CNN en Español of instigating religious, racial and political hatred, violence and other themes.
