= Carpinoni =

Carpinoni is an Italian surname. Notable people with the surname include:

- Domenico Carpinoni (1566–1658), Italian painter of the Renaissance period
- Marziale Carpinoni (c. 1644–1722), Italian painter of the Baroque period.

== See also ==
- Carpini (disambiguation)
- Carpino (surname)
