= Ministry of Education (Venezuela) =

Government ministry of Venezuela

The Venezuelan Ministry of Popular Power for Education (Spanish: Ministerio del Poder Popular para la Educación, MPPE) is the federal-level department responsible for organising the education system of Venezuela. In 2001 it was the Ministry of Education, Sport and Culture, with responsibility for Culture and Sport being assigned to separate ministries on 14 February 2005 and 6 January 2007.

== Administration ==
The Ministry itself has four sub-departments, each overseeing different areas of education. They are the Department of Primary and Secondary Education, the Department of Higher Education and Research, the Department of Special Programs in Education, and the Department of Administration and Service. The Ministry maintains strict control over the curriculum, meaning it is almost identical at every level across the country in all institutions; in 2009, even more curriculum control was given to a council that is run as part of the United Socialist Party of Venezuela, which prompted protests.

There are two education laws in the country, the 1940 Ley de Educación and the 1980 Ley Orgánica de Educación. In 1969 the government also adopted decrees 120 and 136, with plans to reform the general education curriculum. Since the entrance of the Chávez government, early-education reform took place to introduce "Bolivarian schools" that teach students up to the age of 14 in line with the principles of Bolivarianism and emphasize serving the country.

There has been debate in the university community over curriculum reforms at this level; though university management staff agree that new laws may be needed to address deficits in teaching 21st-century information, they fear that any attempts to push reform through a Chavist government will take away what little autonomy they have from the powers many universities in the country reject.

Since 1976, the Ministry has run the country's Open University to provide distance learning for adults.

=== Ministers ===
Ministros de Educación de Venezuela
Order	Name	Period	President
1	Anibal Dominici	1881 - 1887	Antonio Guzmán Blanco
2	José María Ortega Martínez	1887 - 1888	Hermógenes López
3	Manuel Clemente Urbaneja	1899 - 1900	Cipriano Castro
4	Félix Quintero	1900 - 1901	Cipriano Castro
5	Tomás Garbiras	1901 - 1902	Cipriano Castro
6	Rafael Monserrate	1902 - 1903	Cipriano Castro
7	Eduardo Blanco	1903 - 1905; 1906	Cipriano Castro
8	Arnaldo Morales	1905 - 1906	Cipriano Castro
9	Enrique Siso	1906	Cipriano Castro
10	Carlos León	1906	Cipriano Castro
11	Laureano Villanueva	1906 - 1907	Cipriano Castro
12	José Antonio Baldó	1907 - 1908	Cipriano Castro
13	Trino Baptista	1910	Cipriano Castro
14	Rafael González Rincones	1917 - 1922; 1931 - 1936	Juan Vicente Gómez; Eleazar López Contreras
15	José Ramón Ayala	1936	Eleazar López Contreras
16	Caracciolo Parra Pérez	1936	Eleazar López Contreras
17	Rómulo Gallegos	1936	Eleazar López Contreras
18	Alberto Smith	1936 - 1937	Eleazar López Contreras
19	Rafael Ernesto López	1937 - 1938	Eleazar López Contreras
20	Enrique Tejera Guevara	1938 - 1939	Eleazar López Contreras
21	Arturo Uslar Pietri	1939 - 1941	Eleazar López Contreras
22	Alejandro Fuenmayor	1941	Isaías Medina Angarita
23	Gustavo Herrera	1941 - 1943	Isaías Medina Angarita
24	Rafael Vegas	1943 - 1945	Isaías Medina Angarita
25	Humberto García Arocha	1945 - 1946	Rómulo Betancourt
26	Antonio Anzola Carrillo	1946 - 1947	Rómulo Betancourt
27	Luis Beltrán Prieto Figueroa	1947 - 1948; 1948	Rómulo Betancourt; Rómulo Gallegos
28	Simón Becerra	1952 - 1953	Marcos Pérez Jiménez
29	José Loreto Arismendi	1953 - 1956	Marcos Pérez Jiménez
30	Darío Parra	1956 - 1958	Marcos Pérez Jiménez
31	Néstor Prato Chacón	1958	Marcos Pérez Jiménez
32	Humberto Fernández Morán	1958	Marcos Pérez Jiménez
33	Rafael Pizani	1959 - 1960	Rómulo Betancourt
34	Martín Pérez Guevara	1960 - 1961	Rómulo Betancourt
35	Reinaldo Leandro Mora	1961 - 1964	Rómulo Betancourt
36	José Manuel Siso Martínez	1964 - 1969	Raúl Leoni
37	Héctor Hernández Carabaño	1969 - 1971	Rafael Caldera
38	Enrique Pérez Olivares	1971 - 1974	Rafael Caldera
39	Luis Manuel Peñalver	1974 - 1977	Carlos Andrés Pérez
40	Carlos Rafael Silva	1977 - 1979	Carlos Andrés Pérez
41	Gerardo Cedeño Fermín	1979	Carlos Andrés Pérez
42	Rafael Fernández Heres	1979 - 1982	Luis Herrera Campins
43	Felipe Montilla	1982 - 1984	Luis Herrera Campins
44	Ruth Lerner de Almea	1984 - 1985	Jaime Lusinchi
45	Luis Manuel Carbonell Parra	1985 - 1987	Jaime Lusinchi
46	Pedro Cabello Poleo	1987 - 1988	Jaime Lusinchi
47	Laura Castillo de Gurfinkel	1988 - 1989	Jaime Lusinchi
48	Gustavo Roosen	1989 - 1992	Carlos Andrés Pérez
49	Pedro Augusto Beauphertuy	1992 - 1993	Carlos Andrés Pérez
50	Elizabeth Yabour de Caldera	1993 - 1994	Ramón José Velasquez
51	Antonio Luis Cárdenas	1994 - 1999	Rafael Caldera
52	Héctor Navarro	1999 - 2001	Hugo Chávez
53	Aristóbulo Istúriz	2001 - 2007	Hugo Chávez
54	Adán Chávez	2007 - 2008	Hugo Chávez
55	Héctor Navarro	2008 - 2010	Hugo Chávez
56	Jennifer Gil	2010 - 2011	Hugo Chávez
57	Maryann Hanson	2011 - 2013	Hugo Chávez
58	Héctor Rodríguez Castro	2013 - 2015	Nicolás Maduro
59	Rodulfo Pérez Hernández	2015 - 2017	Nicolás Maduro
60	Elías Jaua	2017 - 2018	Nicolás Maduro
61	Aristóbulo Istúriz	2018–2021	Nicolás Maduro
62	Eduardo Piñate	2021	Nicolás Maduro
63	Yelitze Santaella	2021–2024	Nicolás Maduro
64	Héctor Rodríguez Castro	2024–2025	Nicolás Maduro
65	Héctor Rodríguez Castro	2025–	Nicolás Maduro

== Financing ==
The Ministry is in charge of all education funding in Venezuela from a budget provided entirely by the government, and subsequently how it is spent. This budget is typically about 15% of the entire government budget, and of this, higher education has the largest share, usually about a third of the whole Education budget.

=== Pre-school and primary education ===
State-funded preschools are free to attend, but are underfunded; private alternatives have taken over at this level of education. As preschool is not compulsory in Venezuela, many of those who do attend are enrolled at the private schools and as such are from wealthier backgrounds. Primary schools are compulsory, and see good attendance, though more in urban areas than in rural. No matter their public or private status, all schools in Venezuela are under the oversight of the Ministry.

=== Secondary education ===
Private education is particularly popular at the secondary education level. The Bolivarian missions launched in 2003 were also seen as a success for providing outreach to improve literacy and university opportunities in rural areas.

=== Higher education ===
Universities have a certain level of autonomy and are allowed to receive funds from other sources, including private donations and from their research (e.g. patents) and other marketable pursuits, as long as this does not exceed the funding received from the Ministry. The ultimate responsibility for the management of the university also belongs to the Ministry, so universities cannot be independent from government control and the Minister for Education is able to take charge of all university activities if it deems necessary, including curriculum, research, policy, and the university management itself.

Higher education facilities and individual students in Venezuela may also receive recurrent funding from the private sector for the establishment of scholarships or fellowships.

In the 1970s, a program called the Gran Mariscal de Ayacucho Foundation (Fundayacucho) was started by the government to encourage external training in subjects for necessary vocations, sending many students to Spain, the United States, and the United Kingdom. However, while tuition was paid for by the government at the foreign institution, no employment support was given in Venezuela, resulting in many of the students returning or staying in the countries they had been sent to. This also led to a shortage of trained professionals in the areas that were planned to improve the country. In the 21st century, Fundayacucho has instead become a government loan provider for students, but still provides loan forgiveness if students maintain a certain GPA.

In 2012, the Ministry of Higher Education introduced currency controls on students, only allowing university students with approved permission to seek education or training abroad in certain specific degrees to exchange currency. None of these degree pathways are humanities or social sciences, and biology is not included, either.

=== Research ===
The standard of research in Venezuela has been described as "generally weak", with the system said to "not foster a research environment" at all.

Institutions at large cannot maintain research projects due to a lack of modern facilities, and those who leave the country for education tend to remain abroad to conduct research. Academics who used to work in Venezuela have also left the country in a brain drain that has particularly affected the sciences because of the lack of funding given in Venezuela.

The government also sponsors CONICIT (National Science Council), which provides highly competitive funding for any kind of research or further training and education.

According to the World Education Review, in 2013 there were more Venezuelan scientists working in the US alone than in Venezuela, by 150%.

== See also ==
- Education in Venezuela
