= Manuel Núñez Tovar =

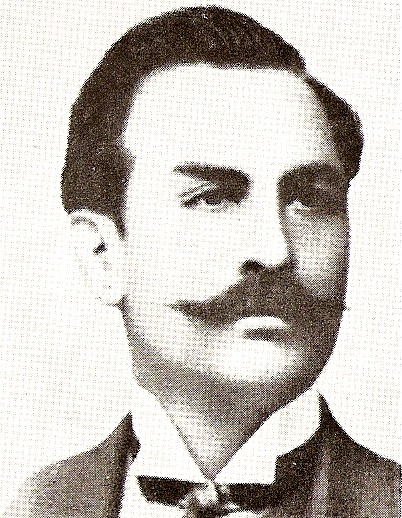
- Manuel Nunez Tovar
- Born: 24 September 1872; Caicara de Maturín, Monagas State,
- Died: 27 January 1928 (aged 51); Maracay, Aragua State
- Education: Central University of Venezuela
- Scientific career
- Fields: Medicine, Entomology

Manuel Nuñez Tovar (Caicara de Maturín, Monagas, 24 September 1872 – Maracay, Aragua, 27 January 1928) was a Venezuelan naturalist, researcher, parasitologist and entomologist. For his work in the latter discipline, he is considered to be the "first Venezuelan entomologist."

== Biography ==
Nuñez Tovar began his studies at Caicara and later continued in Maturin, where he graduated from high school at age 16. The first two years he studied medicine at the Federal College of Barcelona and finished the course at the Central University of Venezuela in 1895.

After graduating returned to Monagas state, where he practised and worked as a doctor of health in 1908. In 1909, with Cesar Flamerich and Rafael Nuñez Isava, he was part of the Public Health Commission, and that same year began his studies in entomology. In this discipline, he studied the importance of insects in the transmission of disease, was the author of numerous papers, and identified Necator americanus as the cause of anaemia in patients who had suffered from malaria.

After twenty years in Monagas state, Núñez Tovar lived temporarily in Caracas and La Victoria, settling permanently in Maracay after being appointed to the medical brigade in the garrison of the city. During this time he collected many animal species in the valleys of Aragua and around the Lake Valencia. Nuñez never left Venezuela, but scientists visited the country to personally meet the author of a voluminous body of scientific work, including the discovery of several species of mosquitoes that carry his name.

For his scientific work, a high school and University Hospital of Maturin were named in his honour, and his entomology collection was acquired by the government of Venezuela. This is preserved in the Department of Malariology and Environmental Sanitation, Ministry of Health of Maracay. The mosquito Anopheles nuneztovari and the sandfly Pintomyia nuneztovari were named to honor his contributions to entomological science.

== Works ==
- Índice dipterológico de Venezuela: con la distribución geográfica por estados. Caracas: Litografía y Tipografía El Comercio, 1924.
- Insectos venezolanos transmisores de enfermedades. Caracas: Litografía del Comercio, 1921.
- Mosquitos y flebotomos de Venezuela. Caracas: Litografía y Tipografía del Comercio, 1924.
