= Pintomyia nuneztovari =

Scientific classification
- Kingdom: Animalia
- Phylum: Arthropoda
- Class: Insecta
- Order: Diptera
- Family: Psychodidae
- Genus: Pintomyia
- Subgenus: Pifanomyia
- Species: P. nuneztovari

Binomial name
- Pintomyia nuneztovari Ortíz, 1954

Species of fly

Pintomyia nuneztovari is a phlebotomous sand fly in the subgenus Pifanomyia native to South America. It was named by the entomologist who first described the species in the scientific literature, Venezuelan entomologist Ignacio Ortíz, to honor the scientific contributions of Manuel Núñez Tovar.

== Distribution ==
Pintomyia nuneztovari occurs in Bolivia, Colombia, Guatemala, Honduras, Panama, Peru, and Venezuela.

== Bionomics ==
Pintomyia nuneztovari has been found to readily bite humans indoors between 11:00 p.m. and 6:00 a.m.

== Medical Importance ==
Genus Leishmania trypanosomes, responsible for the disease leishmaniasis, have been reported in Pin. nuneztovari from Bolivia.
