= Haifa El Aissami =

Venezuelan lawyer

- Born: Haifa El Aissami Maddah; April 5, 1971 (age 54); El Vigía, Venezuela
- Relatives: Tareck El Aissami (brother)

Haifa El Aissami Maddah (5 April 1971) is a Venezuelan lawyer. In the 1980s, she was involved in investigating extrajudicial killings in Venezuela. In 2010, controversially, she became her country's ambassador to the Netherlands, and in 2016 she was appointed as the ambassador to the International Criminal Court.

== Biography ==
She was a prosecutor with national jurisdiction in the Public Ministry of Venezuela, where she led the investigations of the Yumare massacre in 1986 and the El Amparo massacre in 1988. She also stood out in the indictment and sentencing of Iván Simonovis, Lázaro Forero and Henry Vivas, police officers accused of ordering the shooting of demonstrators in downtown Caracas during the Llaguno Overpass events on 11 April 2002, during which an opposition march demanded the resignation of President Hugo Chávez.

In 2010 she was appointed as Venezuela's ambassador to the Netherlands in the Venezuelan Official Gazette No. 39.565. Since she had no diplomatic experience, this appointment generated criticism and accusations of nepotism, being the sister of interior affairs minister Tareck El Aissami. On 7 January 2016, in Official Gazette No. 40,823, she was appointed as ambassador permanent representative of the Venezuelan mission to the International Criminal Court, to the Organization for the Prohibition of Chemical Weapons and to other international organizations and tribunals in the Netherlands.

After the announcement by the International Criminal Court on the opening of a preliminary examination of Venezuela for the investigation of crimes against humanity, Attorney General in exile Luisa Ortega Díaz announced in February 2018 that she would request the expulsion of El Aissami as the ambassador to The Hague because "she has become a disruptive element in the ICC investigations against Venezuelan officials."

In 2021 she was appointed by Nicolás Maduro as permanent representative of Venezuela to the Food and Agriculture Organization of the United Nations (FAO). Following the arrest of her brother Tareck El Aissami on April 09, 2024, it remains unknown if his arrest has effected her career within the government.

== Personal life ==
Haifa is the sister of Tareck El Aissami, a high ranking government official that has held positions such as interior affairs minister and Vice President. Their father's origins go back to Syria and their mother's origins go back to Lebanon, and they belong to the Druze community.

== See also ==
- International Criminal Court investigation in Venezuela
