= Rafael Isea =

Venezuelan politician

58th Governor of Aragua
- In office 2008–2012
- Preceded by: Didalco Bolívar
- Succeeded by: Tarek El Aissami

Personal details
- Born: February 18, 1968 (age 58) Maracay
- Party: United Socialist Party of Venezuela (PSUV)
- Profession: Politician

Rafael Eduardo Isea Romero (born 18 February 1968, Maracay) is a Venezuelan politician, and Governor of Aragua State from 2008 to 2012. A graduate of the Venezuelan Military Academy (1989), he participated in Hugo Chávez' February 1992 Venezuelan coup d'état attempt.

From 2001 to 2004 he was Venezuela's representative to the Inter-American Development Bank. In the 2005 parliamentary elections he was elected to the National Assembly of Venezuela. In 2007 he was named deputy Minister of Finance, and in 2008, Minister of Finance of Venezuela, before being elected Governor of Aragua in the 2008 regional elections, beating PODEMOS' Henry Rosales.

Rafael Isea lives in the United States with his wife and children. He works as an Amazon courier.
