= Liz María Márquez =

Venezuelan politician

Liz María Márquez Socorro is a Venezuelan politician, currently an alternate deputy of the National Assembly for the Zulia state.

== Career ==
Márquez was elected as alternate deputy for the National Assembly for the Zulia state for the 2016–2021 term in the 2015 parliamentary elections, representing the Democratic Unity Roundtable (MUD) opposition coalition. She has been the alternate deputy for Omar Barboza, for whom she has also been alternate for the 2011–2016 legislative period. In the 2021 municipal elections, she was nominated as candidate for mayor of the Machiques de Perijá municipality in the state.

== See also ==
- III National Assembly of Venezuela
- IV National Assembly of Venezuela
