= List of governors of Guárico =

Coat of arms of Guárico state

This is a list of governors of the Venezuelan Guárico State:

Until 1989, they were appointed by the president of Venezuela. Starting from that year they are elected in universal, direct and secret elections. In some years the head of Guárico state was known as President or Civil and Military Chief, in others Governor.

#	Name	Party	Term
1	Manuel Sarmiento	N/A	1909
2	Roberto Vargas	N/A	1909
3	Alejandro Landaeta	N/A	1909–1910
4	David Gimon	N/A	1910
5	J.A Hernandez Ron	N/A	1910–1913
6	David Gimon	N/A	1913
7	Alejandro Landaeta	N/A	1913
8	J.A Hernandez Ron	N/A	1913–1914
9	Leon Jurado	N/A	1914–1915
10	Pedro M. Guerra	N/A	1915
11	Manuel Sarmiento	N/A	1915–1924
12	Leon Jurado	N/A	1924–1925
13	A. Rodriguez Lopez	N/A	1925–1929
14	Juan A. Ramirez	N/A	1929–1934
15	Ignacio Andrade	N/A	1934–1936
16	Guillermo Barreto M.	N/A	1936
17	Ovidio Perez	N/A	1936
18	Rafael Zamora Arevalo	N/A	1936–1937
19	Emilio Arevalo Cedeño	N/A	1937–1938
20	Pedro Rodriguez Berrueta	N/A	1938–1939
21	Eduardo Morales	N/A	1939
22	Rafael Zamora Arevalo	N/A	1939–1940
23	Pedro Rodriguez Berrueta	N/A	1940–1942
24	Julio Montenegro	N/A	1942–1943
25	Pedro Sotillo	Accion Democratica	1943–1945
26	Manuel Gimon Itriago	N/A	1945
27	Ricardo Montilla	N/A	1945–1947
28	Miguel Toro Alayon	N/A	1947–1948
29	Rafael Zamora Perez	N/A	1948–1949
30	Rafael E. Garron G.	N/A	1949–1952
31	Emigdio Medina Ron	N/A	1952–1957
32	Roberto Casanova	N/A	1957–1958
33	Luis Morales Padilla	N/A	1958–1959
34	Juan Manuel Barrios	Accion Democratica	1959–1963
35	Ricardo Montilla	Accion Democratica	1963–1964
36	Ruben Hurtado Rodriguez	Accion Democratica	1964–1965
37	Alberto Bustamante	Accion Democratica	1965–1966
38	Hector Carpio Castillo	Accion Democratica	1966–1967
39	Daniel Corado Belisario	Accion Democratica	1967–1968
40	Fernando Alvarado G.	Accion Democratica	1968–1969
41	Jose I. Gonzalez Aragot	COPEI	1969–1970
42	Victor Rubin Zamora	COPEI	1970
43	David Itriago Sifontes	COPEI	1970–1972
44	Alejandro Rodriguez G.	COPEI	1972–1974
45	Maximo Salazar	Accion Democratica	1974
46	Pedro Pablo Cabrera	Accion Democratica	1974–1975
47	Jose I. Diaz Milano	Accion Democratica	1975–1978
48	Jose Angel Hernandez	Accion Democratica	1978–1979
49	Facundo Camero V.	COPEI	1979–1980
50	Jose Rodriguez Saez	COPEI	1980–1983
51	Miguel Aguilar C.	COPEI	1983–1984
52	Rafael Ledezma	Accion Democratica	1984–1985
53	Modesto Freites Piñate	Accion Democratica	1985–1987
54	Nery Celestino Parra	Accion Democratica	1987–1988
55	Angel Vicente Andrade	Accion Democratica	1988–1989
56	Alberto Diaz Heredia	Accion Democratica	1989–1990
57	Rafael Tobias Delgado	Accion Democratica	1990
58	Modesto Freites Piñate	Accion Democratica	1990–1993
59	Jose A. Malave Risso	COPEI	1993–1996
60	Rafael Emilio Silveira	Accion Democratica	1996–1999
61	Eduardo Manuitt Carpio	Patria Para Todos	1999–2008
62	Willian Lara	PSUV	2008–2010
63	Luis Enrique Gallardo	PSUV	2010–2012
64	Ramón Rodríguez Chacín	PSUV	2012–2017
65	José Manuel Vásquez	PSUV	2017–2025
66	Donald Donaire	GPPSB	2025–2029

== Elected governors ==
Took office	Left office	Governor	Vote
1989	1992	Modesto Freites Piñate, Democratic Action	52.24
1992	1995	José A. Malavé Risso, COPEI	45.25
1995	1998	Rafael Emilio Silveira, Democratic Action	46.69
1998	2000	Eduardo Manuitt Carpio, PPT	48.01
2000	2004	Eduardo Manuitt Carpio, PPT	48.10
2004	2008	Eduardo Manuitt Carpio, PPT	78.46
2008	2010	Willia Lara†, PSUV	52.08
2010	2012	Luis Enrique Gallardo, PSUV	77.09
2012	2017	Ramón Rodríguez Chacín, PSUV	74.70
2017	2025	José Manuel Vásquez, PSUV	61,77
2025	2029	Donald Donaire, GPPSB	93.15 %

† = Died in office.

== See also ==
- List of Venezuela governors
- Politics of Venezuela
- History of Venezuela
