= Cedeño Municipality, Monagas =

Cedeño Municipality Municipio Cedeño
- Municipality
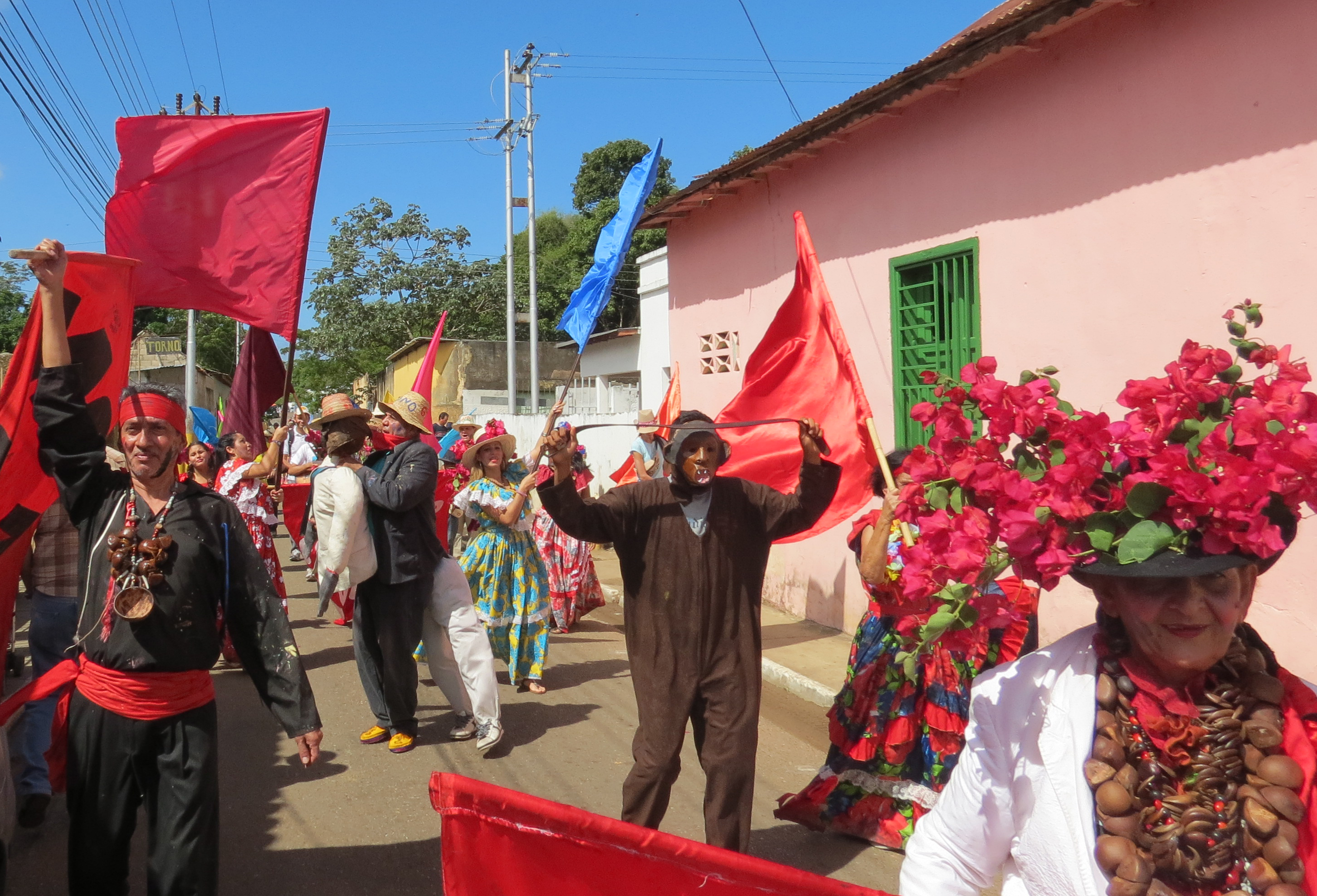

- Flag

- Location in Monagas

- Location in Venezuela
- Coordinates: 9°51′33″N 63°44′48″W
- Country: Venezuela
- State: Monagas
- Municipal seat: Caicara de Maturín

Government
  - Mayor: Daniel Monteverde (PSUV)

Area
  - Total: 2,077.2 km^{2} (802.0 sq mi)

Population (2001)
  - Total: 27,894
  - Density: 13.429/km^{2} (34.780/sq mi)
- Time zone: UTC−4 (VET)

Cedeño is one of the thirteen municipalities of the state of Monagas in Venezuela. It is located in the northwest of the state.

== Important urban centers ==
- Areo
- Caicara de Maturín
- San Félix de Cantalicio

== Economy ==
Agriculture is the main economic activity. Sweet paprika, cotton, beans, maize, potatoes, watermelons, tomatoes and soja are some of the most important products.

The municipality has an agro-industrial complex where Juana Rámirez corn flour is produced.

== Politics and government ==
=== Mayors ===
- Pedro Briceño. (2004 - 2008), (2008 - 2013) PSUV.
- Wilma Carvajal. (2013 - 2017) PSUV.
