= Andrés Izarra =

Venezuelan politician

Andrés Izarra (born 26 May 1969 in Caracas, Venezuela) is a Venezuelan politician, journalist and former Minister of Tourism of the Bolivarian Republic of Venezuela. Previously, he held various positions in the media area and in Venezuelan politics, mainly during the government of President Hugo Chávez.

== Early life ==
Izarra is the son of the retired Venezuelan Army colonel, William Izarra. Unlike his father, Andrés Izarra was not linked to politics from the beginning: in the beginning he worked as a journalist in different places. He worked in Germany and France, and later worked in Mexico and the United States on the news networks NBC and CNN. In 1999, he returned to Venezuela where he served as production manager for the Venezuelan company RCTV. In April 2002 citing ethical conflicts with the news channel he resigned, which made him better known among government supporters. In 2003 he returned to work for the American company CNN.

In 2003, he was appointed press attaché of the Venezuelan embassy in Washington. In 2004, he was appointed Minister of Communication and Information of Venezuela. From the ministry he promoted pending reforms, by improving the Venezuelan State Television Channel, and promoted the Law on Social Responsibility on Radio and Television (Ley Resorte, called "Gag Law" by the sectors adverse to the government, under the argument that it forced the media to incur in the censorship of their contents for political reasons). This was criticized by the Human Rights Watch.

Izarra was a minister until 2005, when he was appointed director of the multi-state network TeleSUR. That same year, he married Isabel González Capriles, a television presenter and journalist for Globovisión.

In January 2008, Izarra was again appointed Minister of Communication, replacing journalist Willian Lara. In December 2008 he was replaced in office by Jesse Chacón Escamillo. On April 21, 2013, Izarra was appointed Minister of Tourism for the Government of Nicolás Maduro.

In 2018 he asked for a change of government, thus separating himself from the ranks of the ruling party.
