= Luis Manuel Carbonell Parra =

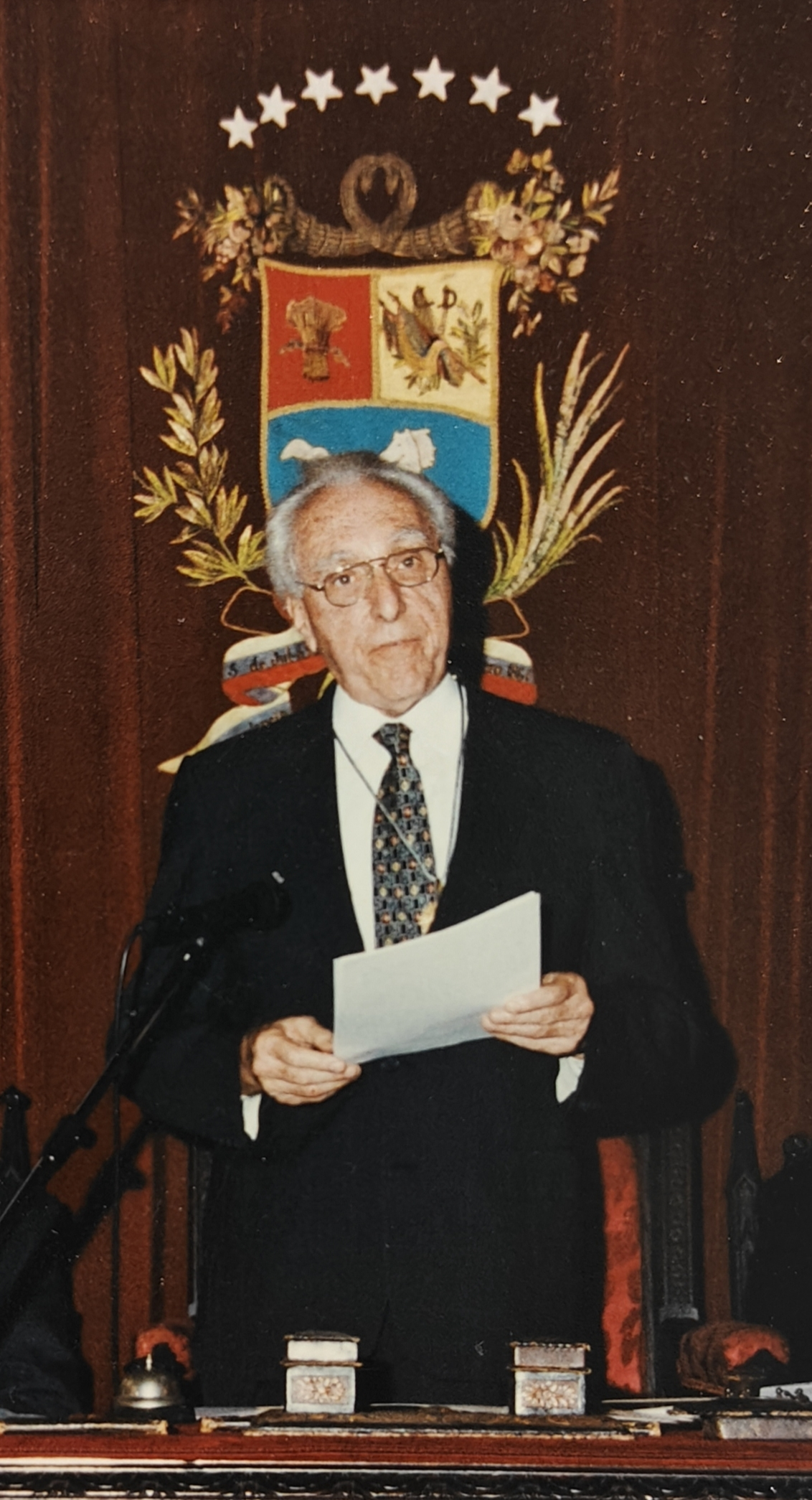

Minister of Education of Venezuela
- In office 13 March 1985 – 21 April 1987
- President: Jaime Lusinchi
- Preceded by: Ruth Lerner de Almea
- Succeeded by: Pedro Cabello Poleo

Minister of State for Science and Technology of Venezuela
- In office 2 February 1984 – 12 March 1985
- President: Jaime Lusinchi
- Preceded by: Raimundo Villegas
- Succeeded by: Tulio Arends

Personal details
- Born: December 29, 1924 Caracas, Venezuela
- Died: November 19, 2015 (aged 90) Caracas, Venezuela
- Spouse: Julieta Salas
- Children: Luis Federico, Pedro Enrique, Julio Manuel Carbonell
- Education: Central University of Venezuela
- Occupation: Physician, Explorer, Politician

Luis Manuel Carbonell Parra (Caracas, December 29, 1924 – Caracas, November 19, 2015) was a Venezuelan scientist, researcher, and university professor.

== Biography ==
He obtained his degree as a medical surgeon in 1948 and specialized in Anatomical Pathology in 1950 at the Central University of Venezuela. He was a pioneer in Venezuela in research on parasites responsible for Chagas-related myocarditis.

In 1951, he served as chief medical officer on the Franco-Venezuelan expedition led by French explorer Joseph Grelier, which successfully discovered the previously unknown source of the Orinoco River. This significant discovery not only had geographical importance but also provided key information for defining the border between Venezuela and Brazil. Dr. Carbonell Parra’s medical contribution was essential for ensuring the safety and success of the expedition under particularly challenging jungle conditions.

He served as a pathologist at Hospital Vargas and Maternidad Concepción Palacios, both in Caracas, between 1945 and 1956. He was an assistant professor of neuroanatomy at Howard, George Washington, and the Armed Forces Institute of Pathology in Washington D.C., between 1952 and 1955.

Upon returning to Venezuela, he devoted himself entirely to research . Alongside his colleague Marcel Roche, his name became closely associated with the history and development of the Venezuelan Institute for Scientific Research (IVIC), an institute he helped reorganize since its inception in 1959 and collaborated with as a lead researcher, deputy director (1959-1969), and later director (1974-1981). Academically, he was a full professor of anatomical pathology at his alma mater between 1958 and 1963 and participated in committees for creating the Simón Bolívar University and the Faculty of Sciences of the University of the Andes, both in 1969.

He was a numbered member of the Venezuelan Academy of Physical, Mathematical and Natural Sciences (Seat XXX), serving as president from 2003 to 2008. Since 2019, the Academy annually awards the "Luis y Juli Carbonell" Prize, honoring the contributions of Dr. Luis Manuel Carbonell Parra and his wife, Julieta Salas de Carbonell. This prestigious prize recognizes Venezuelan scientists or research groups who have significantly advanced knowledge or developed projects addressing critical environmental conservation issues, biodiversity protection, and sustainable development in Venezuela.

He was also Minister of State for Science and Technology (1984), Minister of Education (1985), President of the Foundation "Centro de Investigaciones del Estado para la Producción Experimental Agroindustrial" (CIEPE) (1974), President of the National Council for Scientific and Technological Research (CONICIT) (1985), and President of the Foundation for the Development of Physical, Mathematical and Natural Sciences (FUDECI) (1996).

He published 52 papers on electron microscopy of human pathogenic fungi and various gastroenterological topics, among his most notable publications was hi co-authoring of the book "The Pathologic Anatomy of Mycoses" in 1971 and was awarded Venezuela's highest honors, including the Order of the Liberator (Knight in 1953 and Band of Honor in 1985), Order of Andrés Bello (Collar Class, 1968, Band of Honor, 1985), Order of Francisco de Miranda, Band of Honor and Second Class, and the Ministry of Education's Public Instruction Medal "Orden 27 de Junio" (1966). He died on November 19, 2015, at the age of 90.

Selected Publications of Luis Manuel Carbonell Parra
Title	Publication	Year	URL	Type
Chemical and immunological properties of galactomannans obtained from Histoplasma	Mycopathologia et mycologia applicata	1974	Link	Article
The Pathologic Anatomy of Mycoses	Handbuch der speziellen pathologischen Anatomie	1971	Link	Book
Glycogen in Yeast Form of Paracoccidioides brasiliensis	Nature	1965	Link	Article
Ultraestructura Del Paracoccidioides Brasiliensis En Cultivos De La Fase Levaduriforme	Mycopathologia et mycologia applicata	1963	Link	Article

== See also ==
- Jaime Lusinchi
- Ministry of Education (Venezuela)
