= Betty Croquer =

Venezuelan politician

National Assembly of Venezuela deputy
- In office 5 January 2011 – 5 January 2016
- Constituency: Aragua state

Personal details
- Party: United Socialist Party of Venezuela (PSUV)
- Occupation: Politician

Betty Croquer is a Venezuelan politician. She was National Assembly deputy for Aragua state and the United Socialist Party of Venezuela (PSUV), where she had been a member of the Standing Committee on Science, Technology and Innovation.

== See also ==
- III National Assembly of Venezuela
