= List of governors of Aragua =

- State coat of arms

- Flag of the State
- Incumbent; Joana Sánchez
- Style: Governor
- Status: Head of State
- Term length: Four years

This is a list of governors of the Venezuelan Aragua State:

Until 1989, they were appointed by the president of Venezuela. Starting from that year they are elected in universal, direct and secret elections.

== Elected governors ==
Took office	Left office	Governor	Vote
1989	1992	Carlos Tablante, MAS	50.51
1992	1995	Carlos Tablante, MAS	62.73
1995	1998	Didalco Bolívar Graterol, MAS	48.93
1998	2000	Didalco Bolívar Graterol, MAS	72.44
2000	2004	Didalco Bolívar Graterol, MAS	84.54
2004	2008	Didalco Bolívar Graterol, PODEMOS	67.70
2008	2012	Rafael Isea, PSUV	58.92
2012	2016	Tareck El Aissami, PSUV	55.56
2017	2017	Caryl Bertho, PSUV	Replacement after El Aissami resigned.
2017	2021	Rodolfo Clemente Marco Torres, PSUV	57,02
2021	2021	Daniela González, PSUV	Replacement after Rodolfo Clemente Marco Torres resigned.
2021	2025	Karina Carpio Bejarano, PSUV	51,60
2025	2029	Joana Sánchez, PSUV	86,92

== See also ==
- List of Venezuela governors
- Politics of Venezuela
- History of Venezuela
