= Esteban Carpio =

American murderer (born 1978)

- Born: July 30, 1978 (age 48); Boston, Massachusetts, U.S.

Esteban Carpio (born July 30, 1978) is an American murderer serving a life sentence without parole for killing a detective during an interrogation at a Providence, Rhode Island, police station in 2005.

== Crime ==
On April 17, 2005, Carpio was detained on suspicion of stabbing 85-year-old Madeline Garth. He was being questioned by Providence Police Detective Sgt. James L. Allen and another detective at Providence Police headquarters. When the second detective left the third-floor interview room to retrieve water for Carpio, a struggle ensued. Carpio shot Allen twice, killing him, then jumped from a third-floor window in an escape attempt.

== Trial, conviction and appeals ==
At his arraignment hearing, Carpio wore a mask due to injuries sustained the previous day. His eyes, cheeks, forehead, and cranial region were red, bruised and swollen. Carpio's family broke down in court and accused the police of brutality. Providence Police Chief Dean M. Esserman said Carpio's injuries were sustained as a result of his jump from the third-floor interview room. Rhode Island State Police detective Christopher Zarrella testified in court he had punched Carpio in self-defense during the arrest, striking Carpio’s face three times. An FBI investigation concluded police did not use excessive force.

On June 27, 2006, a jury found Carpio guilty of the murder of Detective Allen and the stabbing of Madeline Gatta. The jury rejected Carpio's insanity defense; he was sentenced to life in prison without parole.

The state Supreme Court in 2012 denied Carpio’s appeal, saying, in part, that his lawyers had strategically opted not to pursue a new trial.

In 2017, he appealed to a federal judge and argued that the jury wrongfully convicted him, though he lacked criminal responsibility at the time because he was mentally ill and unable to appreciate the wrongfulness of his actions.
