= Didalco Bolívar =

Venezuelan politician

Didalco Antonio Bolívar Graterol

57th Governor of Aragua
- In office 1995–2008
- Preceded by: Carlos Tablante (MAS)
- Succeeded by: Rafael Isea (PSUV)

Personal details
- Party: For Social Democracy
- Profession: Politician

Didalco Bolívar is a Venezuelan politician, and was Governor of Aragua State from 1995 to 2008. His first three election victories (1995, 1998, 2000) were as a representative of the Movement for Socialism. In the 2004 elections he represented For Social Democracy (PODEMOS), a party he co-founded in 2003.

In 2009 he fled to Peru after being charged with corruption allegedly committed while Governor. He was arrested on his return to Venezuela on 31 August 2011, and was released on probation in September. Shortly before his return he claimed that PODEMOS was selling nominations for governorships, and had concluded a $9m deal with a Miami-based businessman associated with the party.

In June 2012 Bolívar was declared provisional president of PODEMOS following a court challenge. Bolívar argued that he had never given up the leadership of PODEMOS, and that the appropriate electoral procedures to replace him had not been followed. One of his first acts was to announce PODEMOS would withdraw from the Socialist International, after the organization had rejected the Supreme Court of Venezuela decision that installed him as provisional president. Another was to declare that PODEMOS would support Chávez' candidacy in the October 2012 elections. He said that 70% of PODEMOS supporters wanted Chávez re-elected.
