= Ana Carpio =

Spanish applied mathematician

Ana María Carpio Rodríguez is a Spanish applied mathematician whose research has included inverse problems, the propagation of dislocations in crystals, fluid dynamics, reaction–diffusion systems, and cancer metastasis. She is a professor of applied mathematics at the Complutense University of Madrid.

== Education and career ==
Carpio studied mathematics and numerical analysis at the University of the Basque Country, earning bachelor's and master's degrees in 1988. Next, she went to Pierre and Marie Curie University in France, where she earned a Diplome d'Etudes Approfondies in 1989. She continued there for a Ph.D. in 1993, directed by Alain Haraux. Her doctoral dissertation there was Etude de quelques problèmes d'équations aux dérivées partielles nonlinéaires, and concerned partial differential equations. In the same year, the Complutense University of Madrid recognized her with a Ph.D., for the same dissertation (in Spanish), listing Enrique Zuazua as her advisor. She completed a Spanish habilitation in 2004.

She was appointed as an assistant professor at the Complutense University of Madrid in 1992, associate professor in 1994, and full professor in 2006. From 1996 to 1997 she traveled to the University of Oxford for postdoctoral research at the Oxford Centre for Industrial and Applied Mathematics. Since 2007 she has also been affiliated with the Gregorio Millán Barbany University Institute for Modelling and Simulation in Fluodynamics, Nanoscience and Industrial Mathematics of Charles III University of Madrid.

== Recognition ==
Carpio was the inaugural winner of the SEMA Young Researcher Award of the Spanish Society of Applied Mathematics, in 1998.
