= El Carpio de Tajo =

Village in Spain

Coordinates: 39°53′N 4°27′W

Coat of arms of El Carpio de Tajo

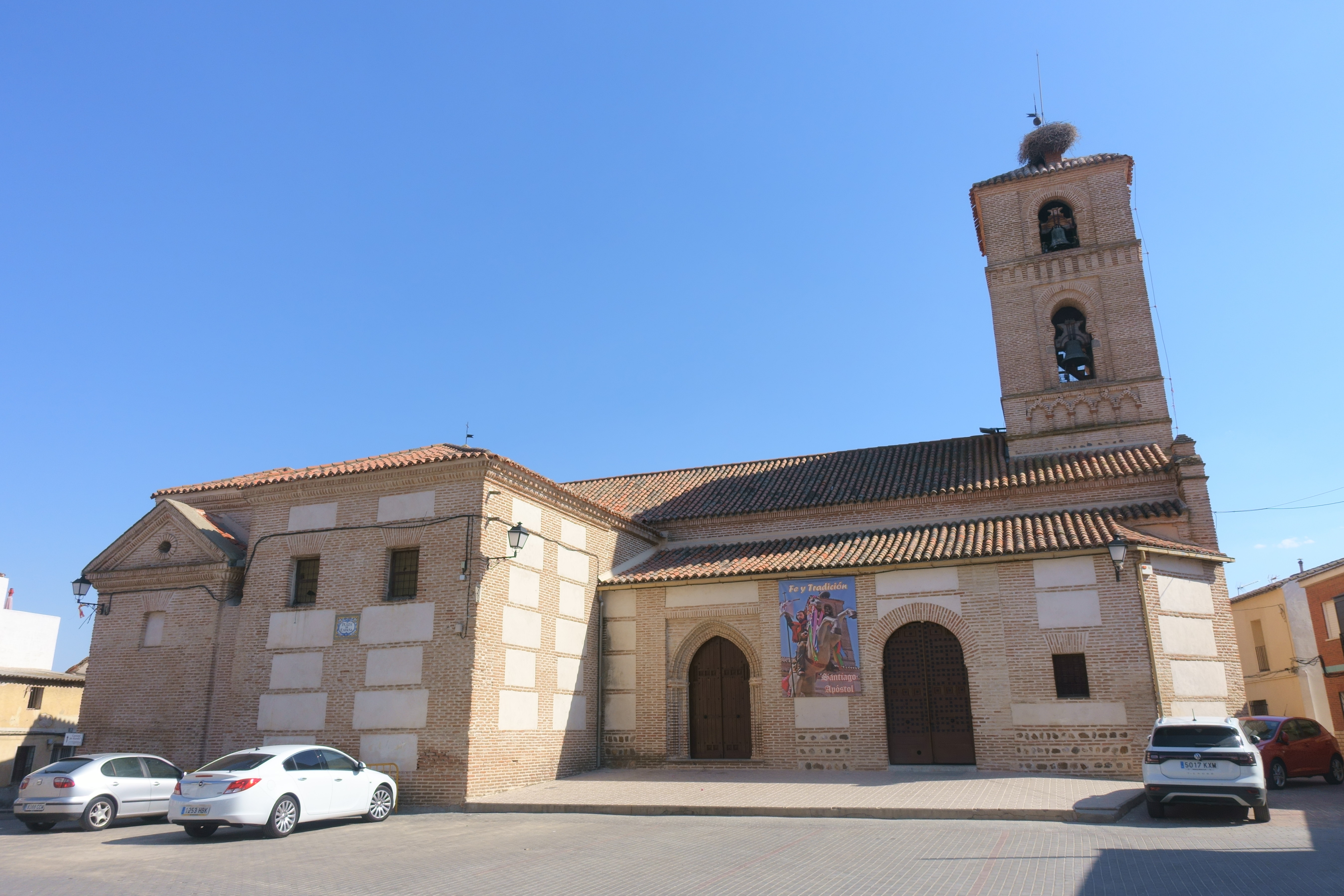
Church of San Miguel Arcángel, El Carpio de Tajo, Toledo, Spain

El Carpio de Tajo is a village in the province of Toledo and autonomous community of Castile-La Mancha, Spain.
