= Tareck El Aissami =

Vice President of Venezuela from 2017 to 2018 and convicted political criminal

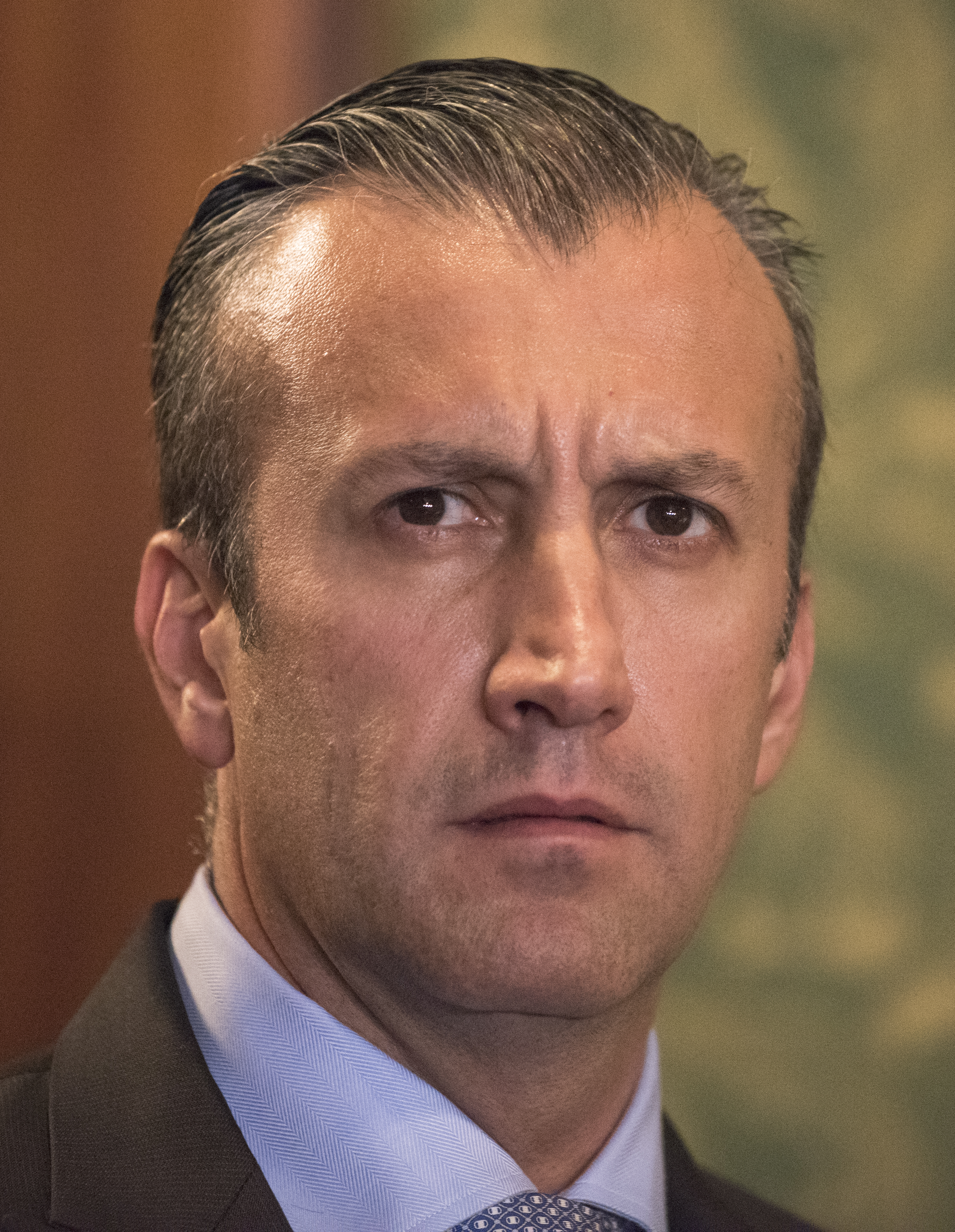
- El Aissami in 2016

Minister of Petroleum
- In office 27 April 2020 – 20 March 2023
- President: Nicolás Maduro
- Preceded by: Manuel Quevedo
- Succeeded by: Pedro Tellechea

Minister of Industries and National Production
- In office 14 June 2018 – 19 August 2021
- President: Nicolás Maduro
- Preceded by: Juan Arias Palacio
- Succeeded by: Jorge Arreaza

Vice President of Venezuela
- In office 4 January 2017 – 14 June 2018
- President: Nicolás Maduro
- Preceded by: Aristóbulo Istúriz
- Succeeded by: Delcy Rodríguez

Governor of Aragua
- In office 27 December 2012 – 4 January 2017
- Preceded by: Rafael Isea
- Succeeded by: Caryl Bertho

Minister of Interior and Justice
- In office 8 September 2008 – 13 October 2012
- President: Hugo Chávez
- Preceded by: Ramón Rodríguez Chacín
- Succeeded by: Néstor Reverol

Deputy of the National Assembly of Venezuela
- In office 10 January 2006 – 16 January 2007
- Constituency: Mérida

Personal details
- Born: Tareck Zaidan El Aissami Maddah; 12 November 1974 (age 51) El Vigía, Mérida, Venezuela
- Party: PSUV (2007–2023)
- Other political affiliations: MVR (2003–2007)
- Spouse: Rudy Amer de El Aissami
- Children: 2
- Relatives: Haifa El Aissami (sister); Shibli al-Aysami (great-uncle)
- Education: University of the Andes
- Profession: Politician

Criminal details
- Criminal information
- Convictions: Embezzlement, Treason

Details
- Date apprehended: 9 April 2024
- Imprisoned at: Fuerte Tiuna

Tareck Zaidan El Aissami Maddah (Note: Spanish pronunciation: [taˈɾek ˈsajdan el ajˈsami ˈmaða]) (born 12 November 1974) is a Venezuelan politician who served as the vice president of Venezuela from 2017 to 2018. He served as Minister of Industries and National Production since 14 June 2018, and as Minister of Petroleum from 27 April 2020 until 20 March 2023. He previously was Minister of the Interior and Justice from 2008 to 2012, Governor of Aragua from 2012 to 2017, and the vice president of Venezuela from 2017 to 2018. While holding that office, El Aissami faced allegations of participating in corruption, money laundering and drug trafficking associated also to Hezbollah. In 2019, U.S. Immigration and Customs Enforcement (ICE) added El Aissami to the ICE Most Wanted List, listed by the Homeland Security Investigations unit. El Aissami, who was among the power brokers in Nicolás Maduro's government, resigned on 20 March 2023 during a corruption probe. He was arrested by the Venezuelan prosecutor's office on charges of treason, money laundering and criminal association.

== Early life ==
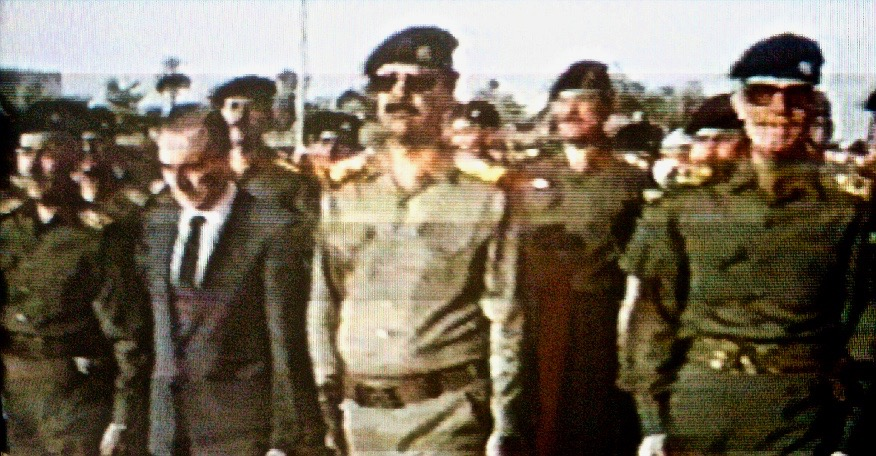
El Aissami's great-uncle, Shibli al-Aysami, in a suit beside Saddam Hussein in July 1989.

El Aissami was born on 12 November 1974 in El Vigía, Mérida, Venezuela. He is one of five children. His mother, May Maddah de El Aissami, is Lebanese while his father, Zaidan El Amin El Aissami, also known as Carlos Zaidan, was a Druze immigrant from Jabal al-Druze in Syria. He was the head of a local Iraqi Ba'athist Party in Venezuela and had connections with leftist political movements in the Middle East. Another family member of El Aissami involved in Ba'athism was his great-uncle, Shibli El Aissami, who was the Assistant Secretary General of the National Command of the Iraqi-dominated Arab Socialist Ba'ath Party.

El Aissami's father supported Hugo Chávez during the February 1992 Venezuelan coup d'état attempt and was arrested. Following the arrest of El Aissami's father in 1992, his great-uncle Shibli El Aissami retired from politics in Iraq, remaining in the country until the 2003 US-led invasion of Iraq.

== Education and militancy ==
Studying both law and criminology, El Aissami attended the University of the Andes (ULA) in Mérida, Venezuela. While there, he was a student of Adán Chávez Frías, the older brother of Hugo Chávez, who was said to have been a mentor to El Aissami. In 1997, he joined the National Youth Directorate of the Fifth Republic Movement to support the election of Hugo Chávez. Near the same time, El Aissami was arrested during an anti-government protest after throwing stones at authorities.

In 2001, El Aissami became president of the student union at ULA. According to the vice rector of academic affairs at ULA, most of the 1,122 students living in the student dormitories at the time were members of Utopia or its allies, that "only 387 are active students and more than 600 have no university connections", and that there were "always weapons there". Unnamed opponents claimed that during student elections El Aissami threatened other candidates with armed gangs, while former governor Florencio Porras (PSUV) accused him of attempting to rig student elections. Following the September 11 attacks in 2001, it was also reported by witnesses that El Aissami had celebrated the attacks on the United States. While a student at ULA, El Assaimi met and befriended Adán Chávez, a political activist and Hugo Chavez' brother. It was through this association that he first engaged in the erly currents of Chavism.

On 27 March 2003, days after the 2003 invasion of Iraq, El Aissami and his father attended a press conference with Iraq's ambassador to Venezuela, denouncing the United States invasion of Iraq and showing "solidarity" with "the defenseless Iraqi people." El Aissami then first met Hugo Chávez while attending ULA and followed Chávez as a self-described radical chavista since. He dedicated time during his post graduate studies to supporting Chávez's Fifth Republic Movement (MVR). In July 2003, El Aissami lost his reelection campaign as president of the student union by 70% compared to other candidates, with the newly elected student council finding their office robbed and damaged. After graduating with magna cum laude honors, El Aissami maintained his connections with fellow ULA students as he entered into politics, with members of Utopia later obtaining positions in Venezuela's Bolivarian government.

== Political career ==
=== ONIDEX ===
In September 2003, Hugo Cabezas, El Aissami's close friend from the ULA and Utopia, was appointed to be the head of the National Office of Identification and Foreigners (ONIDEX), a passport and naturalization agency that was part of Venezuela's interior ministry, by President Hugo Chávez. The same year, after El Aissami had lost the student reelection campaign, Cabezas invited him to work as his deputy at ONIDEX. Cabezas and El Aissami were then assigned to Mission Identidad, a Bolivarian mission tasked with creating national identifications for Venezuelans.

=== National Assembly and Interior Ministry ===
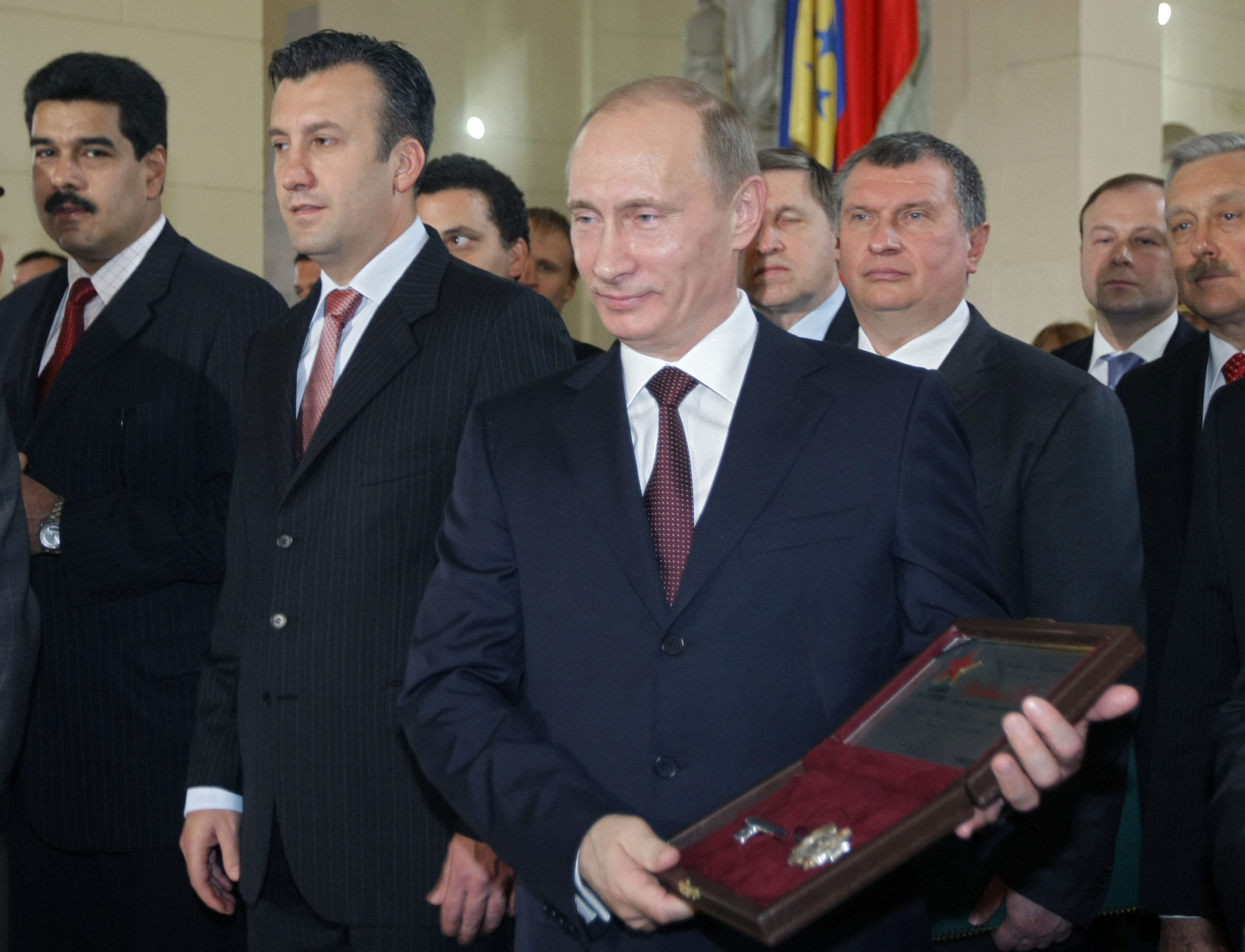
El Aissami, beside Nicolás Maduro, present Vladimir Putin the Key to the City of Caracas in April 2010.

After being established in the capital city of Caracas, El Aissami later campaigned to become a legislator in the National Assembly, winning a seat in the 2005 parliamentary elections.

From 2007 to 2008, he served in the Ministry of the Interior as the Vice Minister of Public Security. In September 2008, Hugo Chávez appointed El Aissami as Minister of the Interior and Justice In 2009, he stated that anti-drug operations in Venezuela had improved following the expulsion of the United States Drug Enforcement Administration (DEA) from Venezuela, stating that the Colombian and United States government anti-drug agencies had "turned into important drug-trafficking cartels". On 24 August 2011, El Aissami announced the ban on the public use of firearms in Venezuela. El Aissami headed the Ministry of the Interior and Justice until he was elected governor in 2012.

=== Governor ===
After his stint at the Ministry of the Interior and Justice, El Aissami was appointed by Chavez as the governor of Aragua and served until 2017. The Iranian military company Qods Aviation, which was sanctioned under the 2007 UN Security Council Resolution 1747, has operated in Aragua since 2008 in collaboration with the Venezuelan Military Industries Company Ltd. The joint project continued throughout El Aissami's tenure.

According to analyst David Smilde of Washington Institute on Latin America (WOLA), while serving as Governor of Aragua, El Aissami "presided over a police force that came to be one of the most violent and abusive in the country". Despite enacting 21 security plans for Aragua, violence continued to increase, with the murder rate at 142 murders per 100,000 citizens in 2016.

=== Vice Presidency ===
President Nicolás Maduro appointed El Aissami as Vice-President on 4 January 2017. As a result, he was the head official of the SEBIN, Venezuela's intelligence agency that is dependent on the office of the vice presidency.

Due to controversy surrounding El Aissami, the appointment was contentious. If the then-proposed recall election were to occur in 2017, he would have become the President of Venezuela until the end of what would have been Maduro's remaining tenure into 2019.

==== Decree powers ====
In terms of budgets, any minister or official is now going to have to ask for Tareck’s permission ... Without a doubt, he’s now the country’s second-most powerful man.

— Jose Vicente Haro, constitutional law professor of Central University of Venezuela

On 26 January 2017, President Maduro ruled by decree that El Aissami could use economic decree powers as well, granting El Aissami powers that a Vice-President in Venezuela had not held before and power that rivaled Maduro's own powers. El Aissami was granted the power to decree over "everything from taxes to foreign currency allotments for state-owned companies" as well as "hiring practices to state-owned enterprises". The move made El Aissami one of the most powerful men in Venezuela.

=== Minister of Industry and National Production ===
In June 2018, El Aissami was named the Minister of Industry and National Production, being tasked with overseeing Venezuela's domestic production.

While serving in the ministry, El Aissami was also named as an External Director of Venezuela's state-run oil company, PDVSA.

=== Minister of Petroleum ===
In April 2020, he was named the Minister of Petroleum. His appointment marks a blow to an era of military control at Petróleos de Venezuela, S.A. (PDVSA).

On 29 November 2022, Petroleum Minister Tarek El Aissami met in Caracas with the president of Chevron Corporation, Javier La Rosa. The Venezuelan ruling party says it is committed to "the development of oil production" after the easing of sanctions. The most important joint ventures where Chevron is involved in Venezuela are Petroboscán, in the west of the nation, and Petropiar, in the eastern Orinoco Belt, with a production capacity of close to 180,000 barrels per day between both projects. In the case of Petroboscán, current production is nil and, in Petropiar, current records indicate close to 50,000 barrels per day.

Al Aissami resigned from his position on Monday 20 March 2023 via Twitter, with his resignation accepted by Venezuelan President Nicolás Maduro. Al Aissami has been accused of corruption and financial mismanagement. He was arrested by the Venezuelan prosecutor's office on charges of treason, money laundering and criminal association. He was replaced in his role as Minister by Pedro Rafael Tellechea.

== Controversies ==
=== Drug trafficking and money laundering allegations ===
Secretary of the United States Department of the Treasury, Steven Mnuchin, making comments regarding the sanctions against Tareck El Aissami.

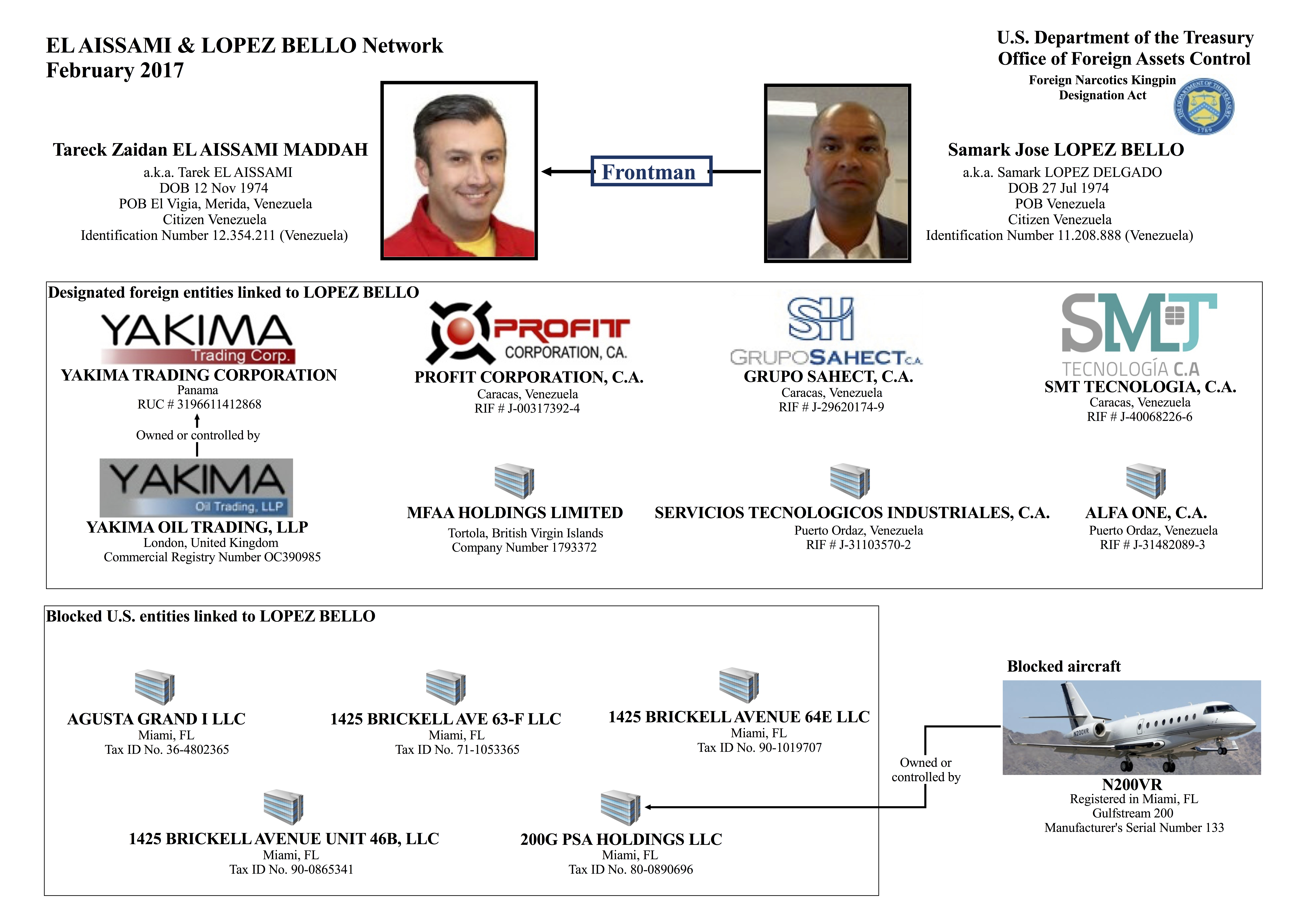
The United States Department of the Treasury's representation of Tareck El Aissami's alleged network of drug trafficking and money laundering.

Since 2011, the Homeland Security Investigations branch of the United States Immigration and Customs Enforcement and the United States Drug Enforcement Administration (DEA) have investigated El Aissami for his alleged acts of money laundering in the Middle East, specifically in Lebanon. According to The Wall Street Journal, El Aissami has been under investigation by the United States for his alleged activities in drug trafficking since 2015. Rafael Isea, the preceding governor of Aragua, stated that El Aissami was allegedly paid off by drug kingpin Walid Makled in order to receive drug shipments in Venezuela. Before being extradited to Venezuela Makled allegedly told DEA agents that from 2007 to 2012, he paid El Aissami's brother, Feras El Aissami, and told them to launder the money in the Venezuelan oil industry.

On 13 February 2017 El Aissami was sanctioned by the US Treasury Department under the Foreign Narcotics Kingpin Designation Act. US officials accused him of facilitating drug shipments from Venezuela to Mexico and the US, freezing tens of millions of dollars of assets purportedly under El Aissami's control. A day later, Venezuela's opposition-controlled National Assembly voted in favour of opening an investigation into El Aissami's alleged involvement in drug trafficking. El Aissami has denied any criminal wrongdoing while President Maduro defended him saying "Venezuela will respond, step by step, with balance and force ... They will retract and apologize publicly to our vice president", while also stating that El Aissami had arrested more than 100 drug traffickers, with 21 being extradited to the United States. In an open letter, published as an advertisement in The New York Times, El Aissami stated: "I have no assets or accounts in the United States or in any country of the world, and it is both absurd and pathetic that an American administrative body —without presenting any evidence— adopts a measure to freeze goods and assets that I do not own at all."

In 2019, U.S. Immigration and Customs Enforcement (ICE) added El Aissami to the list of 10 most wanted fugitives. On 26 March 2020, the U.S. Department of State offered $10 million for information to bring him to justice in relation to drug trafficking and narco-terrorism.

==== Narcosobrinos incident ====
Following arrests surrounding the Narcosobrinos incident, an event that resulted in the arrest and conviction of President Maduro's nephews found guilty of attempting to smuggle 800 kilos of cocaine into the United States, links were allegedly found between El Aissami and an accomplice who was arrested in Honduras. According to a source speaking to El Nuevo Herald about the incident, Roberto de Jesús Soto Garcia, a Honduran man who provided logistical information on drug shipments for Maduro's nephews, assisted El Aissami as well. The source stated Soto Garcia worked with a group of Venezuelan officials, called the Cartel of the Suns, and that he worked "particularly with the operation headed by Tarek El Aissami, and his company. He's someone who has been working with them for some time now." According to testimony from the nephews, the cocaine that was to be transported to the United States by the two was allegedly supplied by El Aissami.

=== Terrorism network allegations ===
A report by the Center for a Secure Free Society released in 2014 alleged that El Aissami has "developed a sophisticated financial network and multi-level networks as a criminal-terrorist pipeline to bring Islamic militants to Venezuela and neighboring countries, and to send illicit funds from Latin America to the Middle East." The alleged "pipeline" consists of 40 shell companies which have bank accounts in Venezuela, Panama, Curacao, St. Lucia, Miami and Lebanon and is also involved in drug smuggling. Former Vice President José Vicente Rangel, who served under Hugo Chávez, denounced the SFS study, stating that it was a "combined campaign" by SFS and the Canadian government to attack Venezuela, though Ben Rowswell, the Canadian ambassador in Venezuela, denied the accusations by Rangel.

In a 2015 report by the United States Department of State, "There were credible reports that Venezuela maintained a permissive environment that allowed for support of activities that benefited known terrorist groups." New York County District Attorney Robert M. Morgenthau stated that while El Aissami was head of ONIDEX, Venezuela's passport and naturalization agency, he provided passports to Hamas and Hezbollah members. He also stated that it was possible that El Aissami was recruiting Arab Venezuelans to train under Hezbollah in southern Lebanon. Joseph Humire, executive director of SFS, states that "Tareck’s network is less ideological and more of a service provider ... It’s not so much built on an ideological affinity to anybody, but who wants to pay to play."

In February 2017, CNN reported in its article "Venezuelan Passports, in the Wrong Hands?", an investigation performed focusing on the sale of Venezuelan passports to individuals in the Middle East, specifically Syria, Palestine, Iraq and Pakistan. According to Misael López Soto, a former employee at the Venezuelan embassy in Iraq who was also a lawyer and CICPC officer, the Bolivarian government would sell authentic passports to individuals from the Middle East, with the Venezuelan passport able to access 130 countries throughout the world without a visa requirement. López provided CNN documents showing how his superiors attempted to cover up the sale of passports, which were being sold for from $5,000 to $15,000 per passport. A confidential intelligence report obtained by CNN linked El Aissami to 173 passports and IDs given between 2008 and 2015 to individuals from the Middle East, some of whom were purportedly associated with Hezbollah.

The Venezuelan government did not investigate the allegations made by López and instead initiated an investigation against him for his act of leaking "confidential" documents and stated that he had abandoned his duty. Following the release of the CNN report, President Maduro demanded that CNN leave Venezuela, stating that the network had sought to "manipulate" Venezuelans.

=== Sanctions ===
El Aissami has been sanctioned by several countries.

The United States Treasury Department sanctioned El Aissami on 13 February 2017 under the Foreign Narcotics Kingpin Designation Act after being accused of facilitating drug shipments from Venezuela to Mexico and the United States, freezing tens of millions of dollars of assets purportedly under El Aissami's control.

Canada sanctioned El Aissami on 22 September 2017 due to rupture of Venezuela's constitutional order following the 2017 Venezuelan Constituent Assembly election.

The European Union sanctioned El Aissami on 25 June 2018, with his assets frozen and being banned from travel. The European Union stated that when El Aissami was Vice President of Venezuela, the SEBIN intelligence service, under his command, made him "responsible for the serious human rights violations carried out by the organization, including arbitrary detention, politically motivated investigations, inhumane and degrading treatment, and torture".

Switzerland sanctioned El Aissami on 10 July 2018, freezing his assets and imposing a travel ban while citing the same reasons of the European Union.

== Personal life ==
El Aissami is married and has two children. His sister, Haifa El Aissami, served as Venezuela's ambassador to the Netherlands until 2016. El Aissami is often seen surrounded by his bodyguards, whom he personally selects.

El Aissami and his father both showed support for the government of Saddam Hussein following the U.S. invasion of Iraq in 2003. His father, Zaidan, wrote the article "Proud to be a Taliban", describing United States President George W. Bush as "genocidal, mentally deranged, a liar and a racist" while also describing the leader of Al-Qaeda as "the great Mujahedeen, Sheik Osama bin Laden". Zaidan El Aissami also alleged that the United States may have been responsible for the 11 September terrorist attacks to create an excuse to invade Afghanistan.

On 4 February 2015, it was revealed that Aragua FC had signed him as a striker. Aragua FC was heavily sponsored by El Aissami's entities and there are no records of him receiving playing time on the field as of January 2017.

Prior to his participation in dialogue between the opposition and Venezuelan government as well as his appointment to the vice presidency, members of El Aissami's family, including his father and mother, traveled to stay in the United States for unknown reasons in late October 2016.

== See also ==
- List of ministers of interior of Venezuela
- Esteban Trapiello

== Notes ==
Political offices
Preceded by Ramón Rodríguez Chacín	Minister of Interior and Justice; 2008–2012	Succeeded by Néstor Reverol
Preceded by Rafael Isea	Governor of Aragua; 2012–2017	Succeeded by Caryl Bertho
Preceded by Aristóbulo Istúriz	Vice President of Venezuela; 2017–2018	Succeeded by Delcy Rodríguez
