= Caicara de Maturín =

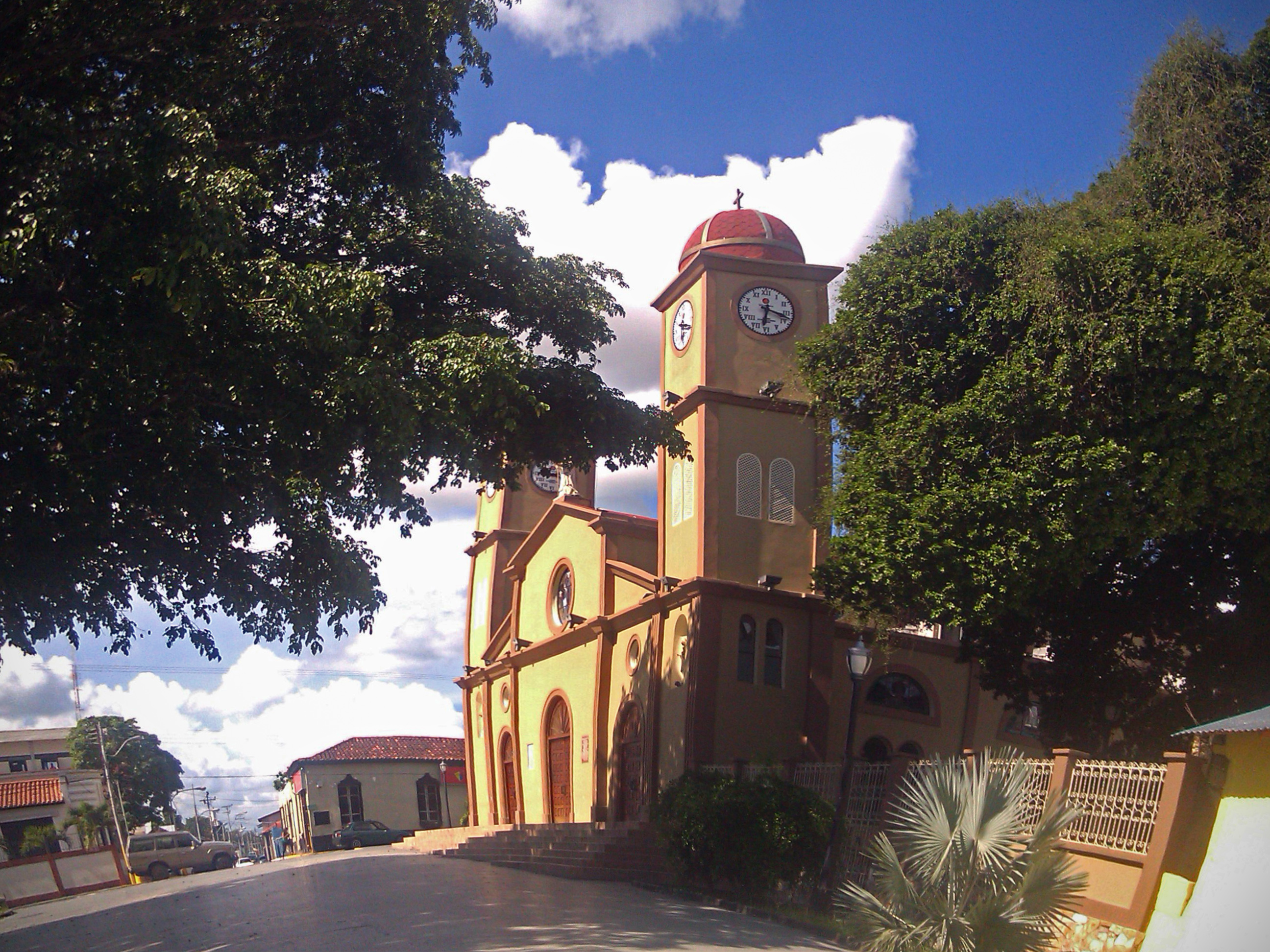

- Location in Venezuela
- Coordinates: 9°48′59″N 63°36′55″W
- Country: Venezuela
- State: Monagas
- Municipality: Cedeño

Caicara de Maturín is the capital of the municipality of Cedeño in the state of Monagas in Venezuela. It is located in the western part of the Monagas state, northeast of the city of Punta de Mata. It was founded on April 20, 1731. It has approximately a little less than 20,000 inhabitants.

== Towns near Caicara de Maturín ==
Some towns near Caicara de Maturín are Jusepin, Areo, San Félix de Cantalicio, Viento Fresco, Bejucales, Merecure, La Quebrada de Caicara, El Macal, La Laguna, El Caituco.

== History ==
The area was inhabited by chaimas when Spanish Capuchin missionaries arrived, among them the Aragonese Fray Antonio de Blesa who founded a town with the name of Santo Domingo de Guzmán de Caycuar on April 20, 1731. Caicara means "quebrada de las ceibas" in the language of indigenous peoples.

In April 2013, President Nicolás Maduro, together with Governor Yelitza Santaella, visited the town of Caicara and inaugurated a type I Mercal.

== Notable people ==
- Manuel Núñez Tovar (1878-1925) naturalist, parasitologist and entomologist.
- Emilio Arévalo Cedeño (1882-1965) who was head of the telegraph station when he joined the guerrillas against General Juan Vicente Gómez at the beginning of the 20th century.
- Celestino Rafael Zamora Montes de Oca (November 5, 1928), surgeon graduated from the University of Zulia, member of the National Academy of Medicine 2005.

== Culture ==
- Baile del Mono de Caicara (Dance of the Caicara′s Monkey).

== Notes and references ==
https://elperiodicodemonagas.com.ve/monagas/distribucion-de-alcaldias-en-monagas-psuv-9-y-oposicion-4/ https://web.archive.org/web/20141006103233/http://www.laprensademonagas.info/Articulo.aspx?s=3&aid=146033
