= Franco Carpio =

Peruvian engineer and politician

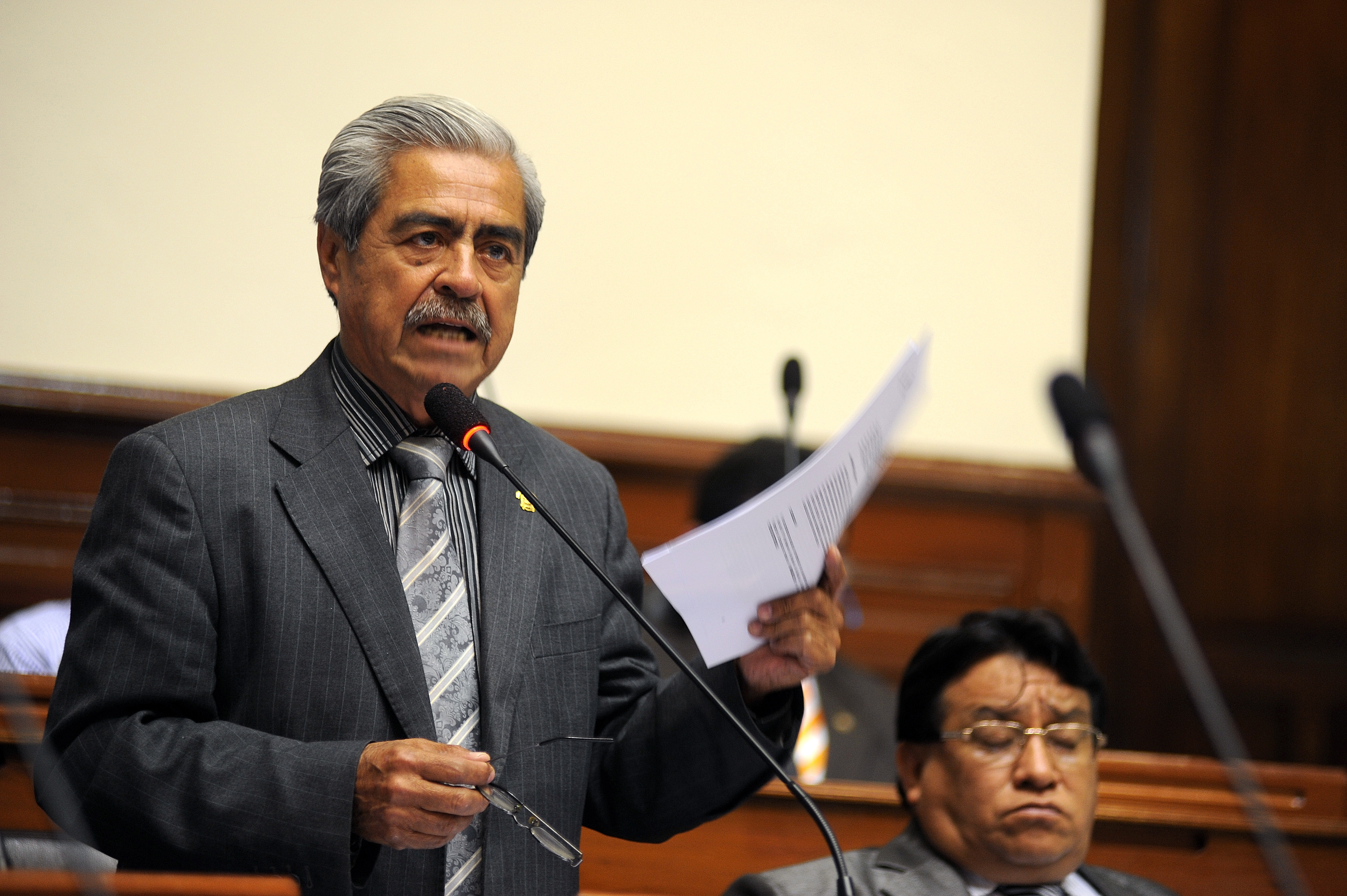
- Carpio in 2010

Member of Congress
- In office 26 July 2006 – 26 July 2011
- Constituency: Lambayeque

Personal details
- Born: Franco Carpio Guerrero; 4 February 1946 (age 80) Lambayeque, Peru
- Party: Christian People's Party
- Other political affiliations: National Unity
- Occupation: Politician
- Profession: Engineer

Franco Carpio Guerrero (born 4 February 1946) is a Peruvian engineer and politician, who is a former Congressman, elected in the 2006 elections to represent the Lambayeque region for the 2006–2011 term under the National Unity list. Carpio belongs to the Christian People's Party. Carpio unsuccessfully ran for re-election in the 2011 elections, when he ran for re-election under the Alliance for the Great Change of Pedro Pablo Kuczynski in which the Christian Democrats has integrated, but he received a minority of votes and was not returned to Congress. He subsequently retired from politics.
