= Rosalba Vivas =

Venezuelan politician

- Occupation: Politician

Rosalba Vivas Briceña is a Venezuelan politician. She was a deputy for the Barinas state to the National Assembly, entering as the main deputy in 2013 to replace Maigualida Santana.
