= Carpino (surname) =

Carpino is a surname in the Italian language.

People with the surname include

- Christie Carpino, American politician
- Francesco Carpino (1905–1993), Italian cardinal
- John Carpino, American baseball executive
- Pasquale Carpino (1936–2005), Italian-Canadian chef

== See also ==
- Carpinoni
