= Carpini =

Carpini may refer to:

- Giovanni da Pian del Carpine, medieval Italian diplomat, archbishop and explorer and one of the first Europeans to enter the court of the Great Khan
- Thiago Carpini Barbosa (born 1984), Brazilian professional football manager and former player

== See also ==
- Carpino
