= Eduardo Manuitt Carpio =

Venezuelan politician

61st Governor of Guárico
- In office 1999–2008
- Preceded by: Rafael Emilio Silveira
- Succeeded by: Willian Lara

Personal details
- Born: 28 July 1950 (age 75)
- Party: Patria Para Todos
- Profession: Politician

Eduardo Manuitt Carpio (born 28 July 1950) is a Venezuelan politician. He was the co-founder of the party La Causa Radical and represented it in the Venezuelan Congress. When La Causa split in the late 1990s, he became a leader of the Patria Para Todos (PPT) faction, and represented it in Congress. He was the Governor of Guárico state from 1999 to 2008, originally for the PPT, and later for the PSUV.

Manuitt won the gubernatorial elections in 1998, 1999 (under the new Constitution of Venezuela) and 2004 as a PPT candidate. In 2007 he joined the newly created PSUV, but was subsequently expelled after supporting his daughter's PPT candidacy for governor, after she had failed in the PSUV primaries to be nominated as the PSUV candidate.

In April 2009 he went into hiding after being charged with corruption allegedly committed while Governor.
