= Jesse Chacón =

Venezuelan politician, engineer and military officer

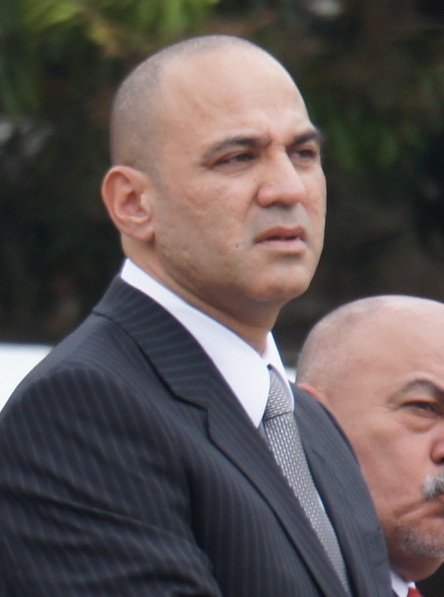
- March 2013

Minister of Interior and Justice
- In office September 2004 – January 2007
- President: Hugo Chavez
- Preceded by: Lucas Rincón Romero
- Succeeded by: Pedro Carreño

Minister of the Office of the President
- In office January 2008 – 2008

Minister of Communications and Information
- In office December 2008 – April 2009
- Preceded by: (new post)
- Succeeded by: Blanca Eckhout

Minister of Science and Technology
- In office April 2009 – December 2009

Personal details
- Born: 9 November 1965 (age 60)
- Party: PSUV
- Education: Military Academy of Venezuela

Jesse Alonso Chacón Escamillo (Caracas, 9 November 1965) is a Venezuelan politician, engineer, and former military officer. Chacón participated in the November 1992 coup attempt the second attempted coup of that year, when he took part in the occupation of the station of the state television station channel Venezolana de Televisión (VTV), where several workers of the station were killed. Two years after the coup, he was pardoned by president Rafael Caldera. During Hugo Chávez's tenure, he served in many high ranking positions, such as minister of communications, minister of interior and justice and minister of electric power.

== Education ==
Jesse Chacón graduated from the Military Academy in 1987 obtaining a degree in Military Arts In 1996 he received his degree in systems engineering from the Polytechnic University of the National Armed Forces (UNEFA). He also completed a postgraduate study in Telematics at the National Institute of Telecommunications in France and the Simón Bolívar University in Caracas.

While holding the rank of lieutenant he participated in the coup d'état on 27 November 1992 in Venezuela, which followed the coup in February 1992 earlier that year against the government of President Carlos Andrés Pérez. He took part in the occupation of the station of the state television station channel Venezolana de Televisión (VTV), where several workers of the station were killed.

A military tribunal sentenced him of 22 years of imprisonment, but two years after the coup president Rafael Caldera pardoned the soldiers involved.

== Public functions ==
Chacón was born on 9 November 1965 and studied Military Art and Sciences at the Military Academy of Venezuela (the 'Instituto Politécnico de la Fuerza Armada Nacional', or Polytechnic Institute of the National Armed Forces). As a lieutenant in the military, he participated in the November 1992 attempted coup (the second attempted coup of that year), for which he spent time in jail. He participated in the occupation of the station of the state television station channel Venezolana de Televisión (VTV), where several workers of the station were killed.

In 1999 Chacón worked at the General Administration of Operations of the National Commission of Telecommunications (Conatel) coordinating the working teams that prepared the Organic Law on Telecommunications and the National Plan of Telecommunications. In May 2001 he was appointed General Director of Conatel.

.In July 2003 Jesse Chacón was appointed as the first Minister of Communications. He was Director of Communications for the option of "No" in the campaign for the recall referendum in 2004.

Chacon acted as Minister of Interior and Justice between 2004 and January 2007, under the presidency of Hugo Chávez. While in this post he achieved the creation of the National Commission on Police Reform (CONAREPOL).

On January 9, 2007, Chacón was appointed as Minister of Telecommunications and Informatics. During his administration the Venezuelan State could nationalize the provider company of phone and internet services CANTV, He presided over the closure of television broadcaster RCTV.

In January 2008 Jesse Chacón was appointed Minister of the Secretariat of the Presidency, where he supported the administration of president Hugo Chávez.

He held the post of Minister of Communications again between December 2008 and April 2009, which was named at the time Ministry of the People's Power for Communication and Information (MINCI). Chacón was the head of Publicity and Propaganda of the Socialist United Party of Venezuela for the option "YES" in the campaign for the constitutional amendment.

In April 2009 Chacón is appointed as Minister for Science, Technology and Intermediate Industries until December 6, 2009. He submitted his resignation after the arrest of his brother Arné Chacón for his alleged links with an investigation started after the intervention of seven financial institutions in Venezuela.

In April 2013, Jesse Chacón is appointed as Minister of Electric Power.

By the end of 2015 President Nicolás Maduro appointed Jesse Chacón as ambassador in Austria.

== See also ==
- Cabinet of Hugo Chávez
