= Ismael García =

Venezuelan politician

Ismael García (born in 1954) is a Venezuelan politician. He was the leader of PODEMOS, a socialist party which won the second most seats in the National Assembly of Venezuela in the 2005 election.

Although the party formerly supported the program of President Hugo Chávez, it broke decisively with the ruling party over the 2007 constitutional referendum, and García was then heavily criticized by Chávez. In 2012, following a decision by the Supreme Tribunal of Justice that handed over the party's leadership to Didalco Bolívar, Garcia left PODEMOS and founded Progressive Advance with Henri Falcón. However, in 2014, Garcia left that party to become a member of Primero Justicia.
