= María Cristina Iglesias =

Venezuelan politician

María Cristina Iglesias is a Venezuelan politician and leader. She is the leader of the United Socialist Party of Venezuela. She is a two-time minister in the Government of Venezuela. She was first Minister for Labour and Social Security, she was subsequently appointed Minister of Commerce.

== Early life and career ==
On April 21, 2013, she was reaffirmed on the national network as Minister of Labour and Social Security for the government of Nicolás Maduro. In 2015 she was a candidate for circuit 3 of the Anzoátegui state for the 2015 parliamentary elections, where she lost to the candidates of the Democratic Unity Roundtable (MUD).

== Controversies ==
In August 2012, different print media published a photo of María Cristina Iglesias, where she is linked as a member of an opposition party Democratic Action to the ruling party of Venezuela (PSUV).
