= Diego del Carpio =

- Municipality
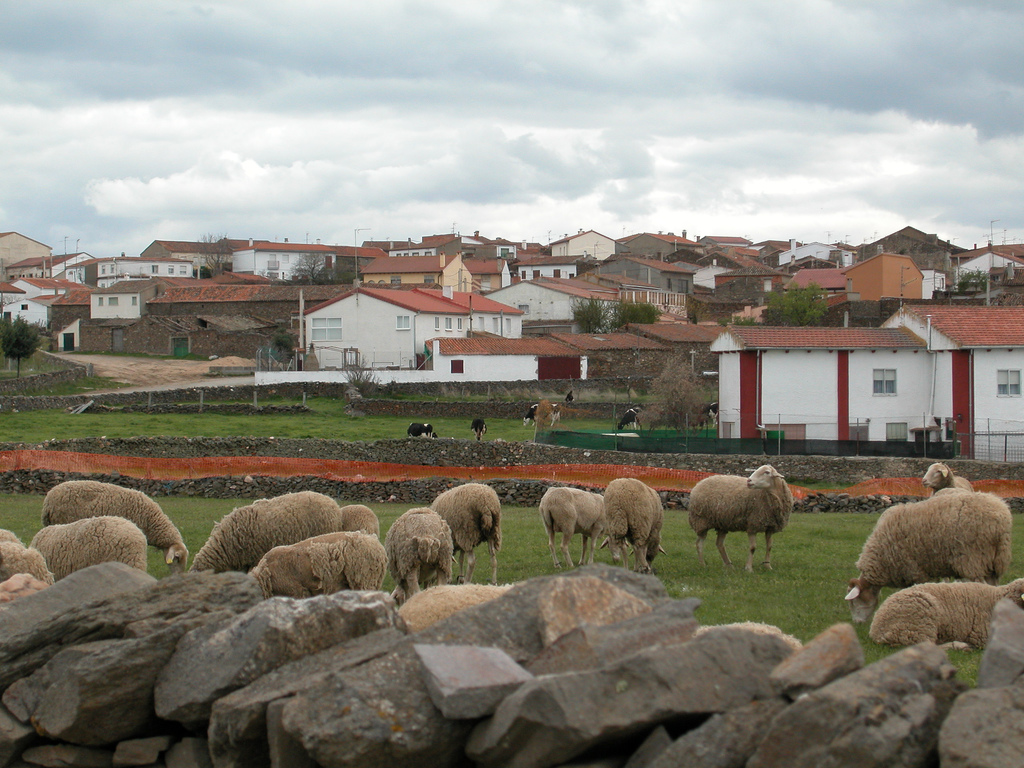
- Diego Álvaro

- Flag Coat of arms

- Location in Spain. Diego del Carpio (Spain)
- Coordinates: 40°40′07″N 5°20′03″W
- Country: Spain
- Autonomous community: Castile and León
- Province: Ávila
- Municipality: Diego del Carpio

Area
  - Total: 33.81 km^{2} (13.05 sq mi)
- Elevation: 1,052 m (3,451 ft)

Population (2025-01-01)
  - Total: 107
  - Density: 3.16/km^{2} (8.20/sq mi)
- Time zone: UTC+1 (CET)
  - Summer (DST): UTC+2 (CEST)
- Website: Official website

Diego del Carpio is a municipality located in the province of Ávila, Castile and León, Spain.

== Population ==
Historical population
Year	Pop.	±% p.a.
2023	108	—
2024	106	−1.85%
2025	107	+0.94%
Source: INE
