= Liris Sol Velásquez =

Venezuelan politician

Member of the National Assembly
- In office 5 January 2011 – 5 January 2016

Personal details
- Party: United Socialist Party of Venezuela (PSUV)

Liris Sol Velásquez is a Venezuelan politician who was a member of the National Assembly for the United Socialist Party of Venezuela (PSUV) and for the Bolívar state. She was a member of the parliamentary Permanent Family Commission and she also worked in the mayorship of the Caroní Municipality.
