= Willian Lara =

Venezuelan politician

Willian Rafael Lara

Minister of Communications and Information of Venezuela
- In office 2006–2008
- President: Hugo Chavez
- Preceded by: Yuri Pimentel
- Succeeded by: Andrés Izarra

62nd Governor of Guárico
- In office 2008–2010
- Preceded by: Eduardo Manuitt
- Succeeded by: Arturo Suárez

Personal details
- Born: 28 July 1959 El Socorro, Venezuela
- Died: 10 September 2010 (aged 51)
- Party: Fifth Republic Movement (MVR) (before 2007); United Socialist Party of Venezuela (PSUV) (2007-10)
- Spouse: Gisela Toro de Lara
- Profession: Politician

Willian Lara (28 July 1959 – 10 September 2010) was a Venezuelan politician. Elected several times to the National Assembly, he was the Minister of Communication and Information between 2006 and 2008 and Governor of Guárico state from 2008 to 2010. Prior to the creation of the PSUV in 2007, he was the national director of its main predecessor, the Fifth Republic Movement (MVR), having been one of its founders in 1997.

== Biography ==
Lara was born in El Socorro, in Guárico state, in 1959. After studying social communication at the Central University of Venezuela and completing a master's degree in political science at the Simón Bolívar University, he became a professor at the latter.

He was elected to the National Assembly in 2000 and was its president from 2000 to 2002. He was elected to the 1999 Constitutional Assembly which wrote the new Constitution of Venezuela. Lara played a key role in the efforts to institute internal democracy in the MVR; in June 2003 it became the first Venezuelan political party to do so, with over a million members taking part in the first elections.

In early 2006 Lara sharply criticized the government's media policy, and was subsequently appointed Minister of Communication and Information, replacing Yuri Pimentel after the latter had been in office only seven months; he was succeeded by Andrés Izarra. He was elected governor of Guárico state in the 2008 regional elections.

On 10 September 2010 at 4:30 in the afternoon, under heavy rain, Willian Lara disappeared after being involved in a traffic accident near the edge of the river Paya in Guárico State. The car, driven by himself, landed in the river. His chauffeur, who was in the co-pilot seat, although injured, survived and was rushed to the hospital. He later said that Lara had gotten out of the vehicle by his own means but he saw Lara's body being taken away by the river's current. Lara's body was found several hours later.

At his funeral, president Hugo Chávez said that "Lara will be remembered as one of the founders of the Bolivarian Republic of Venezuela", (full name of the country since the new Constitution was approved in 2000).
