= Victoria Mata =

Venezuelan politician

Victoria Mata (formally, Mercedes Victoria Mata García) is the Venezuelan minister for Sport. She was appointed on 4 January 2008.

== See also ==
- Cabinet of Hugo Chávez
