= Maryann Hanson =

Venezuelan politician

Maryann Hanson is a Venezuelan politician and was Minister of Education in the Venezuelan government. She was the corporate manager of Socio Educational projects at Palmaven. Similarly, she held positions as general director of Training in Science and Technology of the Ministry of Popular Power for Science, Technology and Intermediate Industries.

On April 21, 2013, she was reaffirmed on the national network as Minister of Education for the government of Nicolás Maduro, a position she already held in the government of Hugo Chávez.
