= For Social Democracy =

Political party in Venezuela

For Social Democracy Por la Democracia Social
- Abbreviation: PODEMOS
- Leader: Didalco Bolívar
- Founded: 2002; 24 years ago
- Split from: Movement for Socialism
- Headquarters: Caracas
- Ideology: Social democracy Democratic socialism
- Political position: Centre-left to left-wing
- National affiliation: Great Patriotic Pole
- Regional affiliation: COPPPAL
- Seats in the Latin American Parliament: 0 / 12
- Seats in the National Assembly: 4 / 277
- Governors of States of Venezuela: 0 / 23
- Mayors: 0 / 337

Website
- https://twitter.com/PartidoPODEMOS

For Social Democracy (Spanish: Por la Democracia Social), abbr. PODEMOS, (Spanish: We can) is a political party in Venezuela. In the 2005 legislative elections the party won 15 out of 165 seats in the National Assembly.

== History ==
The party is led by Ismael García and Didalco Bolívar. It once supported president Hugo Chávez, but refused to join the new United Socialist Party (PSUV) created by the president in 2007, and opposed Chávez's proposals in the 2007 constitutional referendum. Since then, it broke with Chávez and became the only opposition voice in the Parliament. Hugo Chávez accused García of "raising the flags of the right."

PODEMOS is a member of COPPPAL, and used to be a consultative member of Socialist International.

In 2012, the party split and the anti-Chávez faction supporting Ismael García joined the anti-Chávez faction of Fatherland for All, creating Progressive Advance, a centre-left party in opposition to the government. The leadership of PODEMOS was then taken by the pro-Chávez Didalco Bolívar. Under Bolívar's leadership, the party left the Democratic Unity Roundtable and joined the PSUV-led Great Patriotic Pole.

The party's youth wing is called the Unión de Jovenes Podemos.
