= Monagas =

- State of Venezuela
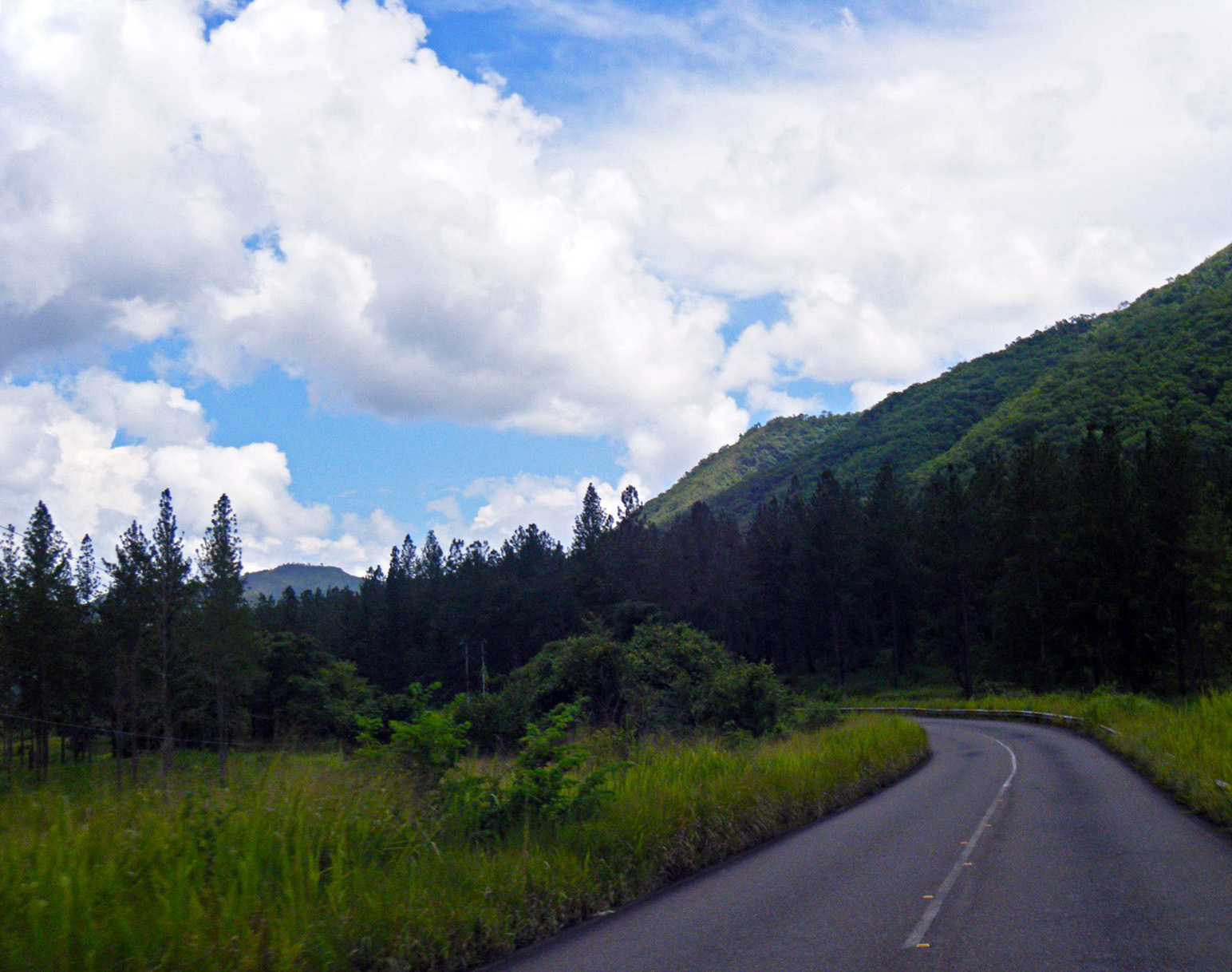
- Road in San Antonio de Capayacuar, on the way to Maturín

- Flag Coat of arms
- Motto(s): Resistió con valor (English: It resisted with courage)
- Anthem: Himno del Estado Monagas
- Location within Venezuela
- Coordinates: 9.43°N 63.08°W
- Country: Venezuela
- Created: 1909
- Capital: Maturín

Government
  - Body: Legislative Council
  - Governor: Ernesto Luna

Area
  - Total: 28,900 km^{2} (11,200 sq mi)
  - Rank: 9th
- 3.15% of Venezuela

Population (2022)
  - Total: 1,460,000
- 3.15% of Venezuela
- Time zone: UTC−4 (VET)
- ISO 3166 code: VE-N
- Emblematic tree: Palma de Moriche (Mauritia flexuosa)
- HDI (2019): 0.702 high · 10th of 24
- Website: http://www.monagas.gob.ve

Monagas State (Spanish: Estado Monagas, IPA: [esˈtaðo moˈnaɣas]) is one of the 23 states of Venezuela.

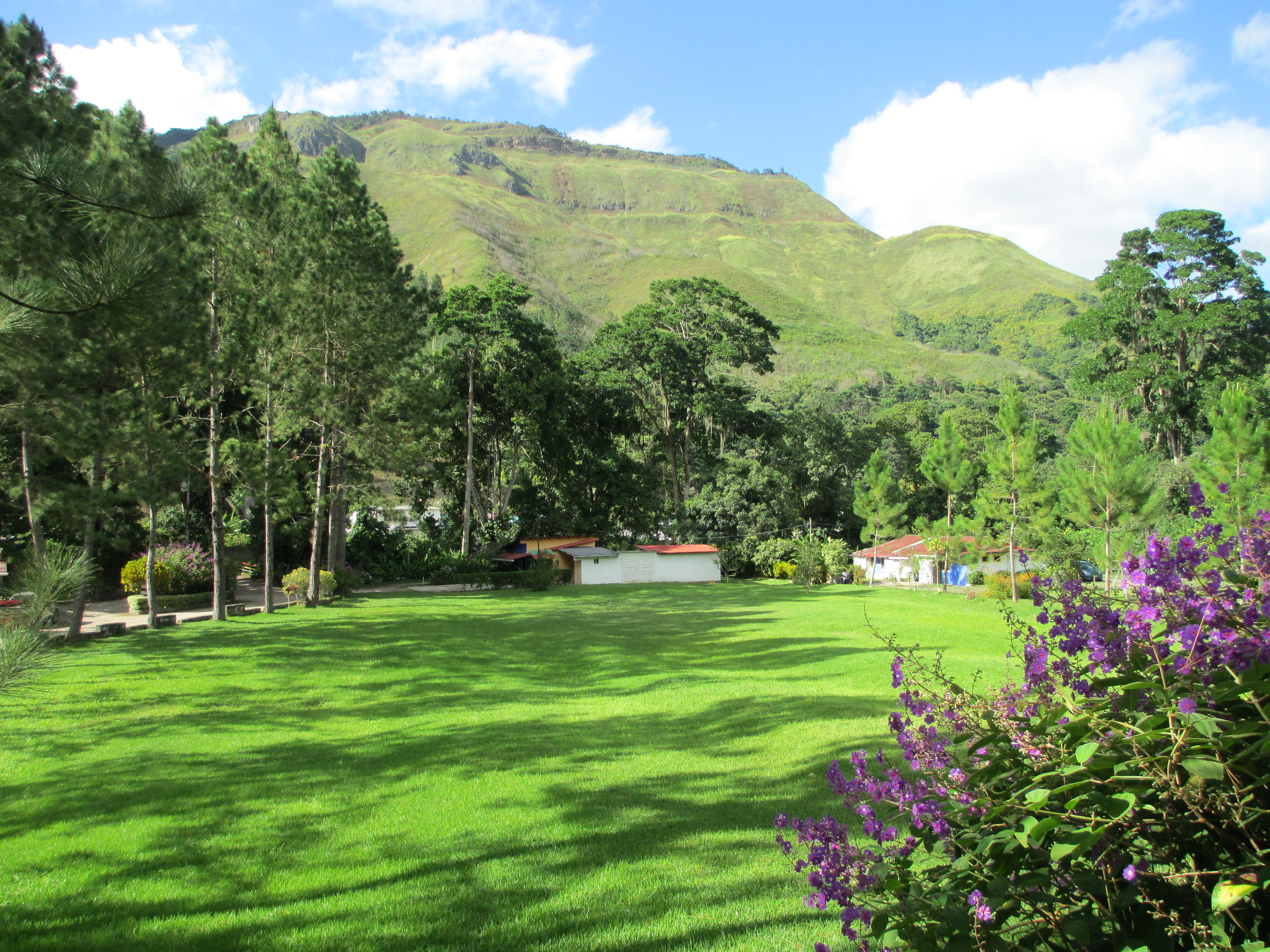
Rural landscape in Monagas

Monagas State covers a total surface area of 28,900 km^{2} (11,200 sq mi) and, as of the 2011 census, had a population of 905,443.

Monagas State is surrounded by Sucre State in the north, Anzoátegui State in the west and south, Bolívar State in the south, Delta Amacuro State in the south and east and the Paria Gulf in the northeast.

The state is named after the general and president of Venezuela José Tadeo Monagas, native from this state, and his brother and fellow president José Gregorio Monagas, native from the neighbor Anzoátegui State.

The capital of the state is Maturín.

== History ==
=== Pre-colonial period ===
Monagas dates back to the settlement of the territory by indigenous people of different ethnic groups hundreds of years ago, among which are the Warao and Kalina people, who mainly settled in the Orinoco Delta, and the Chaima people people in the north of the state. The first aboriginal people to found a presence in the northern part of the region were the Chaima people belonging to the Capaya tribe.

Although settlement of the territory was slow, archaeological excavations and observations by the chroniclers of the Indies point to the existence of a well-developed village in Barrancas in 1530, when the conquistador Diego de Ordaz passed through the area in search of El Dorado. Also in the 16th century, missionaries arrived in the highlands and slowly the Christianisation and re-education of the Indians spread to the south; they thus adapted to a more sedentary life.

In the site where Barrancas is located today, archaeological objects and utensils have been found that belonged to the so-called Barrancoid and Saladoid cultures, the oldest of which have been dated to 1000 years before the Christian era. The archaeological evidence that has been found (and that is still being found) has made it possible to establish that Barrancas has been uninterruptedly inhabited at least since the 11th century, which makes it the oldest town in Venezuela and one of the oldest in the American continent.

=== Spanish colonization ===
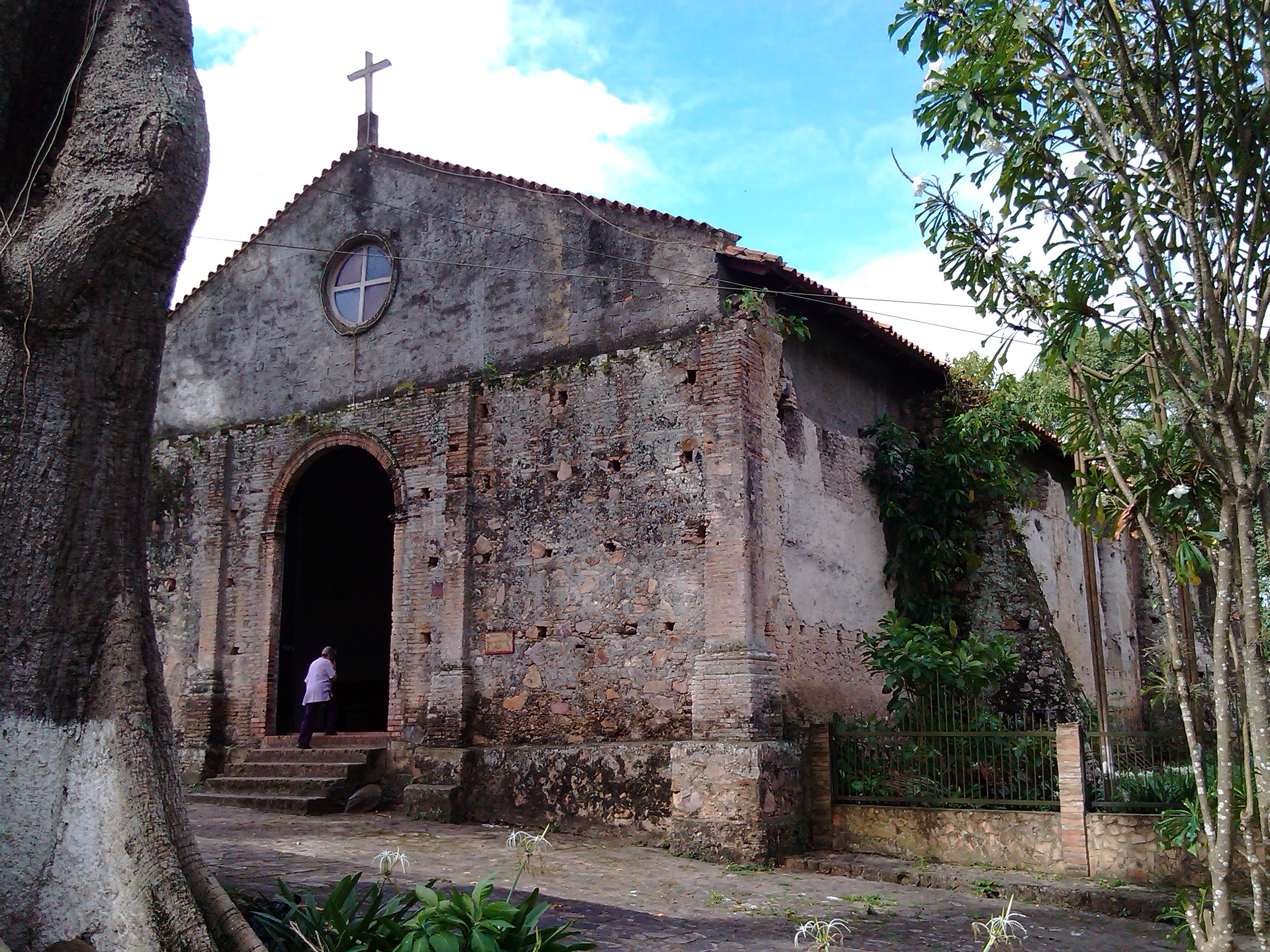
St. Michael the Archangel Colonial Church, a historical monument in Venezuela

Diego de Ordaz, a Spanish explorer obsessed with finding the legendary site of El Dorado, arrived in the village in August 1531 after traveling up the Orinoco River via the Caño Manamo. Impressed by its number of inhabitants – which he estimated at "more than 400 bohíos" ('huts') – he decided to go down and meet personally with the cacique Naricagua, lord of his territories, whose name of the river Uyapari was associated with the village. The chronicler Juan de Castellanos, in his Elegías de varones ilustres de Indias ('Elegies of Illustrious Men of the Indies'), describes it as "a powerful town of great people that on the ravines was placed the Cacique of Uyapari lordship".

The Capuchin missionary Friar Gerónimo de Muro, with the help of the Carib (Kalina), Cuaca and Chaima people, founded the town of San Antonio de Maturín, also known as San Antonio de Capayacuar, on 7 August 1713.

On 20 April 1731, the Aragonese friar Antonio de Blesa founded Santo Domingo de Guzmán de Caycuar; the area was inhabited by Chaima people and outcasts when the Capuchin missionaries arrived. The settlement would later be called Caicara de Maturín.

A Catholic mission of Chaima Indians with the Capuchin missionary Pedro de Gelsa founded the San Miguel Arcangel de Caripe settlement on 12 October 1734, which would later become Caripe.

Maturín was founded on 7 December 1760 by the Capuchin friar Lucas de Zaragoza.

The territory where Aguasay is now located was founded in 1769 by Friar Manuel de La Mata.

Uracoa was founded in 1784 by Friar José de Manzanera. In 1799 the German geographer Alexander von Humboldt and the Frenchman Aimé Bonpland visited Caripe as part of their trip through Venezuela. Other explorers who toured the area were the Italian Agostino Codazzi (1835) and the German Ferdinand Bellermann (1843).

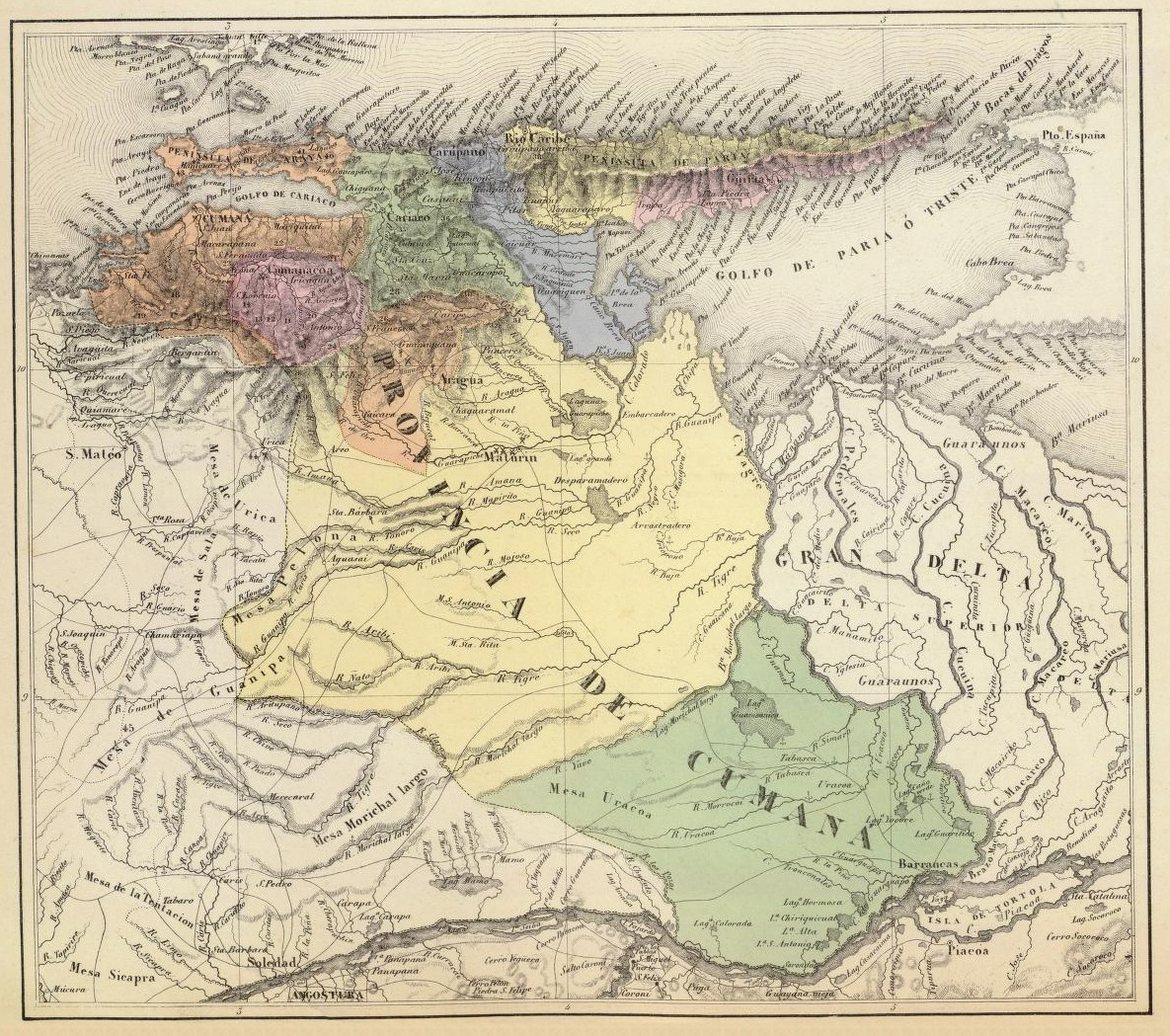
Monagas as part of the province of Cumaná in 1840

=== 19th and 20th centuries ===
In 1856, the Province of Maturín was created, separated from that of Cumaná. By 1864 the State of Maturín was ratified. But in 1879, Monagas was annexed to the State of Oriente and, from 1891 to 1898, it belonged to the State of Bermúdez.

In 1904, Maturín became the capital of the Monagas district of Bermúdez State, whose capital was Cumaná. For a long time, Monagas was an extremely poor state. During the 16th and 17th centuries, the people of the plains and swamps north of the Orinoco, under the rule of the Caribs, made alliances with the French and Dutch as a policy of tenacious resistance against Spanish domination. On ancient maps these lands are called Caribana, kingdom of the Caribs.

In 1909 the State of Monagas was created with its current boundaries in honor of General José Tadeo Monagas. In 1924 the Standard Oil Company started oil exploration activities in the area of Caripito, which experienced a slight repopulation. With the drilling of the Moneb No. 1 well in the Quiriquire field in 1928, oil exploitation began and the area experienced an important boost in urban development due to the arrival of migrant labor, particularly from the Caribbean Islands.

In 1929 the Standard Oil Company began to build the storage yard and the deep water dock on the San Juan River and on 15 October 1930, the tanker Creole Bueno left the port of Caripito with 20,000 barrels of oil bound for Trinidad.

In 1935, the Caripito marine terminal was inaugurated, located on the San Juan River, where Pan American Airways S-42 seaplanes arrived, which included it in their Central American and Caribbean route.

In 1936 Caripito International Airport was selected by aviator Amelia Earhart and her navigator Fred Noonan as the second stopover of their trip around the world, staying overnight at the Standard Oil Company facilities. The event was widely publicized in the international press and the company provided logistical support to continue the flight through South America.

On 15 November 1940, the city of Punta de Mata was founded. On 28 December the same year, the first oil well was drilled in that area. In addition the Legislative Assembly of Monagas considered the convenience of creating the Bolivar District and integrated the municipalities of Punceres and Colon into its territory, designating Caripito as the capital, according to the decree of 19 January 1940, signed by Governor Jose Maria Isava on 30 January of the same year.

Under the direction of the Corporación Venezolana de Guayana, several hectares of Caribbean pine were planted between Barrancas and the nearby town of Uverito, an activity that significantly boosted the development of the area. By the 1970s, it was the most important settlement and port in the state of Monagas, mainly due to the lack of land road connections to the main nearby cities, such as Tucupita (Delta Amacuro) and Puerto Ordaz (State of Bolivar), although today it continues to be an important center for the transport of goods and passengers to these cities.

In 1976, the assets of Creole were nationalized and were managed by Lagoven, later by Corpoven and now by PDVSA in association with Repsol. By closing the refinery in 1976 and the oil terminal in 2002, an attempt was made to boost agricultural activity to take advantage of the fertile areas by growing cocoa, pepper, Xanthosoma (ocumo chino and ocumo blanco) and yucca.

The newspaper El Oriental was founded in 1982 in the city of Maturín. On 20 August 1983, the State Legislative Assembly declared the creation of the Municipal Council of Libertador Municipality, in accordance with the provisions of the Law of Political Territorial Division of the State of Monagas, allowing the creation of Libertador Municipality. Since 1989, with the administrative reforms that were approved for the whole country, the state of Monagas elected for the first time, directly and secretly, its own governor and legislative assembly (called the legislative council since 2000).

In 2021, Cosme Arzolay was temporarily appointed governor. In November the same year, Ernesto Luna was proclaimed governor.

== Geography ==
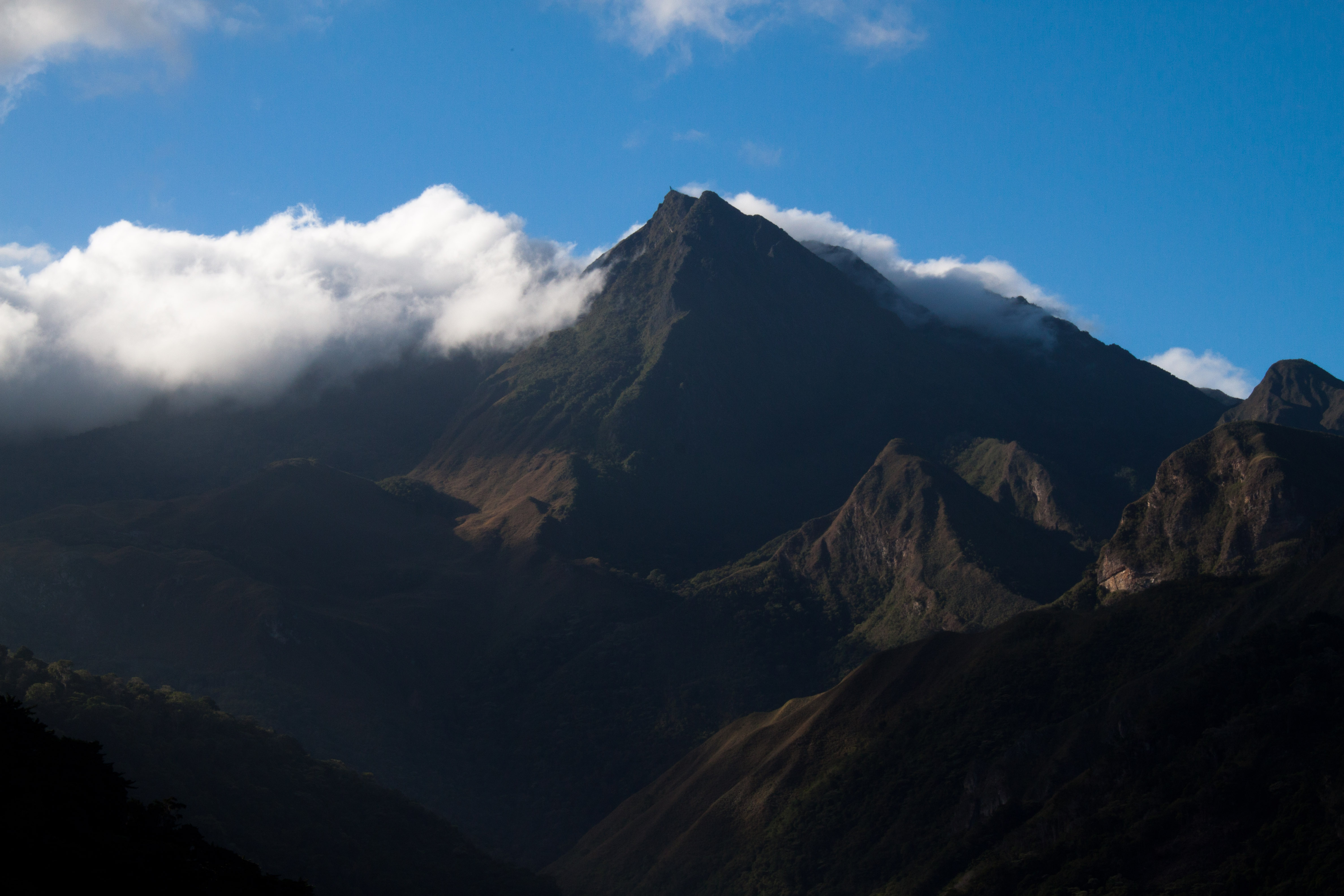
Cerro Negro

=== Relief ===
The state has many plateaus and savannas located in the southwest. In the northeast and the southeast there are deltaic savannas in which rivers such as the San Juan, Guanipa, Caño Mánamo, and Tigre flow into. In the northwest is a group of mountains belonging to the eastern mountain range. This mountain range is divided into two massifs: the massif of el Turimiquire (in which the town of San Antonio is located) and the massif of Caripe (in which the town of Caripe is located). Cerro Negro (2000 m.) is the highest mountain of Monagas State. The mountain landscape features geological material from the Cretaceous, constituted exclusively by sedimentary rocks, predominantly sandstone, shale and limestone, with the main geological formations being El Cantil, Barranquín, Guayuta and Querecual; it has elevations between 400 and 2,300 m (1,300 and 7,500 ft) above sea level, with valleys and depressions.

=== Climate ===
The weather is hot in the area of the Llanos, while it is cold in the mountains located in the north of the state. The average temperature in the low areas is between 25 and 28 °C (77 and 82 °F). In the area of the town of Caripe the cold temperature permits the cultivation of certain kind of typical plants from cold climates such as roses and strawberries. The level of rainfall in the state is between 530 and 1,400 mm (21 and 55 in) during the year.

The region is dominated by a rainy tropical climate with some local variations that respond to various factors such as altitude, wind and proximity to the sea. Most of the state, in the southern strip, has a climate typical of savannas with dry seasons that can last up to six months, which produces a severe water shortage. The average annual temperature of Monagas is approximately 27 °C (81 °F). In Maturín, Temblador and Uverito, average temperatures are between 26 and 27 °C (79 and 81 °F).

=== Hydrology ===
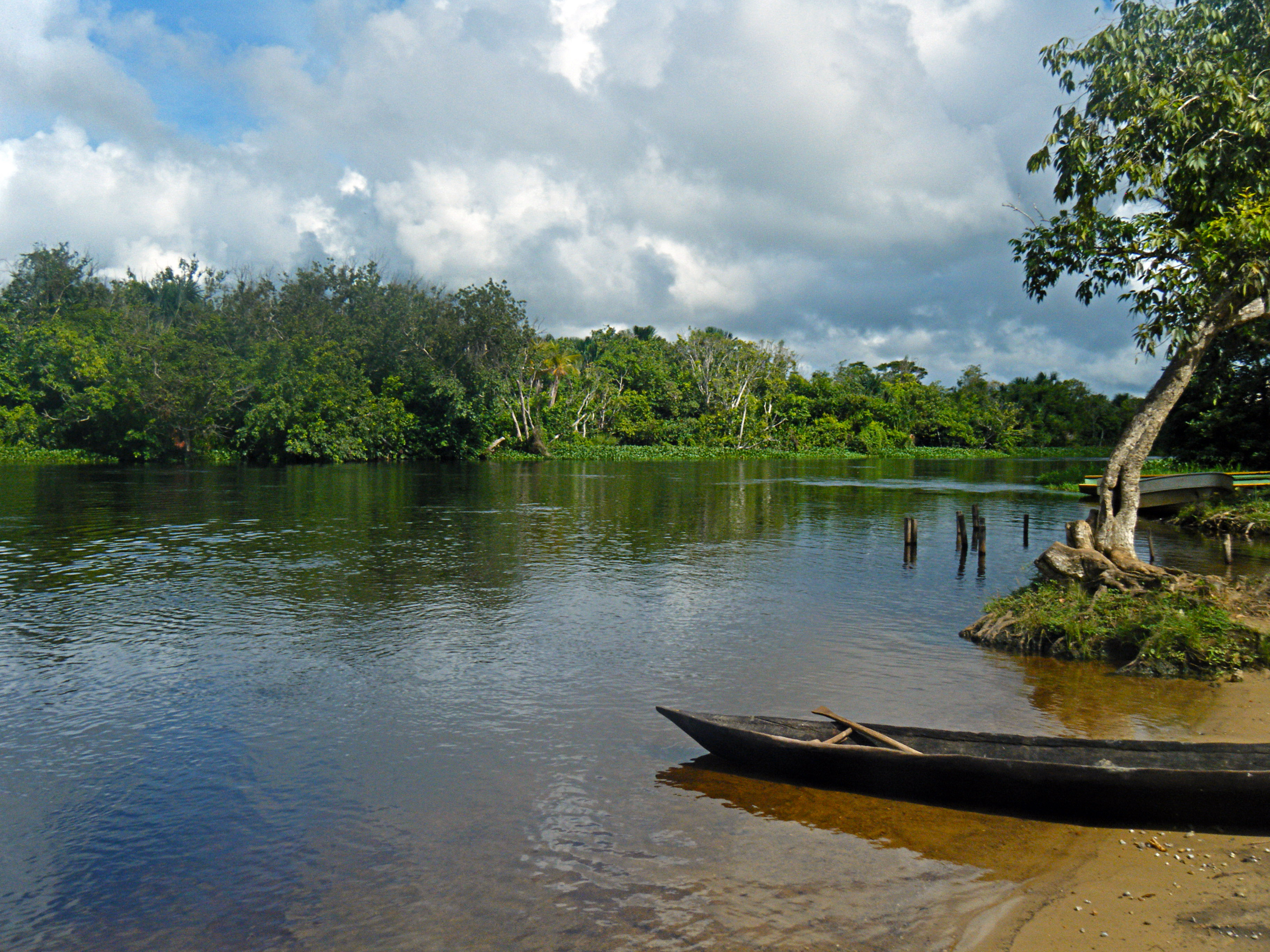
Morichal Largo river.

The rivers of the state belong to one of the two basins that are located in the state, the Atlantic Ocean basin and the Orinoco River basin. Rivers such as the Guanipa, Tigre, Morichal Largo, Caño Mánamo, Amana, Tonoro, Tabasca, and Uracoa flow into the Orinoco River. On the other hand, the Guarapiche, San Juan, Río de Oro, and Caripe rivers flow into the Atlantic Ocean. The rivers of the Atlantic Ocean basin come from the mountains located in the northwest of the state and the rivers of the Orinoco River basin come from the many plateaus located in the southwest of Monagas State and from Anzoategui State.

It has an extensive hydrographic network with a fairly uniform geographical distribution, with the Guarapiche River standing out in the area of the tables. The rivers are numerous and of not much depth, marking the end of the piedmont in which three river basins with a north–south course are located: those of the rivers Amana-Areo, Guarapiche, and Púnceres-Aragua. From west to east the Tácata, Tonoro, Caris, Guanipa and Tigre rivers cross the state. Monagas State has a great number of moderate rivers and streams; among the main ones are:

- Guarapiche River
- Mapirito River
- Tigre River
- Morichal Largo River
- San Juan River

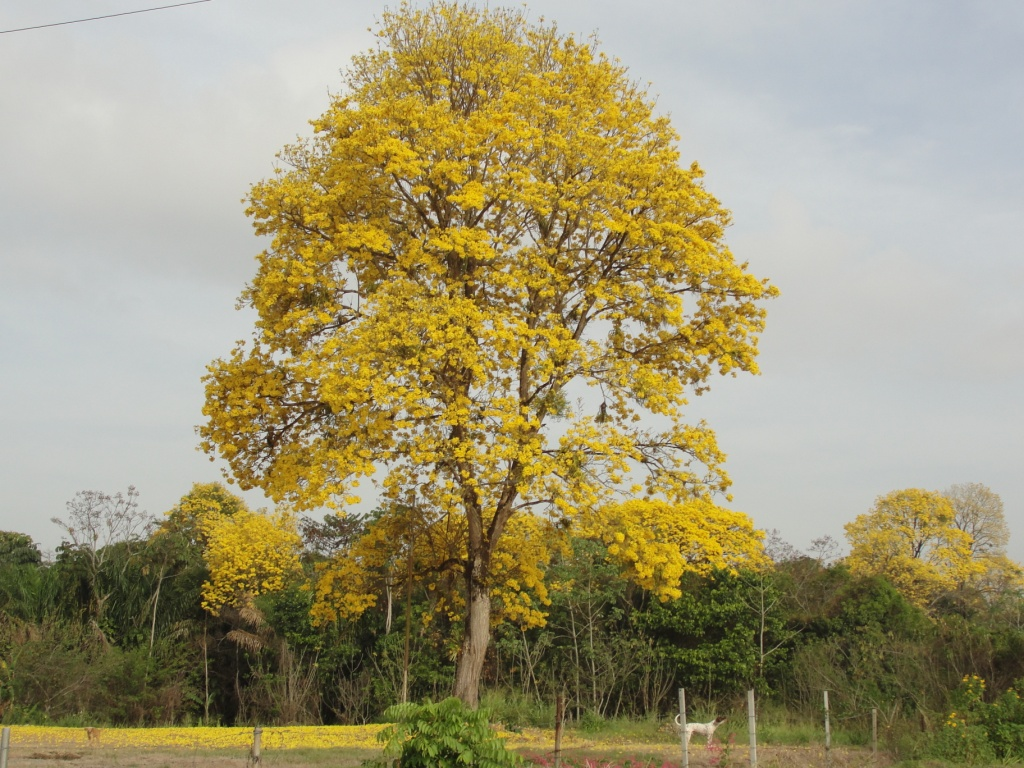
Araguaney, in Monagas, National Tree of Venezuela

=== Vegetation ===
The area's vegetation is intertropical and is adapted to the different altitudes, climates, and kinds of soil in the state. The State of Monagas has an extensive biodiversity compared to other Venezuelan states. More than 2000 species of vascular flora have been catalogued within the Monagas territory. The most symbolic tree in the state is the moriche (Mauritia flexuosa) along the Morichal Largo River. The dominant vegetation type in the north of Monagas State is rainforest, such as that found in the mountainous area of the San Juan River valley and the municipalities of Acosta and Caripe. In these cold areas, it is possible to grow temperate plants such as strawberries and roses. However, in the flat regions, towards the south-east of the state, intertropical savanna vegetation dominates, such as thorny scrub, grasses, cujíes and other varieties that have adapted to the conditions of the state such as Ceiba, jobo, Caribbean pine, jabillo and carob tree. Another variation of the vegetation present in Monagas State can be found along the banks of the main rivers, where extensive forests of mangroves, palms and morichals have formed.

=== Protected areas ===
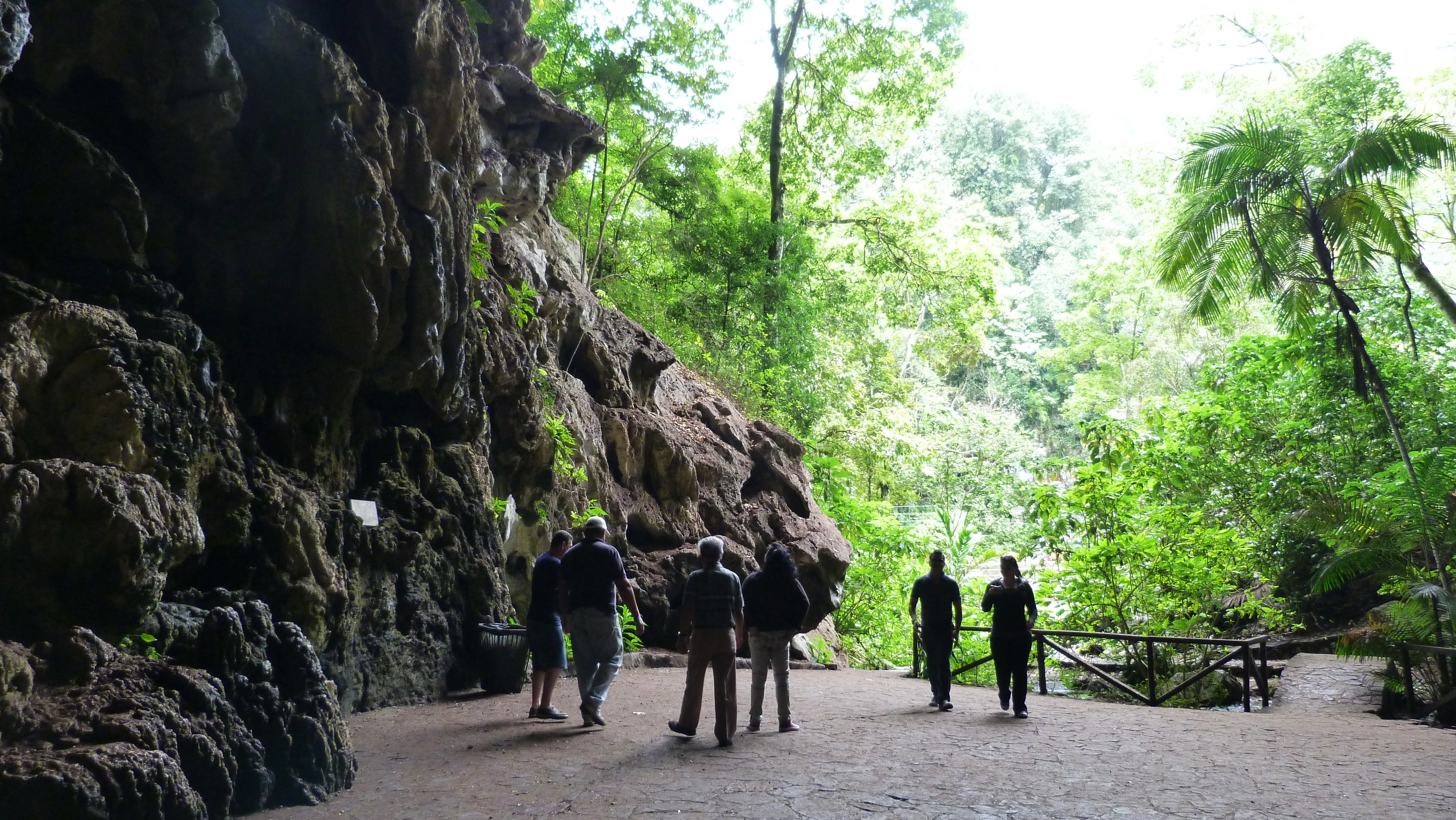
El Guácharo National Park

Cueva del Guácharo National Park was created in May 1975 by the Venezuelan government to protect the ecosystem surrounding the Guácharo Cave. The park has a surface area of 155 km^{2} (60 sq mi) and includes the mountainous areas of the municipalities of Acosta and Caripe in Monagas State and Ribero Municipality in Sucre State.

The Alexander von Humboldt National Monument is located in the park. It was created in 1949 to protect the Guácharo Cave. This national monument is named after the German explorer Alexander von Humboldt, who visited the cave in 1799.

Another protected area is the Guarapiche Forestal Reserve, which protects the forests located along the banks of the Guarapiche and San Juan Rivers.

== Politics and government ==
Like the other 23 federal entities of Venezuela, the state maintains its own police force, which is supported and complemented by the National Police and the Venezuelan National Guard.

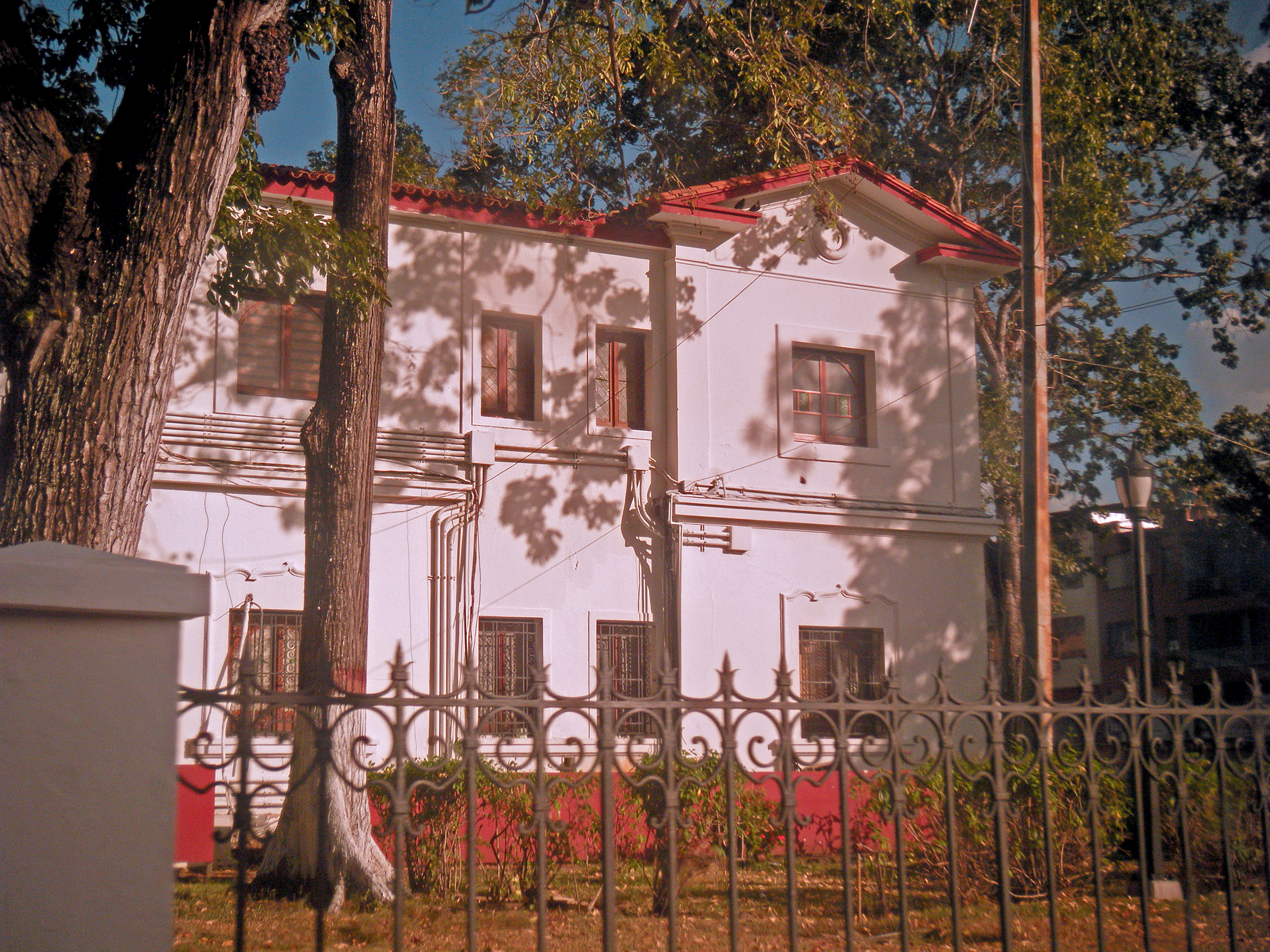
Seat of the government of the State of Monagas (Palacio de Gobierno de Monagas)

Monagas has five branches of government, and is autonomous and equal to the rest of the states of the Federation:

=== Executive branch ===
It is formed by the Governor of Monagas and a cabinet of trusted state secretaries who assist him in the management of the government and are freely appointed and removable officials, an attorney, autonomous institutes and state foundations.

Governors chosen by popular vote

- Guillermo Call (1990–1992); (1993–1995) Acción Democrática
- Luis Eduardo Martínez (1996–1998); (1999–2000) Acción Democrática
- Miguel Gómez (2000) Movimiento Quinta República
- Guillermo Call (2001–2004) Acción Democrática
- José Gregorio Briceño (2004–2008) MIGATO, Movimiento Quinta República; (2009–2012) United Socialist Party of Venezuela
- Yelitza Santaella (2012—2021) United Socialist Party of Venezuela.
- Cosme Arzolay (2021), temporarily
- Ernesto Luna (2021—present) United Socialist Party of Venezuela.

=== Legislative branch ===
It consists of a unicameral parliament called the Legislative Council of the State of Monagas, which is responsible for approving the regional budget, passing state laws and supervising the administration of the state governor.

=== Judicial branch ===
It depends on the judiciary at the national level organized through the Judicial District of the State of Monagas.

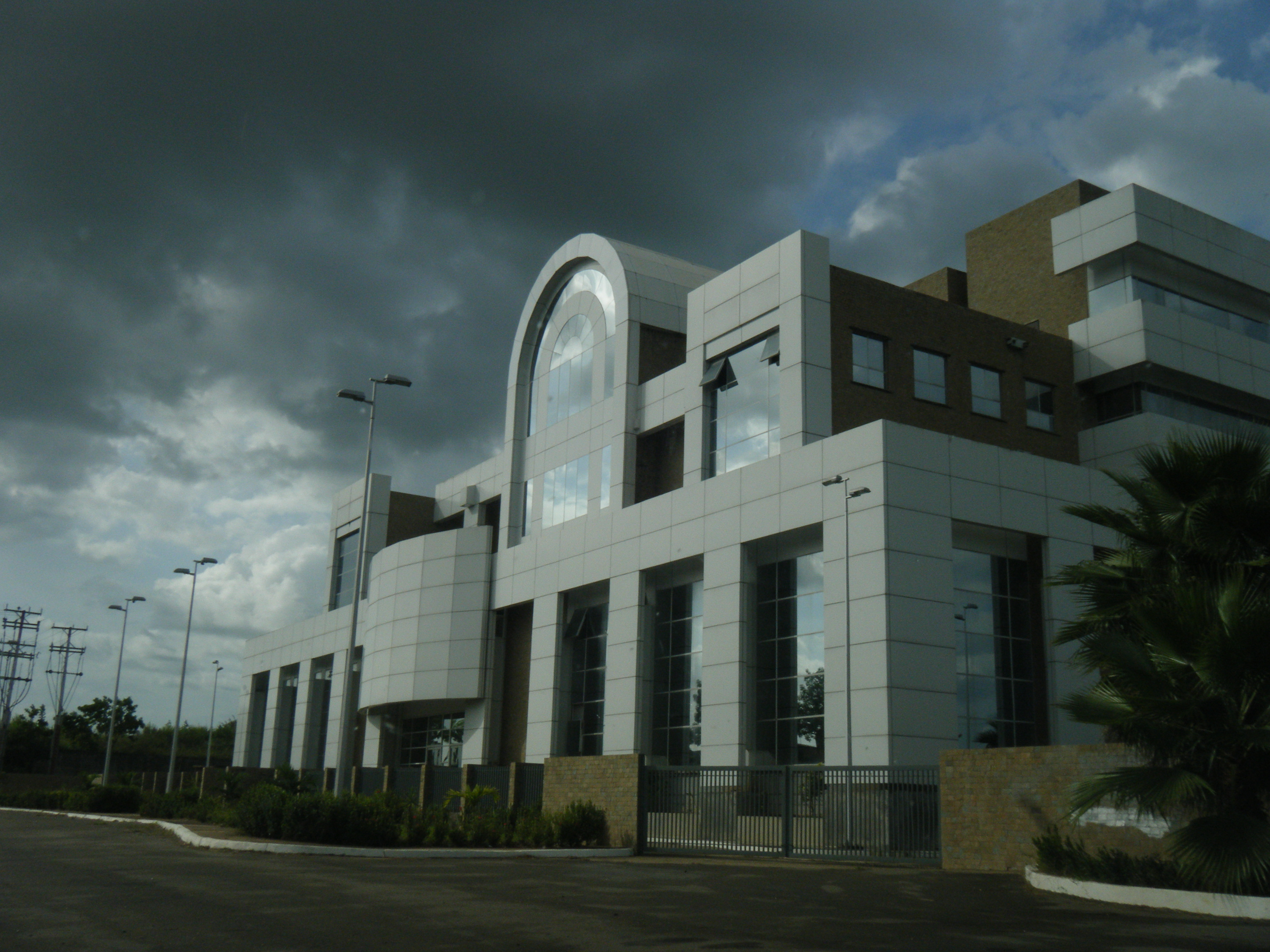
Maturin Palace of Justice (Palacio de Justicia de Maturín)

=== City branch ===
Formed by the State Ethics Council and the State Comptroller General's Office, the latter is responsible for overseeing the proper use of the resources available to the regional government.

=== Electoral branch ===
It reports to the National Electoral Council at the national level which organizes the region through the so-called Main Electoral Board of the State of Monagas.

=== State constitution ===
Monagas is organized on the basis of the Constitution of the State of Monagas, adopted by the Legislative Council on 21 March 2002.

== Municipalities and municipal seats ==
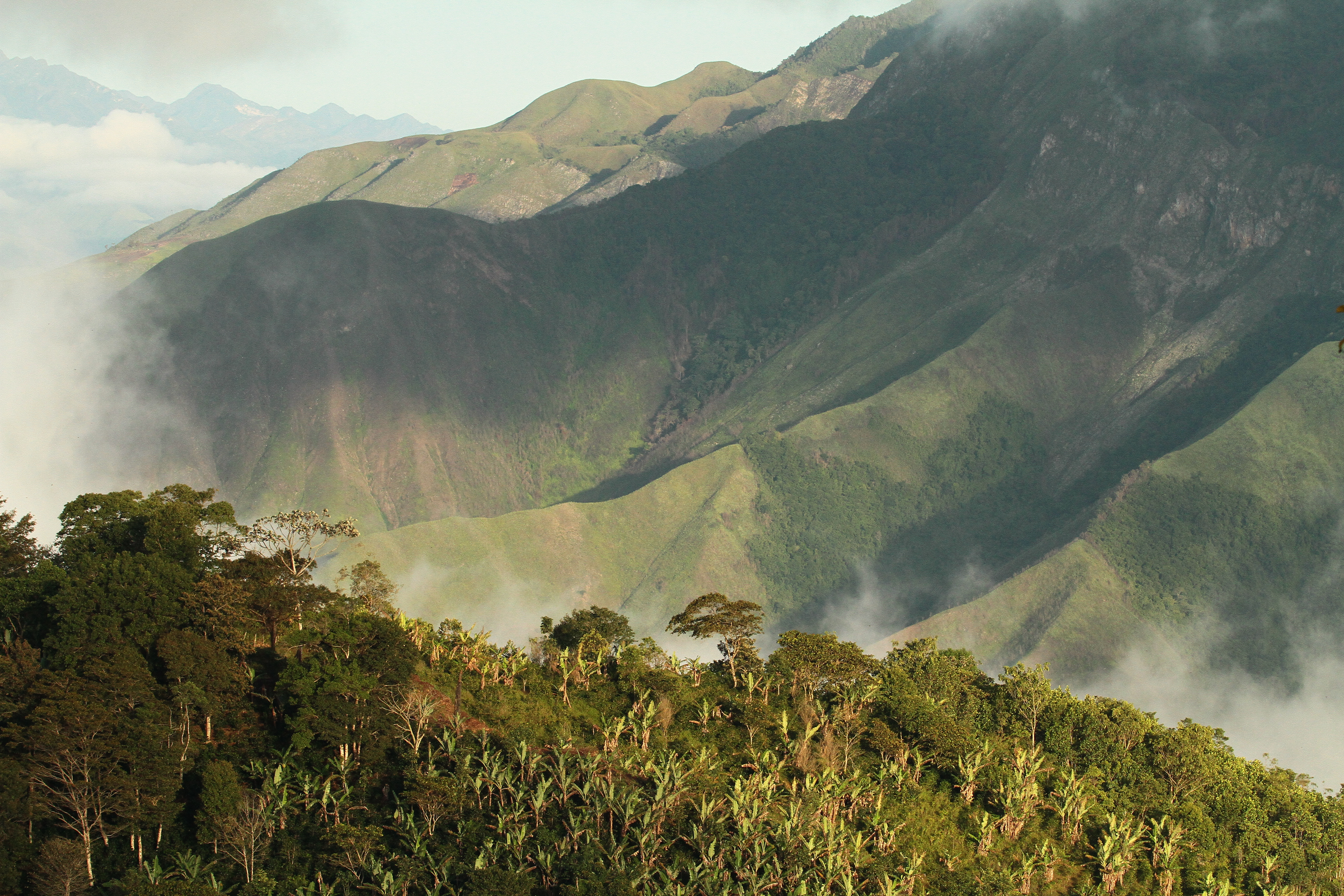
Cerro Perú, Caripe Municipality

1. Acosta (San Antonio de Capayacuar)
2. Aguasay (Aguasay)
3. Bolívar (Caripito)
4. Caripe (Caripe)
5. Cedeño (Caicara de Maturín)
6. Ezequiel Zamora (Punta de Mata)
7. Libertador (Temblador)
8. Maturín (Maturín)
9. Piar (Aragua de Maturín)
10. Punceres (Quiriquire)
11. Santa Bárbara (Santa Bárbara)
12. Sotillo (Barrancas del Orinoco)
13. Uracoa (Uracoa)

== Demographics ==
Historical population
| Year | Pop. | ±% p.a. |
|---|---|---|
| 1873 | 47,863 | — |
| 1881 | 55,580 | +1.89% |
| 1891 | 74,503 | +2.97% |
| 1920 | 62,421 | −0.61% |
| 1926 | 67,533 | +1.32% |
| 1936 | 92,885 | +3.24% |
| 1941 | 122,901 | +5.76% |
| 1950 | 175,560 | +4.04% |
| 1961 | 246,217 | +3.12% |
| 1971 | 298,239 | +1.94% |
| 1981 | 388,536 | +2.68% |
| 1990 | 470,157 | +2.14% |
| 2001 | 712,626 | +3.85% |
| 2011 | 905,443 | +2.42% |
Source: "XIV CENSO NACIONAL DE POBLACIÓN Y VIVIENDA - Resultados por Entidad Federal y Municipio del Estado Monagas" (PDF). Instituto Nacional de Estadística.

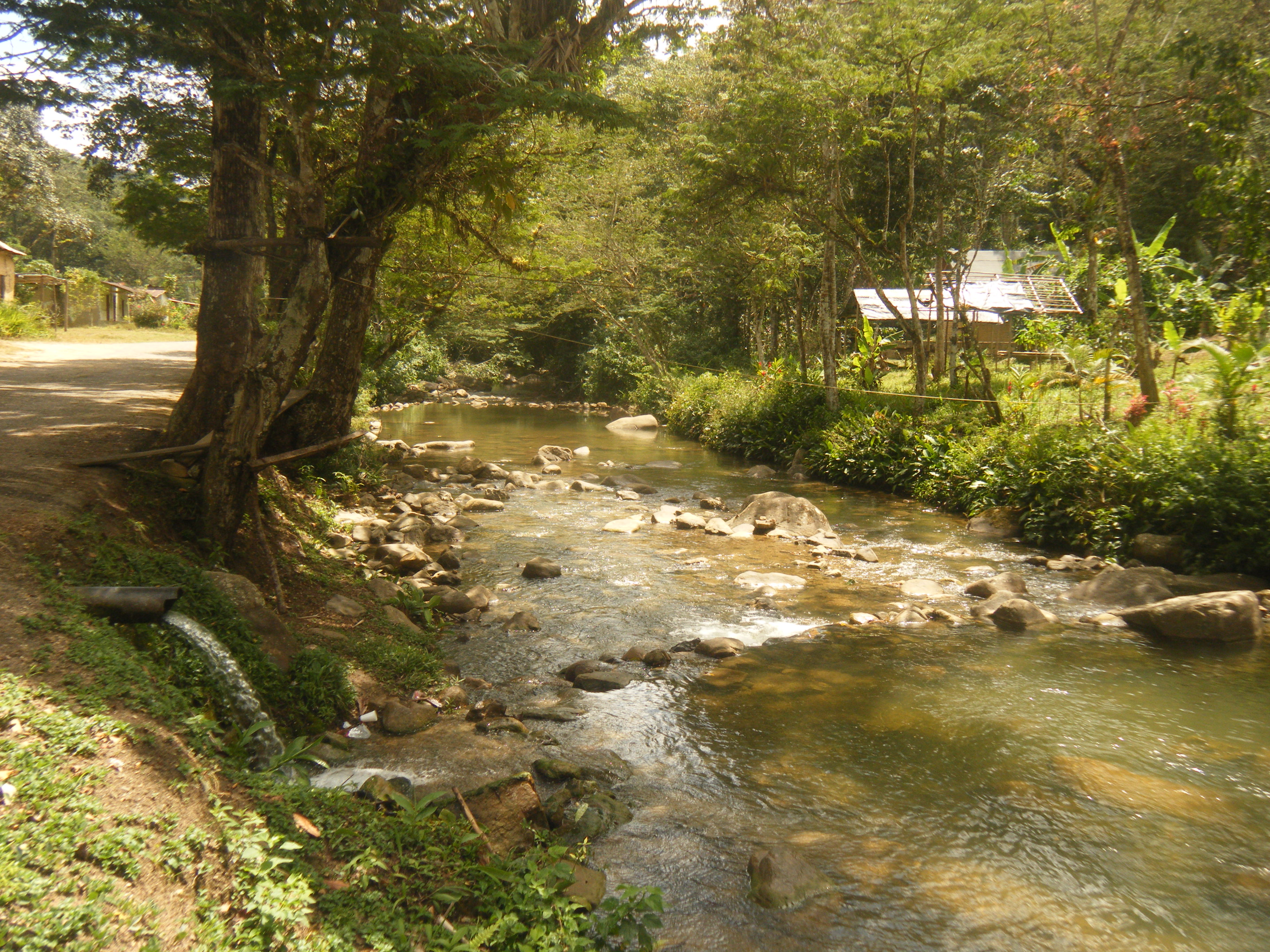
Colorado River, Caripe Municipality

The population of Monagas State has increased since the 1920s due to the opening of its oil fields. The majority of its inhabitants are Mestizo; that is, they result from the progeny of native Indians, Black Africans and White Europeans. Many people from neighbouring states as Sucre and Nueva Esparta, as well as persons from other countries as Spaniards, Italians, Portuguese, Syrian, Lebanese and Chinese have immigrated to the state because of the petroleum industry and business opportunities. The majority of the population is concentrated in the northern area of Monagas state. At least fifty percent of inhabitants live in the capital state of Maturín. The most populated cities are Maturín (514,046), Punta de Mata (69,000), Caripe (37,350), Caripito (52,000) and Temblador (36,000).

Monagas also has inhabitants of the Warao and Kariña ethnic groups.

=== Race and ethnicity ===
According to the 2011 Census, the racial composition of the population was:

| Racial composition | Population | % |
|---|---|---|
| Mestizo | —N/a | 54.8 |
| White | 359,473 | 38.8 |
| Black | 42,618 | 4.6 |
| Other race | —N/a | 1.8 |

== Economy ==
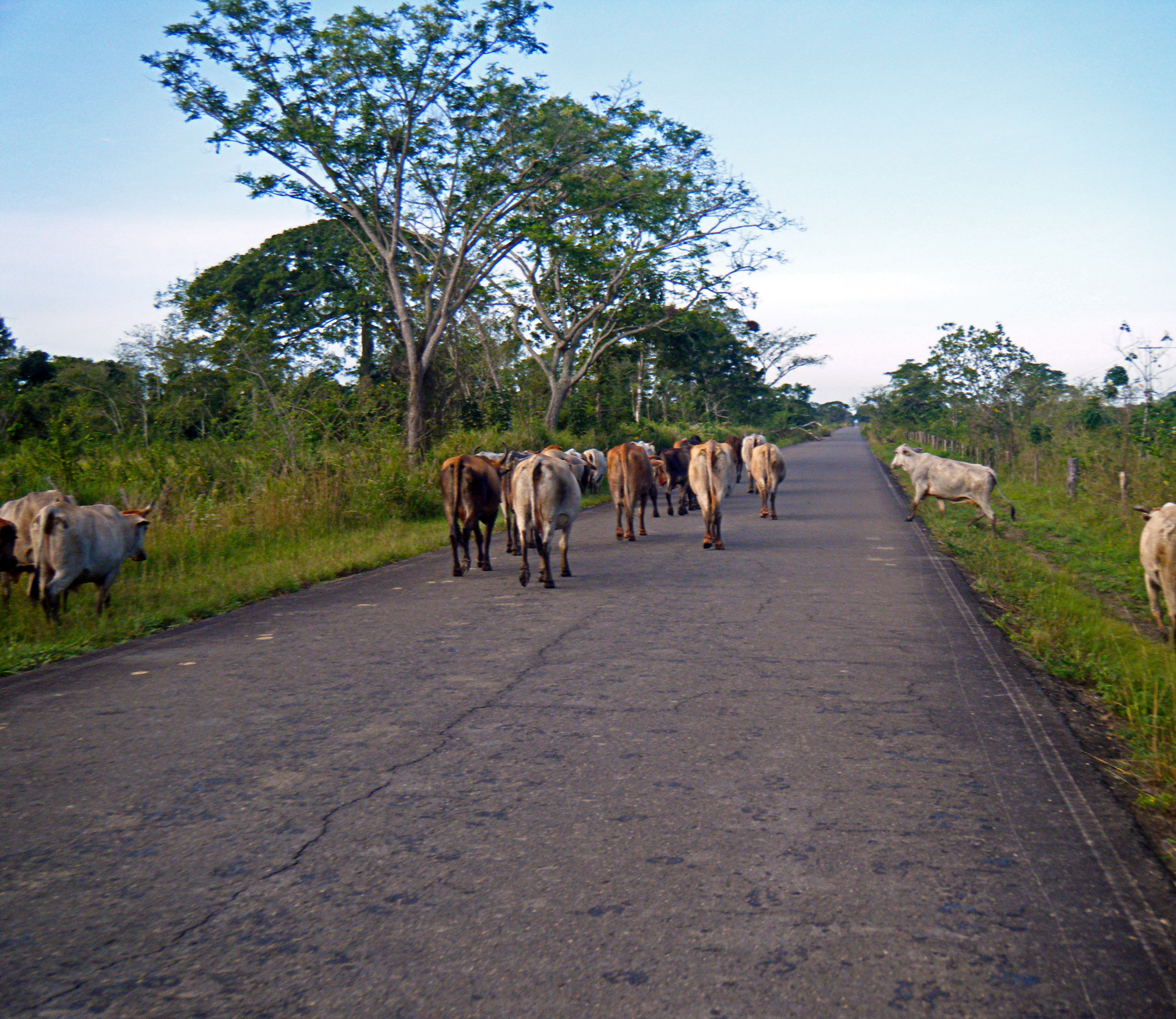
Agriculture in Monagas.

The main economical activity is the exploitation of oil. Many towns such as Punta de Mata, El Tejero, and Temblador depend on this activity.

Other towns such as Caripe and San Antonio live off agriculture and livestock farming. Coffee is planted in the areas next to the towns of Caripe and San Antonio. Cocoa is cultivated near Caripito. Maize, tomato, sugar-cane, tobacco, banana, rice, yucca and tropical fruits grow in other areas.

Cattle is concentrated in the southern and western parts of Monagas, where there are great extensions of savannas and plateaus.

The state has forests with its corresponding industry.

Because of the oil exploitation Maturín is a main commercial and banking centre in the east of Venezuela.

== Tourism ==
=== Natural heritage ===
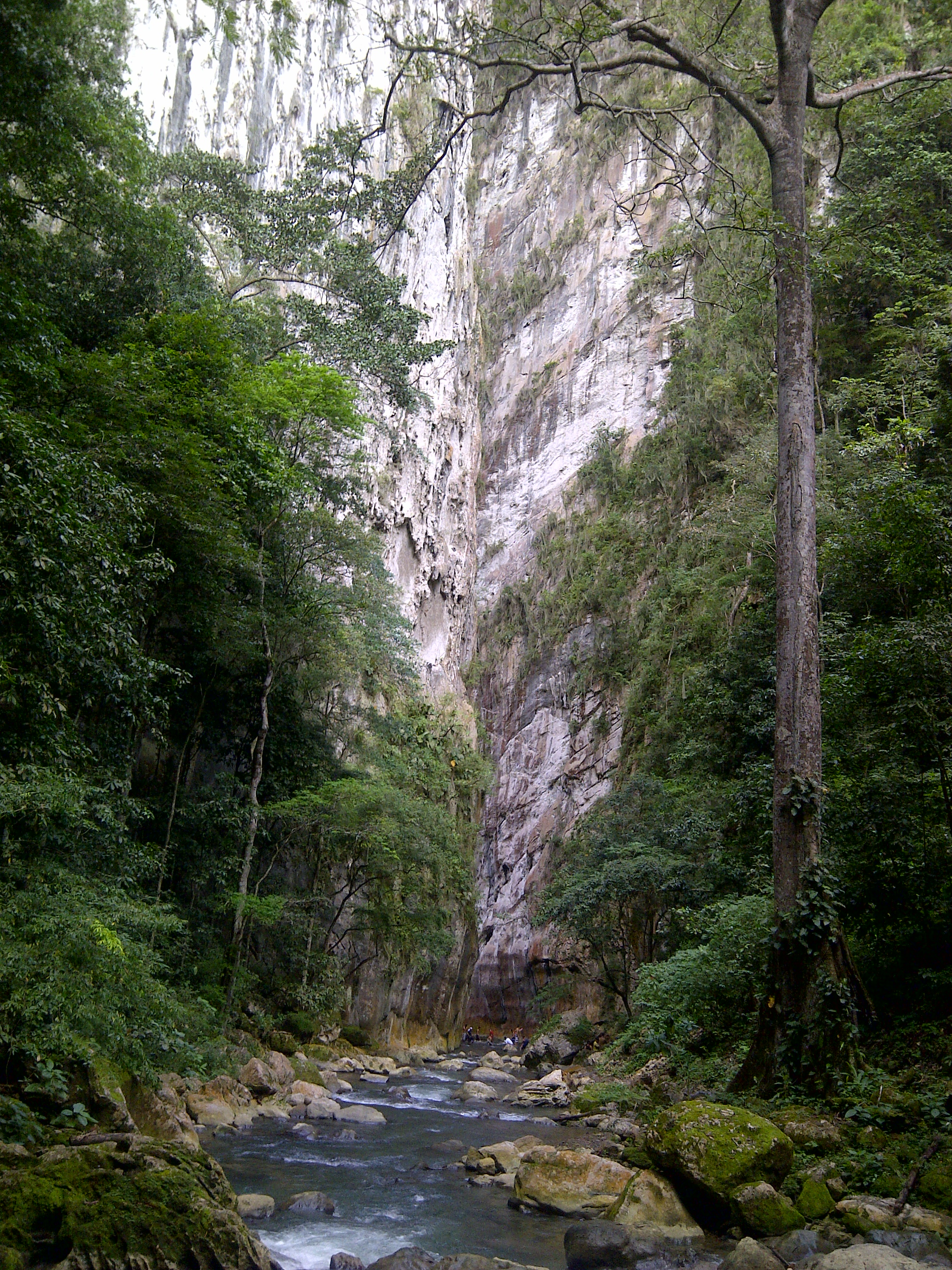
Las Puertas de Miraflores.

- Cueva del Guacharo National Park is the most important natural heritage of the Monagas State visited by natives and foreigners
- Puertas de Miraflores: also called Puertas del Guarapiche, it is a gorge or canyon where the Guarapiche river begins. It is formed by two rocky walls 100 m (330 ft) high.
- El Guamo Dam: contains the waters of the Guarapiche, Colorado, Cocollar and other rivers. It is built over the ruins of the towns of San Francisco, Cachimbo and Colorado. It has a park.

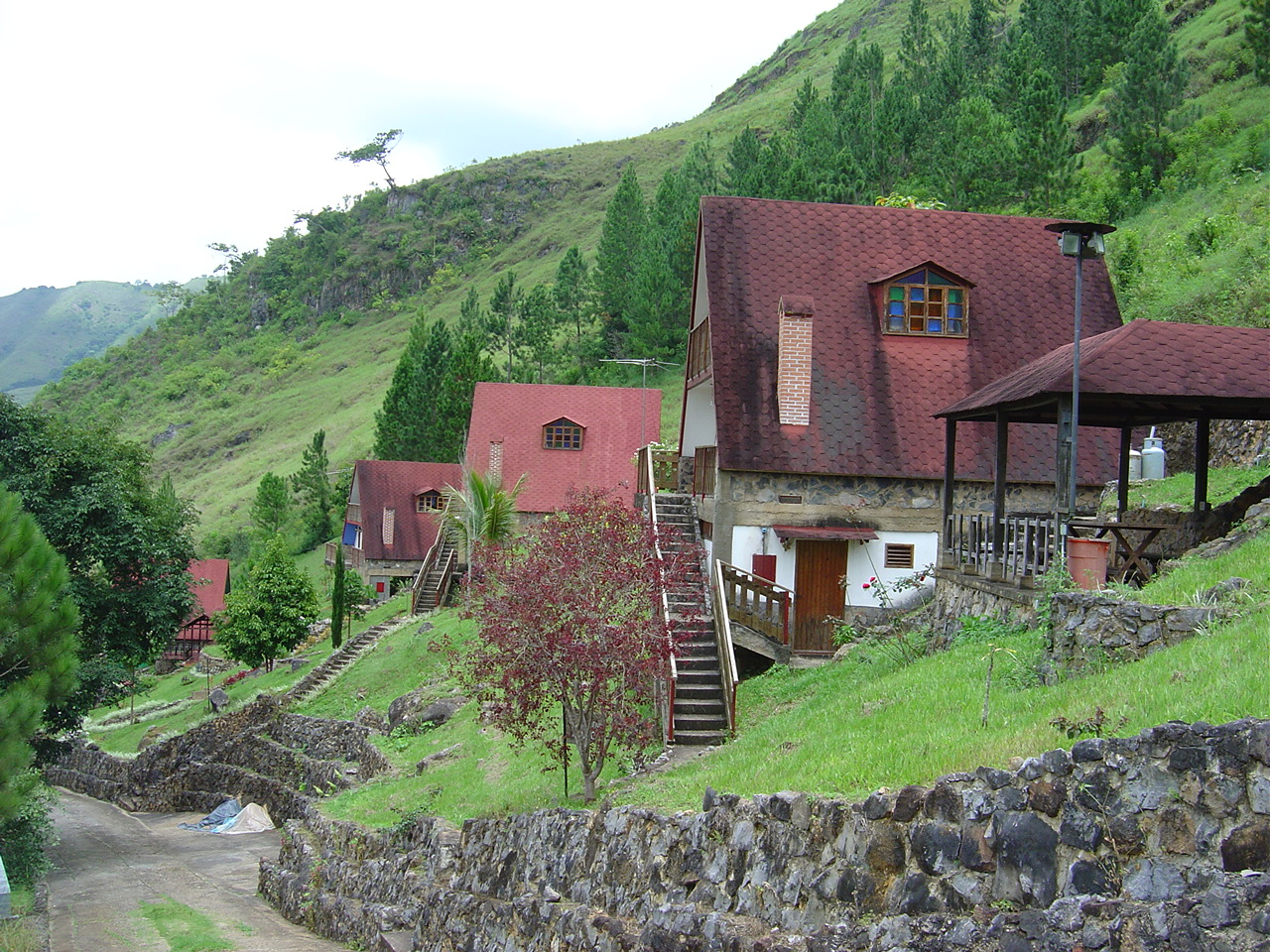
Caripe.

- Spa Miraflores: its waters come from the Guarapiche river and has temperatures that oscillate between 18 and 26 °C (64 and 79 °F). It has a road leading travelers to the Gates of Miraflores.
- La Bomba de Caripito Spa in the La Tubería sector.
- Río Selva Spa, a natural space with crystalline waters provided by the waters of the Tabasca and Uracoa Rivers. Located in the town of Tabasca, it has accommodation facilities, bathrooms, air conditioning, restaurant, swimming pool with natural water from morichales, kiosks with grills and dressing rooms.
- Poza de Azufre: located in the Los Morros Sector, this busy space is suitable for health tourism because of the healing properties of the pool, formed by the spring with a high content of copper and sulfur. It has a temperature of approximately 69 °C (156 °F).
- Cascada el Nazareno: in the middle of a tropical forest, there is a waterfall of more than 50 meters high on an immense rock. It is also known as the poza el nazareno.
- Morichal Largo River: it is formed by deltaic plains and forests of galleries that border its margins. The predominant plant species in this rainforest is the moriche tree, whose roots penetrate deep into the underground water reserves, giving rise to the springs that feed the flow of the rivers in the region.
- Yagrumito Volcano: it is a mud volcano located 6 km (3.7 mi) southeast of the city of Maturin, is about 2 or 3 m (6 ft 7 in or 9 ft 10 in) in relative height and occupies about 2,000 m^{2} (22,000 sq ft), including mud pools and mudflats without vegetation, although the cone alone should not exceed about 400 m^{2} (4,300 sq ft). The crater opening is approximately 50 cm (20 in) in diameter.

=== Built heritage ===
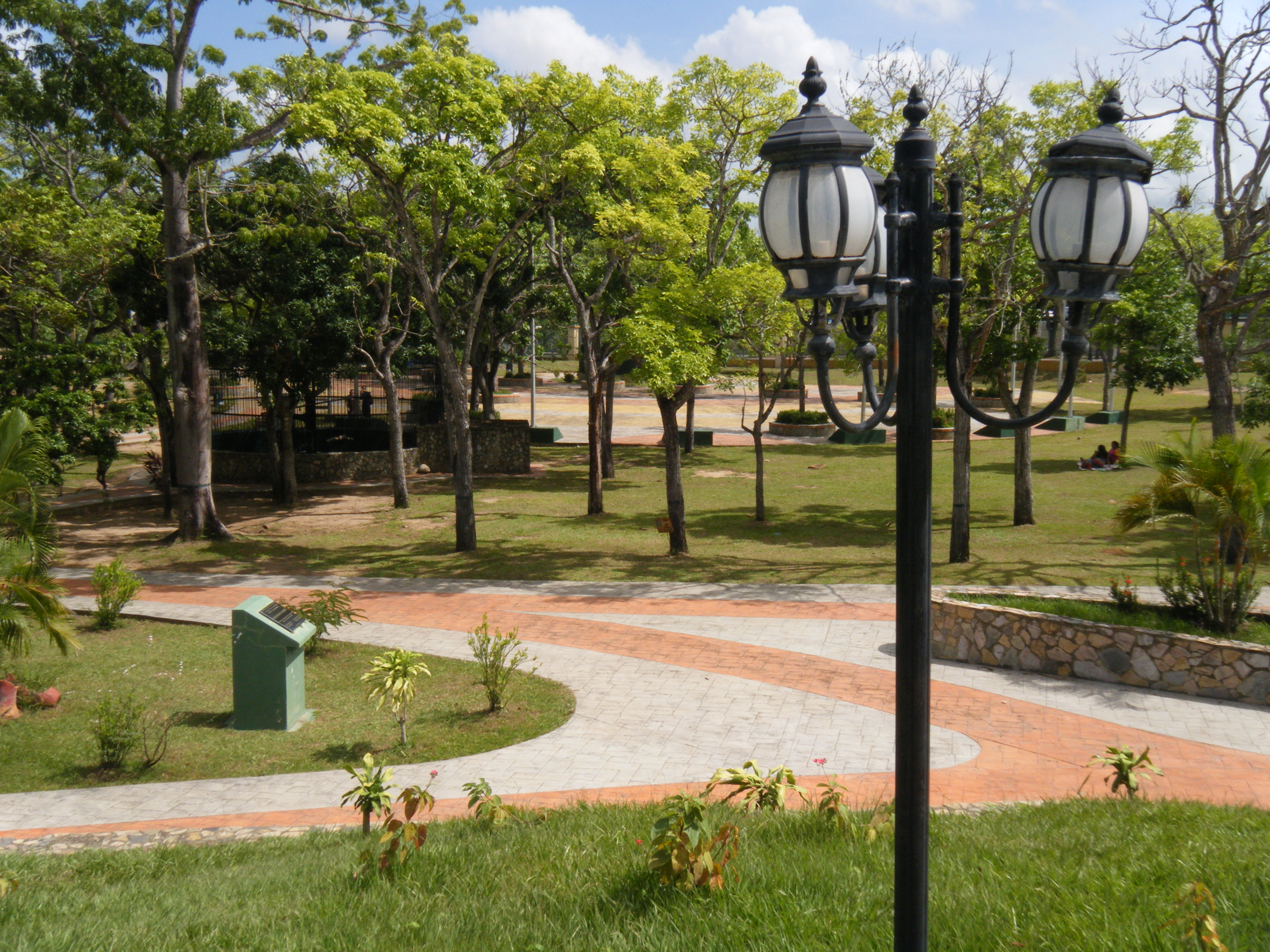
La Guaricha Zoo

- Our Lady of Mount Carmel Cathedral: a Romanesque-style Catholic church, it is located between Bolivar Avenue and Monagas Street. It was inaugurated in 1981 and is considered one of the most modern cathedrals in Latin America. It has stained glass windows that adorn its interior.
- San Simón de Maturín Church: it is the oldest Catholic church in Maturín. It was built between 1884 and 1887. It is of neo-Gothic style, with pointed arches. It has a central tower on the façade. It is located on Rojas Street, in front of Bolívar Square.
- Church of San Francisco de Guayareguar: is located near the El Guamo Dam.
- William H. Phelps Public Library: inaugurated on 5 September 1948. It was built and donated by William H. Phelps Sr.
- Mural of the Foundation of San Antonio de Capayacuar: erected in 1987, it is located at the entrance of San Antonio.
- Church of San Antonio de Padua de San Antonio de Maturín.
- El Playon – Community "Culantrillar" Parish San Antonio (Acosta)
- Sagrado Corazón de Jesús Church, Caripito: it is the main Catholic church, built in 1936.

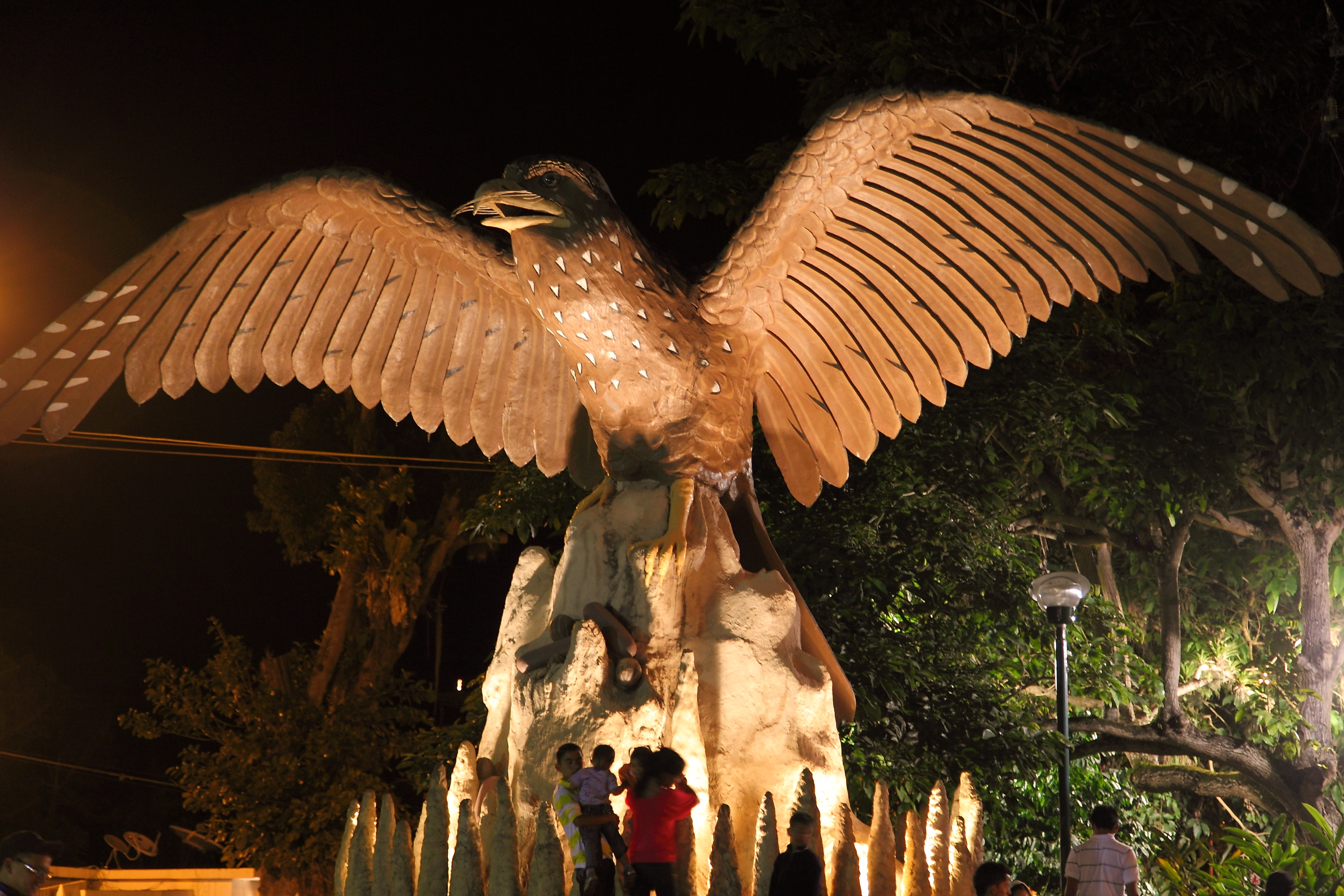
Guacharo Monument

- Casa de la Cultura Juvenal Ravelo de Caripito: it is a cultural house inaugurated in 1974. It has an auditorium, an exhibition hall, dressing rooms, a conference room, a library, multipurpose rooms and an internal recreational square. It is located in the El Bajo sector, Boyacá Avenue. It is named in honor of Juvenal Ravelo, a native artist from Caripito.
- Monument to the Nazarene: built in 2.05 with cement, rods, and galvanized steel mesh by sculptor Jesus David Martinez, it consists of an image of the Nazarene, 20 m (66 ft) high, carrying his cross on a slope and dressed in a purple tunic with gold trimmings.
- Caripito religious museum: it houses life-size images and other religious objects.
- Hacienda Sarrapial: typical house of the time of the agrarian Venezuela. It is the headquarters of the Monaguense Tourism Corporation. It is located on Alirio Ugarte Pelayo Avenue, on the Boquerón hill.
- Uyapari Museum: Anthropological museum founded in 1984, on the old seat of the National School Uriapara, in front of the Plaza Bolívar. It is the most important center for the diffusion of the Barrancoid culture, the oldest in Venezuela, highlighting the scientific work for the rescue of the archaeological heritage, such as workshops for the manufacture of replicas of original Barrancoid pieces.
- Church of San Rafael Arcángel de (Barrancas del Orinoco): Catholic church originally built in Bahareque style in 1790 by Friar Joaquín de Morata. It was rebuilt in 1931 with a cement structure and in 1984 it was the object of an expansion process that culminated in 1987. The original façade was kept, although it was reinforced to accommodate a capacity of 3,000 people.

=== Parks ===
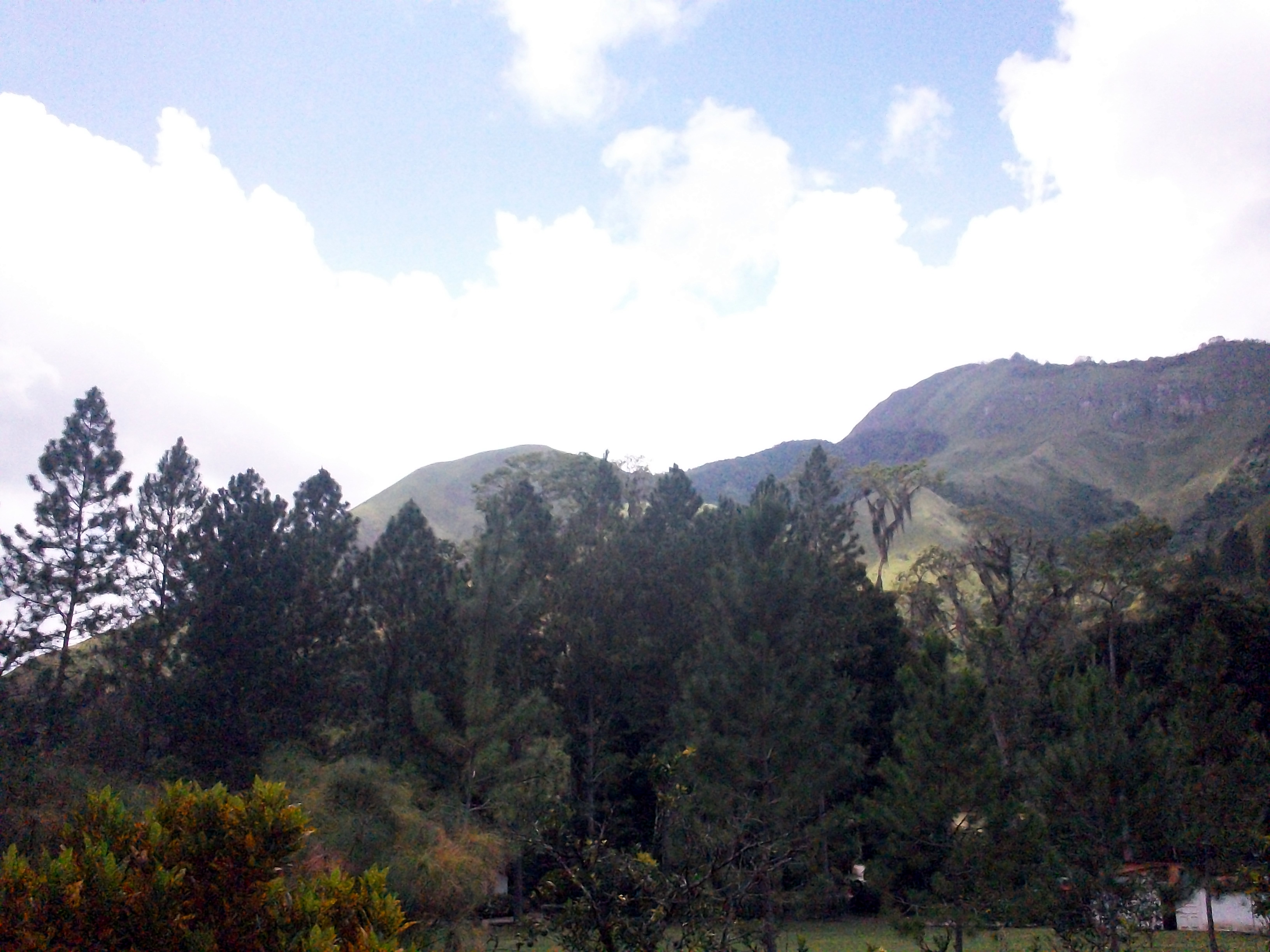
Monagas State has many green areas and public parks

- Andrés Eloy Blanco Park: located on the southern road.
- Parque del Este: located in La Floresta.
- La Guaricha Zoo: located on Raúl Leoni Avenue, near the old terminal of the José Tadeo Monagas International Airport.
- Bolívar Recreational Park: located in the Los Guaritos sector.
- Parque Menca de Leoni: located on Juncal Avenue.
- Padilla Ron Park: located in the Las Cocuizas sector.
- Rómulo Betancourt Park: located on Universidad Avenue.

== Education ==
At university level Monagas State has the following public university institutes:

Caripe

- Universidad Nacional Abierta (UNA).

Caripito

- Universidad Nacional Abierta (UNA).
- Instituto Universitario Tecnológico de Caripito.

Maturín

- Universidad de Oriente, Núcleo Monagas (UDO-Monagas).
- Universidad Bolivariana de Venezuela (UBV).
- Universidad Pedagógica Experimenta Libertador – Instituto Pedagógico de Maturín (UPEL-IPM).
- Universidad Nacional Abierta (UNA).
- Universidad Nacional Experimental Simón Rodríguez (UNESR).

San Antonio

- Núcleo del Instituto Pedagógico de Maturín (UPEL-IPM), was created on 28 July 1983, by Decree No. 2176 of President Campins. The existing public pedagogical institutes in Venezuela (Barquisimeto, Caracas, Maracay and Maturín), which operated autonomously, were integrated into the UPEL as nuclei by Resolution No. 22 dated 28 January 1988.

And these private university institutes:

Caripe

- Instituto Universitario Pedagógico Monseñor Arias Blanco

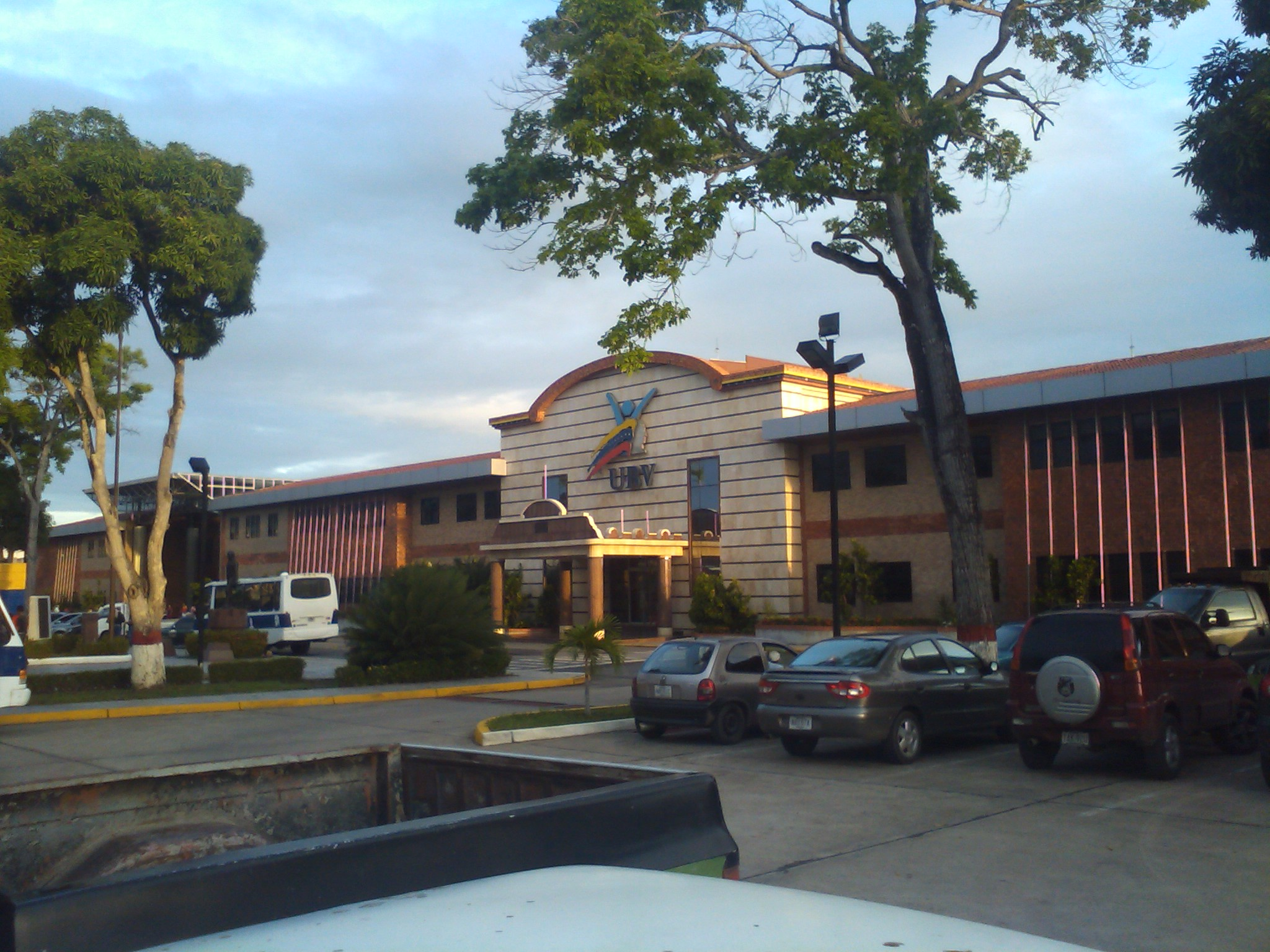
Bolivarian University, Monagas State

Maturín

- Universidad Gran Mariscal de Ayacucho (UGMA). Only postgraduate studies.
- Universidad Cecilio Acosta (UNICA). Only postgraduate studies.
- Universidad de Margarita (UNIMAR)
- Universidad Santa María (USM)
- Instituto Politécnico Santiago Mariño (IUPSM)
- Instituto Universitario de Tecnología Industrial Rodolfo Loreto Arismendi (IUTIRLA)
- Instituto Universitario de Tecnología Venezuela (IUTV)

Punta de Mata

- Instituto Universitario de Tecnología de Cumaná (IUTC)
- Universidad Nacional Abierta (UNA)

Piar

- UNEFA

Temblador

- Universidad Nacional Abierta (Unidad de Apoyo Temblador)
- Universidad Territorial Deltaica Francisco Tamayo (Programa Temblador)

== Culture ==
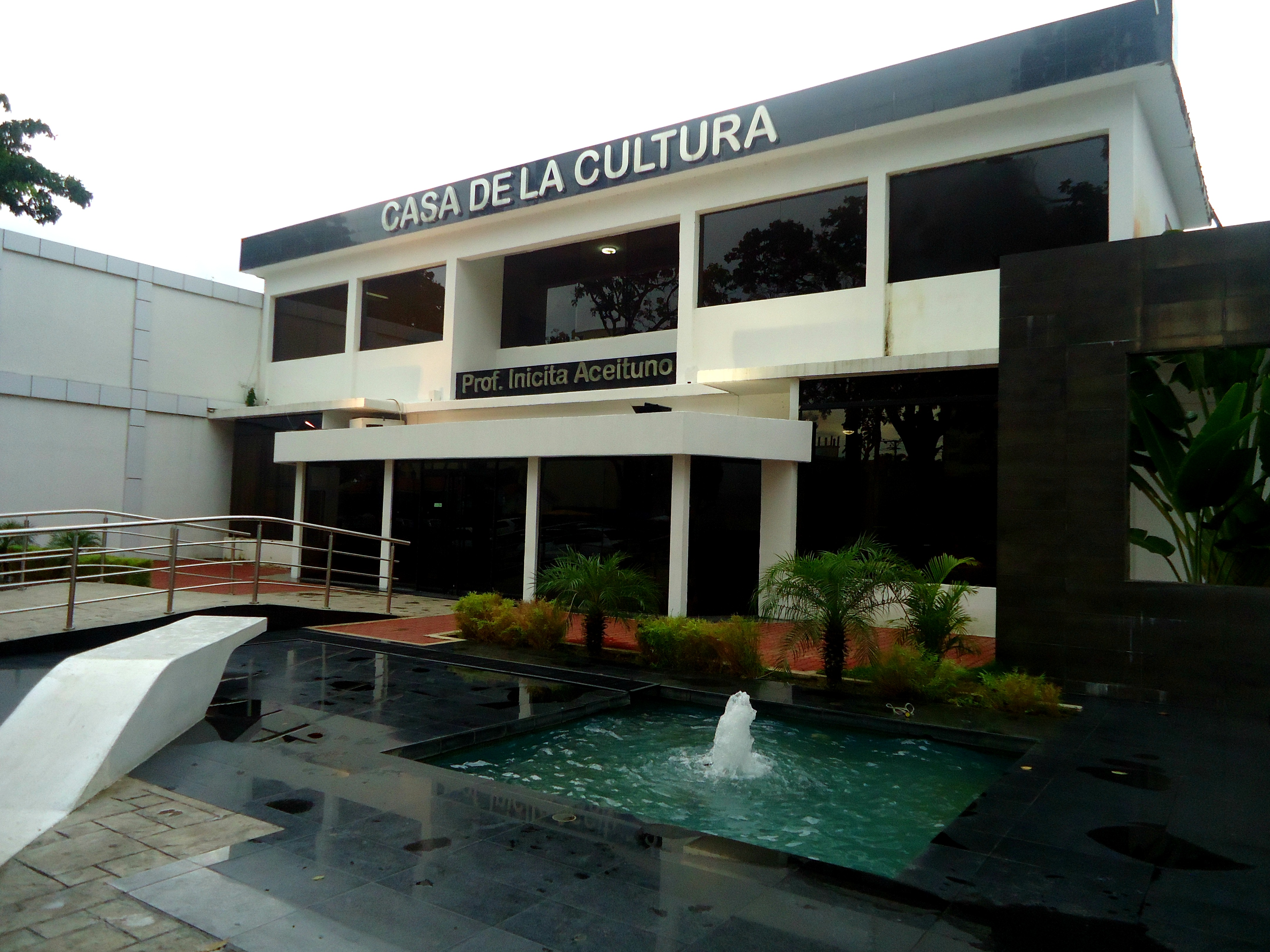
Culture House in Maturín, Monagas State

Monagas state has a culture very similar to other eastern states of Venezuela. Natives of Monagas share with the population of the eastern states the quick manner of speaking the Spanish language, food, some musical rhythms as the galerón or joropo, typical clothing such as the liqui liqui of the Llanos, and veneration of the Virgin of El Valle.

=== Festivals ===
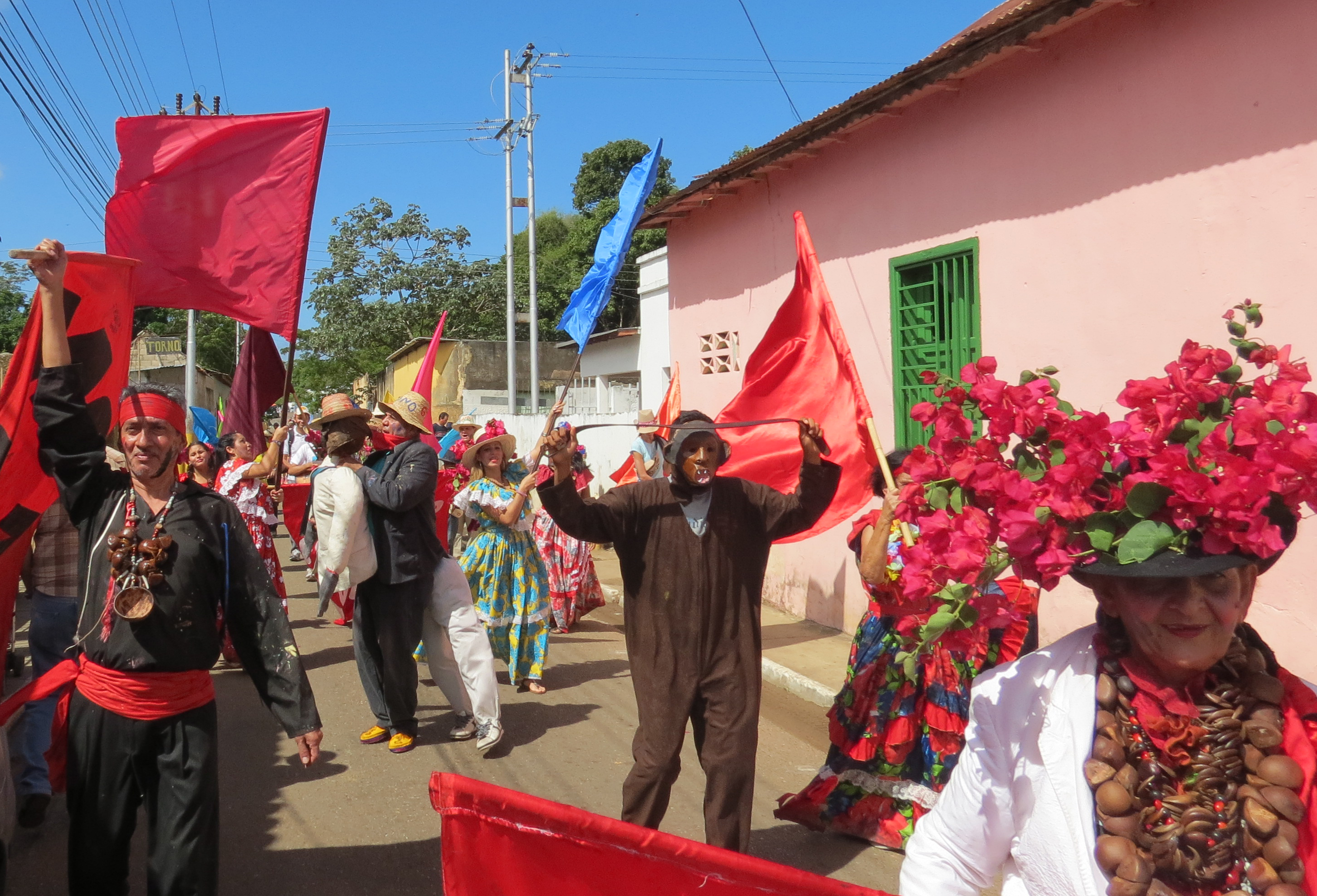
Fiesta del Mono, Monagas State

The Maturín Carnival is highlighted by the parade in the center of the city, with floats and parades made by communities, educational institutions, public agencies and private companies. After the parade, musical shows are held at the local sports complex, in addition to the ceremony of electing the Carnival Queen.

The Festival of the Virgin of the Valley is celebrated in September. Processions with the image of the Virgin of the Valley take place in several areas of the city.

The Saint Simon (San Simón) Fair is held to celebrate the anniversary of the city's foundation. It takes place in the first week of December. Shows such as dances, food exhibitions, horse shows, coleo, musical group presentations, agricultural and handicraft exhibitions are held. It takes place in the Chucho Palacios Fair Complex. It is named after Saint Simon in honour of Simon the Zealot, the patron saint of Maturín.

The event of the burning of Judas takes place on Easter Sunday, where an effigy is lit on fire. In recent years these effigies have been personalized by contemporary politicians.

The Snake of Ipure (culebra de Ipure) is a typical dance in San Antonio de Capayacuar and widespread in the State of Monagas, where girls or women dressed usually in yellow and black dance in the form of the movement of a snake.

=== Dance ===
The Genarito Bull Dance is a festivity featuring several pairs of dancers, a bull, a veterinarian, a nurse, a bullfighter and musicians. The song of the Bull of Genarito is performed by Juliocesar Aguilera Simoza, a native of the town of Aguasay.

The Monkey Dance is an indigenous dance in which people hold each other by the waist, one after the other, and form lines. Guided by someone disguised as a monkey, participants walk through the streets in the manner of a human train to the Monkey Plaza. Beforehand, most of the dancers darken their faces with indigo and soot and dye their clothes with colours. They also play with water, paint, flour, Chilean blue crocus (azulillo) and soot in a carnival-like manner. The monkey then invites those present to join the ritual; if they do not, the monkey will give a light slap to those who refuse. It is celebrated every year on 28 December.

The Dance of the Trembler was first performed on 15 November 1989. It consists of dancing with a temblador (a fish, the electric eel, found in the rivers closest to the town) made of cardboard and cloth. Three people go inside the temblador and three pairs go around it. The instruments used for this dance are a bandolín, cuatro, a drum and maracas.

=== Handicrafts ===
==== Curagua weaving ====
The town of Aguasay is known for its weaving that is made from a plant grown in the town, called curagua. On 2 December 2015, Venezuelan curagua fiber and weaving was declared an Intangible Cultural Heritage of Humanity by UNESCO at its annual meeting in Windhoek, the capital of Namibia.

==== Moriche hammock ====
This art consists of carefully weaving the fiber of the moriche palm. Once it is salcochada and spun, this fiber is tied to special sticks and woven between them, giving it the shape of a sheet; when loops are made at the ends, it takes the form of a hammock.

==== Sangrito ====
The name sangrito is due to the fact that the raw material used for this handicraft is extracted from the roots of a tree that bears its name because when it is cut, its roots tend to bleed; it is easy to mould as it is a very soft and light wood. The Warao Indians use this material to mold figures of animals that live in the forests and rivers that they frequent.

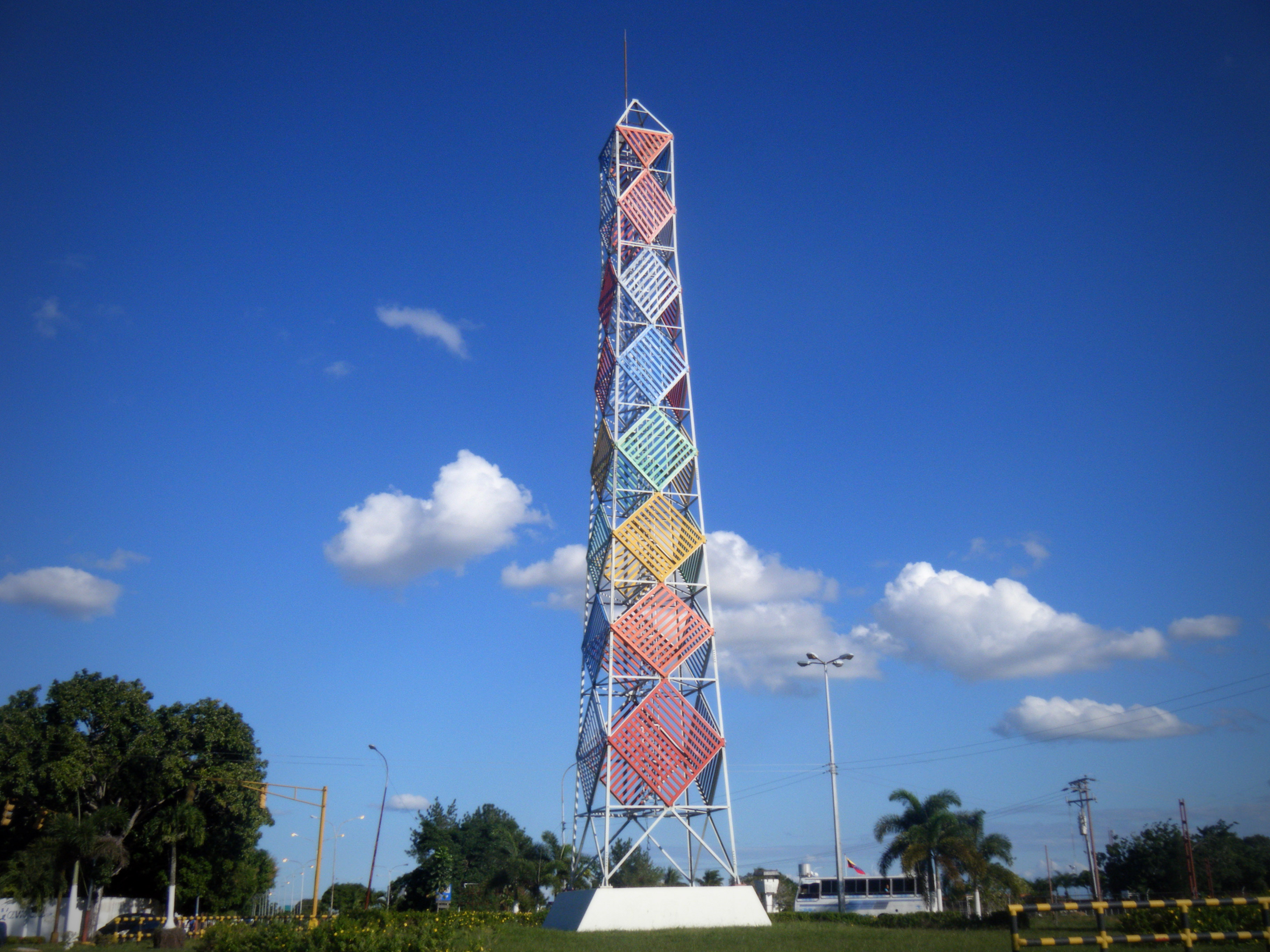
Lumino-Chromatic Space Tower

==== Warao craftsmanship ====
Produced by the Warao Indians, according to the use given to the object, without being separated from the work element. The raw material is plant fibers, mostly moriche and sangrito wood, with which they carve figures and animals, as well as making necklaces with peonies, Mucuna seeds and Job's tears, among other materials. In addition, they construct harpoons, buoys, shields, arrows, candles, roofs, ropes, pitchforks and bridges. The craftsmanship of the Warao reflects their organizational idiosyncrasy, as well as their world: nature, spirit, man.

==== Barrancoide craftsmanship ====
Its main material is clay, which after being molded is baked and painted and used for making dolls, vases, façades of houses, and other things. The items are taken to market and can be found in different parts of the state.

=== Cuisine ===
Typical dishes of Monagas state are arepa (a kind of bread made of maize), cachapa (an omelette made of maize), casabe, empanada, mondongo (a kind of soup), queso de mano (a kind of cheese), jalea de guayaba (guava jelly), and carne en vara (meat grilled on a stick). Fish is a very important food in the state's native cuisine. In Christmas is traditional to eat hallacas, pan de jamón (ham bread), torta negra (black cake), ensalada de gallina (chicken salad), and dulce de lechoza (preserved papaya). During Holy Week, cuajado de morrocoy (a dish made from red-footed tortoise) is common due to the belief that it is profane to eat meat at this time. Also during Holy Week, cuajado de cazon made from the school shark is common in the area of the eastern coast.

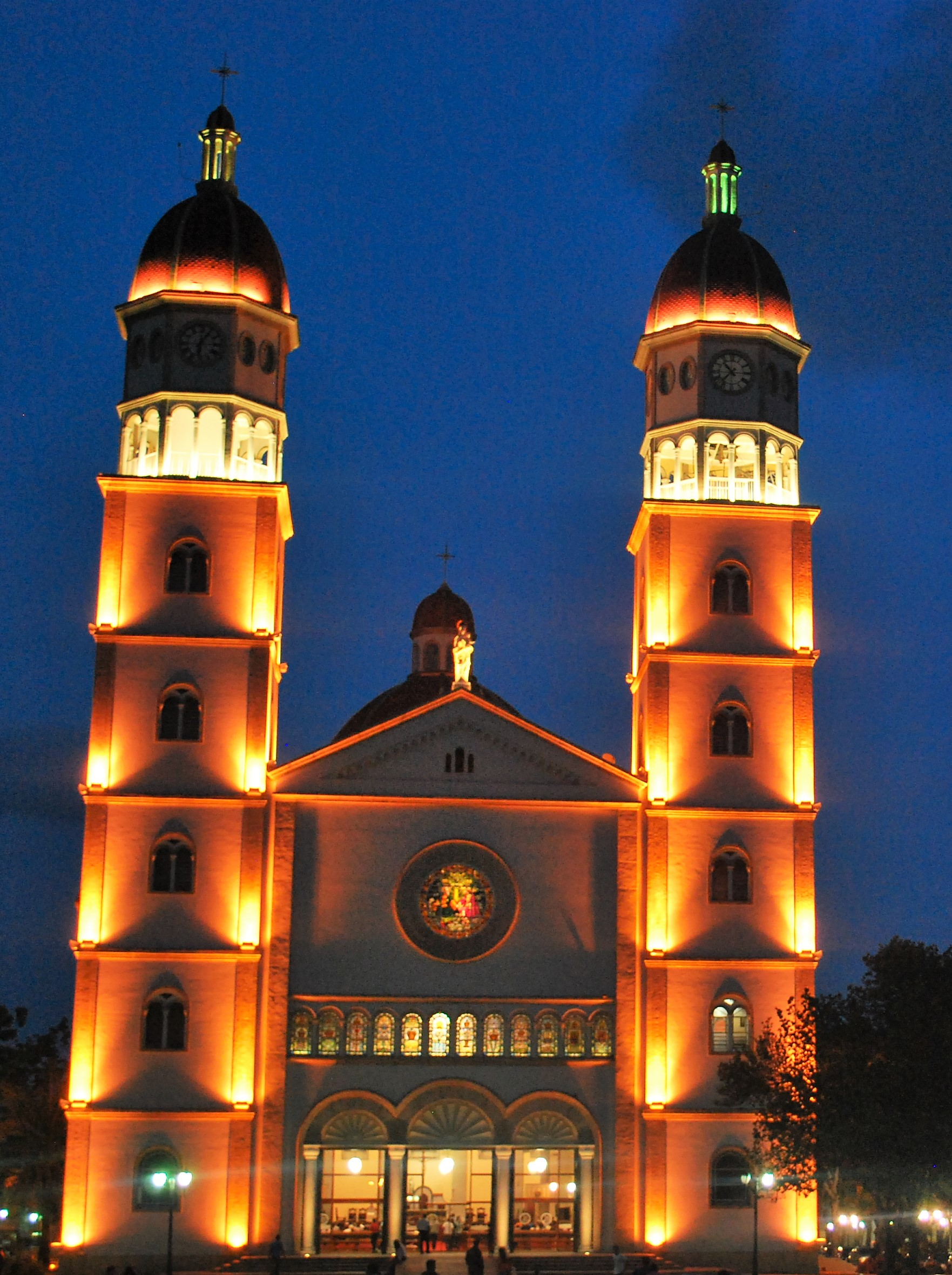
Façade of the Cathedral of Maturín, Monagas

=== Religion ===
The predominant religion in the state is Christianity. Catholicism is the Christian branch which has the largest number of followers, as a consequence of the evangelization carried out by Catholic missionaries, such as the Franciscans, in the 17th and 18th centuries. The capital, Maturín, has been the seat of a Catholic diocese since 1958.

On the other hand, religious syncretism, here the mixture of Catholic rites with the rites of other faiths such as indigenous and Yoruba religions, is common. For example, it is common to find people who venerate María Lionza, the native chief Guaicaipuro and Felipe the Black.

Some Protestant churches have been established in different in around the state. Among them are Pentecostals, Lutherans, Baptists, Seventh-day Adventists, Mormons and Jehovah's Witnesses. Anglicans have a church in the Caripe area.

Islam is practiced by some immigrants from Arabic countries, although they do not have a mosque in the state. It is also possible to find in Maturín followers of Buddhism, Hinduism, metaphysics, and other faiths.

=== Public holidays ===
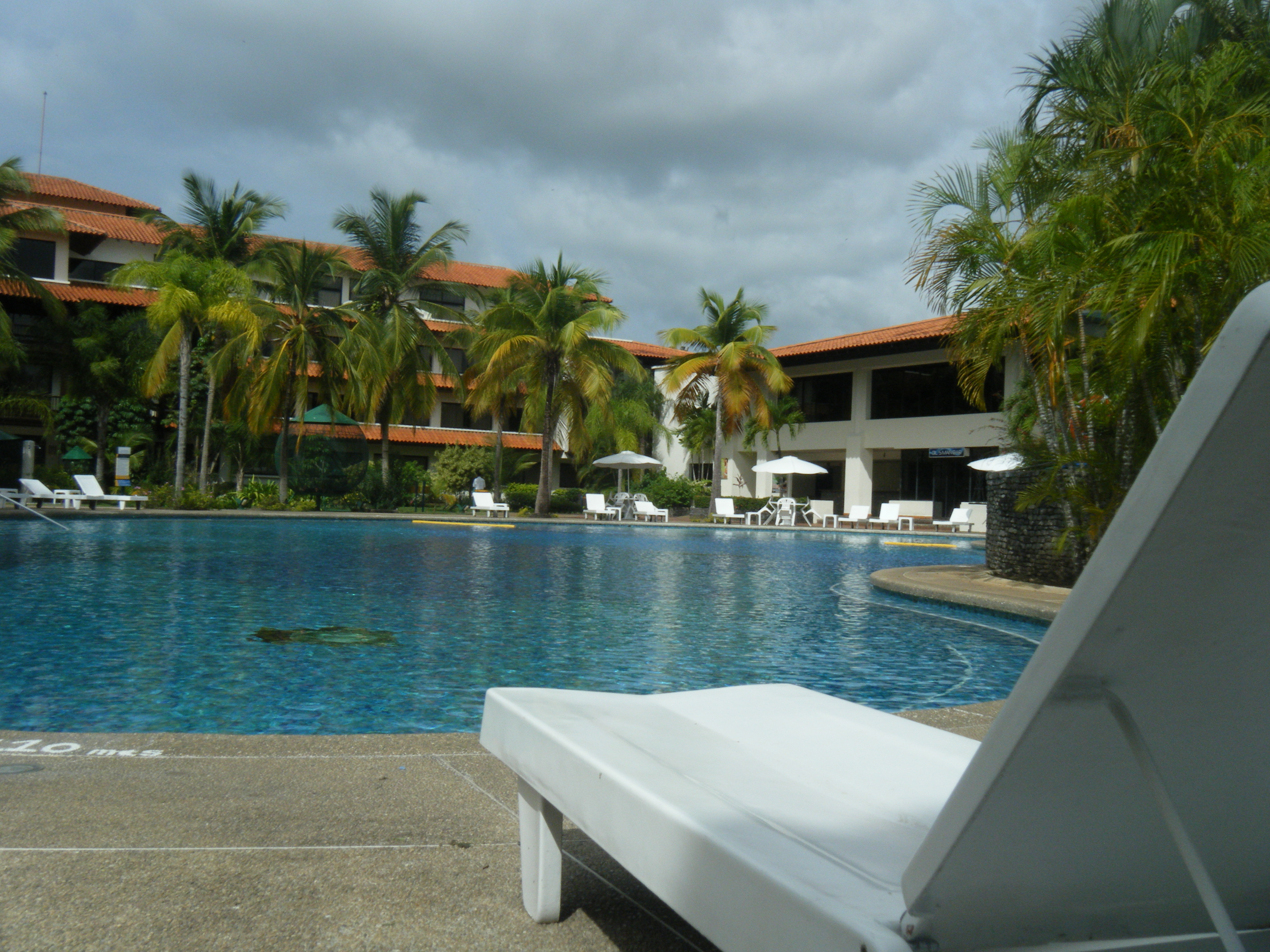
Hotel Stauffer swimming pool in Maturín

Public holidays include:

- Carnivals: between February and March.
- Holy Week: between March and April.
- Virgin of El Valle Festival: 8 September.
- Christmas Eve: 24 December.
- New Year's Eve: 31 December.

Apart from that, each town celebrates public festivities in honor of its patron saint when his/her day is held.

Regional anniversaries are:

- Battle of Los Godos Day: 25 May.
- General José Tadeo Monagas' Birthday: 28 October.
- Maturín's Foundation Day: 7 December.

== State symbols ==
=== Flag ===
It was created by Julius Caesar Adrían on 10 July 2002.

Flag of Monagas State

The meaning of the shapes and colors on the flag is as follows:

- Sky blue: Represents the sky.
- Stars: 13 rounding the image of Juana Ramírez, the Advancer, represent the 13 municipalities and the large star in the center identifies the capital municipality.
- Green: Represents soils, crops, mountains, forests and plains.
- Black: Represents oil.
- The sun: Represents the aura, life and strength of the people and its seven points symbolize the seven original districts that gave way to the 13 current municipalities. The black arch inside the sun represents the weapons of the indigenous people. The sun rises in the middle of the central stripe (green) and its maximum height reaches the upper edge of the first stripe.
- Sea blue: Represents the delta, rivers, lakes and reservoirs.

Image: The image of Juana Ramírez, the Advancer which represents the heroism of the Monagas woman.

- Daggers: The daggers that cross at the bottom of the image of Juana Ramírez represent the brothers José Tadeo Monagas and José Gregorio Monagas, both heroes of the Republic. The stripes occupy 30% of the lower part of the separation between them is half the diameter of each strip.

Coat of arms of the State of Monagas.

=== Coat of arms ===
The coat of arms of the State of Monagas is divided into two quarters: in the upper quarter, on a green field, is a plow, a rake and a sickle, which are intertwined with a bundle of ears of corn, attributes of agriculture; and in the lower quarter, on the green field representing the plain and blue background intersected by the horizon, is, in the shade of a large tree, a bull symbolizing animal husbandry, and in the distance a galley of hills. A silver bar crosses diagonally through both quarters, and on it reads: "Resisted with courage". The extremities of four rifles placed as a banner, appear holding the coat of arms, and between the bayonets a horse's head turned to the right of the coat of arms. Under and between the lower part of the rifles, there is a red and black ribbon, representative of the war to the death, and in it a broken key symbolizing that its capital was forced, but never surrendered. As an ornament on the flanks of the coat of arms, between their crossed feet, are a plains palm and a sugar cane stem.

== Sports ==
- Monagas Sport Club (First Division of Venezuela)
- Embajadores de Monagas (Bolivarian National Baseball League)
- Cangrejeros de Monagas (National Basketball League)
- Elite Rugby Club Monagas (Venezuelan Rugby Club Championship)

=== Sports facilities ===
- Monagas has had several teams that participate in Venezuela's national leagues since 2007. It also has the largest stadium in the country, the Estadio Monumental de Maturín, built for the 2007 Copa América.
- Maturín Sports Complex: It was built for the 1982 National Games. It has several facilities for the practice of sports such as basketball, soccer, minor baseball, indoor soccer, tennis, swimming, cycling and athletics. It is located on Raúl Leoni Avenue.
- Kartódromo de Viboral: a place for motocross competition, karting and car tuning exhibitions at national level.
- San Miguel Country Club Golf Course: located north of the city.

== Notable natives ==
From Amana of Tamarindo, town of Maturín municipality

- José Tadeo Monagas, general of the Venezuelan independence and president

From Barrancas

- Alarico Gómez, poet, novelist and journalist

From Caicara

- Manuel Núñez Tovar, doctor and entomologist
- Rafael Naranjo Ostty, lawyer-criminologist
- Wilfrida Corvo de López, educator

From Caripe

- Félix Antonio Calderón, poet

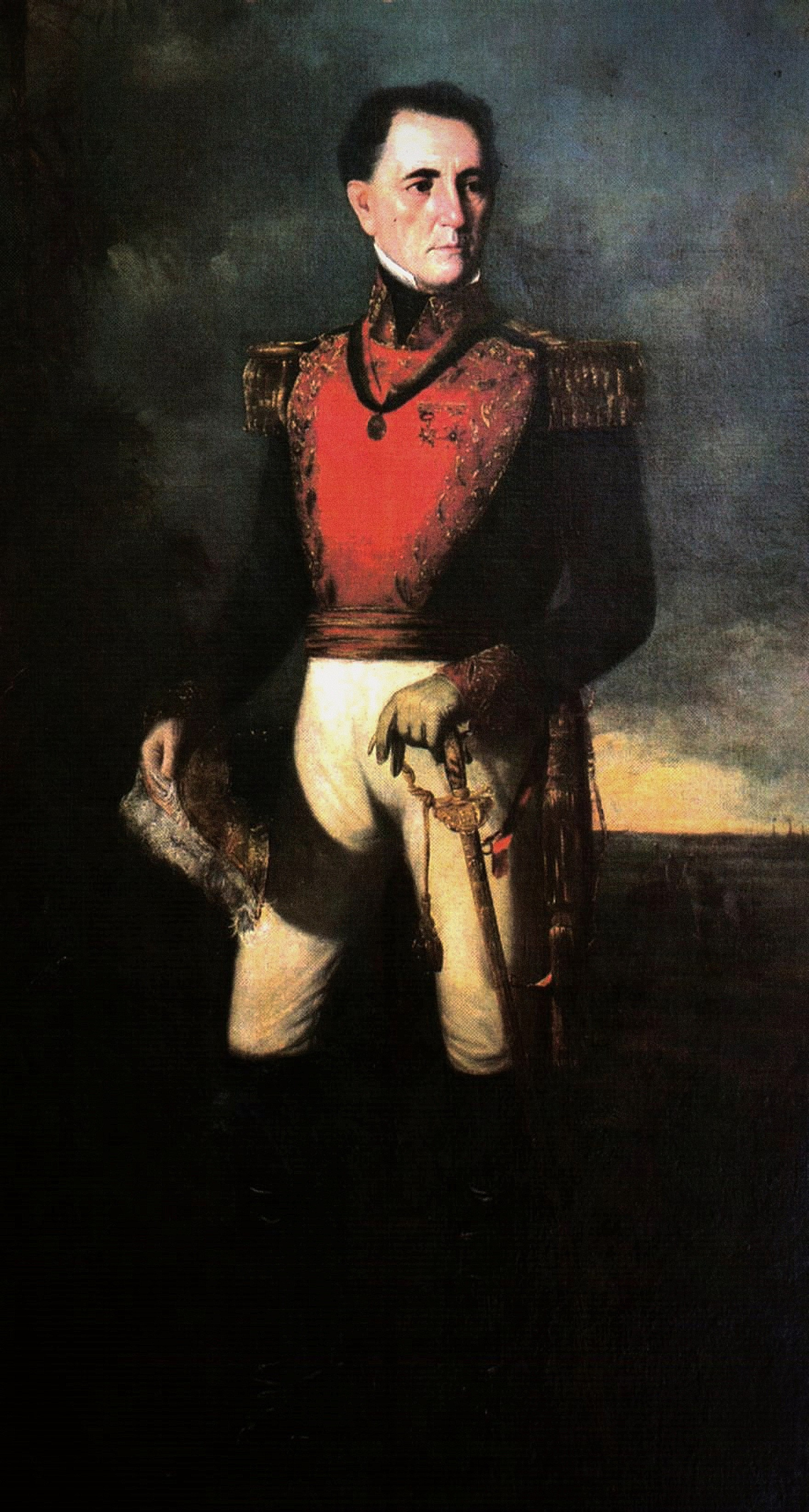
José Tadeo Monagas was President of Venezuela 1847–1851 and 1855–1858, and a hero of the Venezuelan War of Independence.

From Caripito

- Doris Wells, actress
- Juvenal Ravelo, artist
- Cherry Navarro, singer
- Tibursio C. Aparicio Lozada, poet
- Manny Trillo, professional baseball player

From Chaguaramal, town of Piar municipality

- Juana Ramírez (a.k.a. Juana la Avanzadora), heroine of the Venezuelan independence
- Leonardo Infante, general of the Venezuelan independence

From Guanaguana, town of Piar municipality

- Antonio Ciliberto Pérez, poet and novelist

From Maturín

- Andrés Rojas (general), general of the Venezuelan independence
- Karl Möhle, musician, composer and dentist
- José Gabriel Núñez Romberg, musician
- José Antonio Núñez Romberg, mathematician, teacher and historian
- Félix Armando Núñez, poet, teacher and dean of the University of Chile
- Idelfonso Núñez Mares, poet and teacher
- Eloy Palacios, sculptor
- José María Núñez, historian
- Benito Raúl Lozada, poet and writer

From Musipán, town of Ezequiel Zamora municipality

- Benjamín Rausseo (a.k.a. El Conde del Guácharo), television comedian

From San Antonio

- Julián Padrón, writer, journalist and lawyer
- William H. Phelps Jr., ornithologist and founder of RCTV
- Carlos Salazar Liccioni, poet, novelist
- Julio Gómez Peñalver, dentist, teacher and poet

From Uracoa

- Mateo Manaure, painter, artist
- Jesús Rafael Zambrano, journalist, lawyer, writer

== Sources ==
- González Oropeza, Hermann(1985): Historia del Estado Monagas. Ediciones Amon C.A., Caracas. (Biblioteca de Temas y Autores Monaguenses; Colección Guanipa; Ensayos e Investigaciónes)

== See also ==
- States of Venezuela
