= Aguasay Municipality, Monagas =

Aguasay Municipality Municipio Aguasay
- Municipality
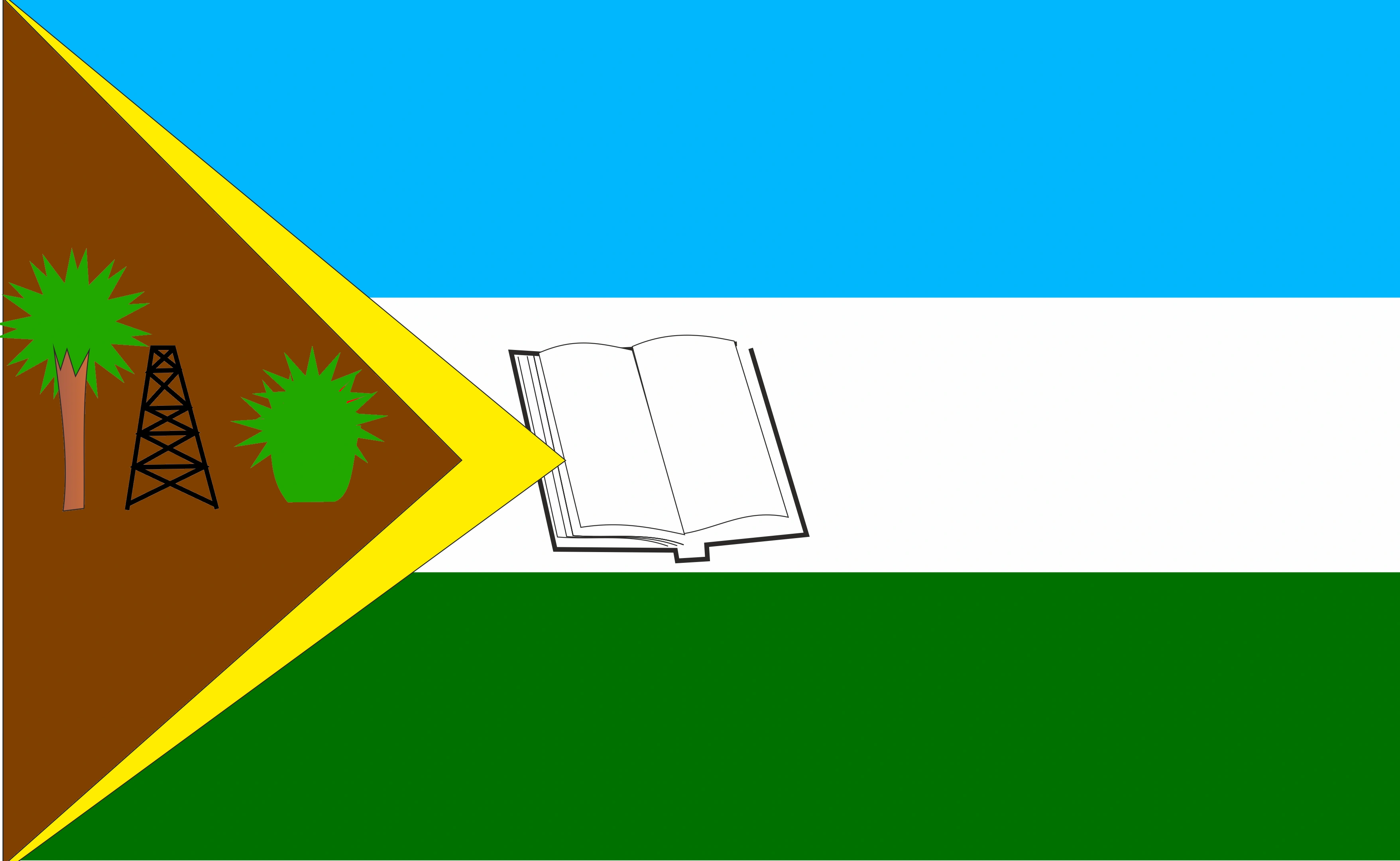
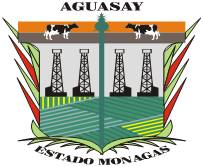
- Flag Coat of arms

- Location in Monagas

- Location in Venezuela
- Coordinates: 9°19′14″N 63°38′28″W
- Country: Venezuela
- State: Monagas
- Founded: 1987

Government
  - Mayor: Rafael Sánchez Mérida (PSUV)

Area
  - Total: 2,569.2 km^{2} (992.0 sq mi)

Population (2011)
  - Total: 11,771
  - Density: 4.5816/km^{2} (11.866/sq mi)
- Time zone: UTC−4 (VET)

Aguasay is one of the 13 municipalities of the state of Monagas, Venezuela.

== History ==
In 1987, it is elevated to Municipality within the old Maturín District On September 27, 1994, it is separated from the Municipality of Maturín creating the Autonomous Municipality of Aguasay.

== Geography ==
It is located to the west of the Monagas State, bordered to the north by the municipalities of Ezequiel Zamora and Santa Bárbara.

The landscape is predominantly flat table, while it presents a tropical dry forest vegetation with an annual average temperature of 25.4°C and an average annual precipitation of 1,055 mm.

== Economy ==
The oil exploitation in the municipality is relevant.

== Culture ==
The town is famous for its fabric that is made from a plant that is grown in that town called Curagua.

=== Cuisine ===
A sweet in Aguasay is the Moriche Ice Cream.

== Politics and government ==
=== Mayors ===
- José Galindo PSUV
