= Punceres Municipality, Monagas =

Punceres Municipality Municipio Punceres
- Municipality
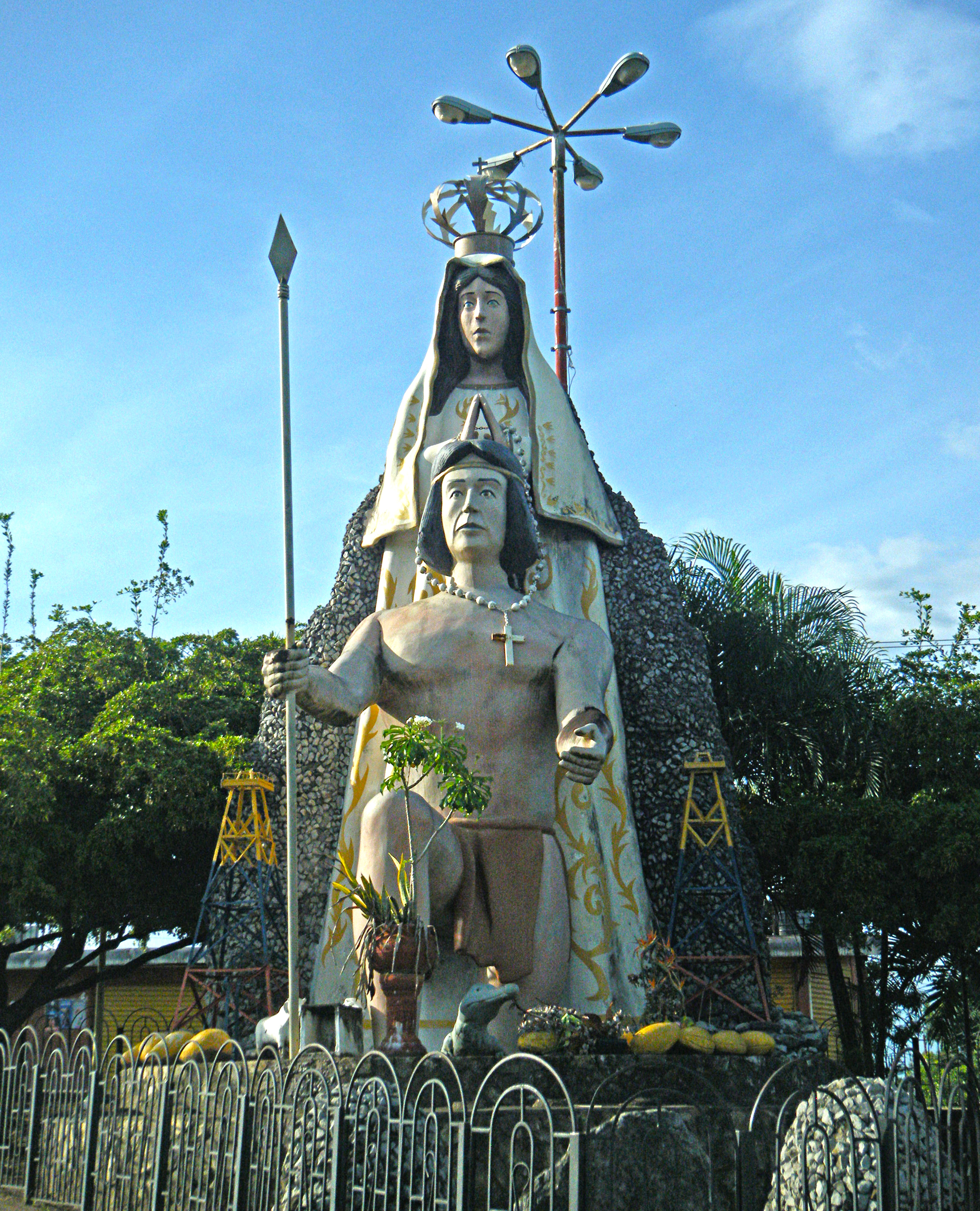

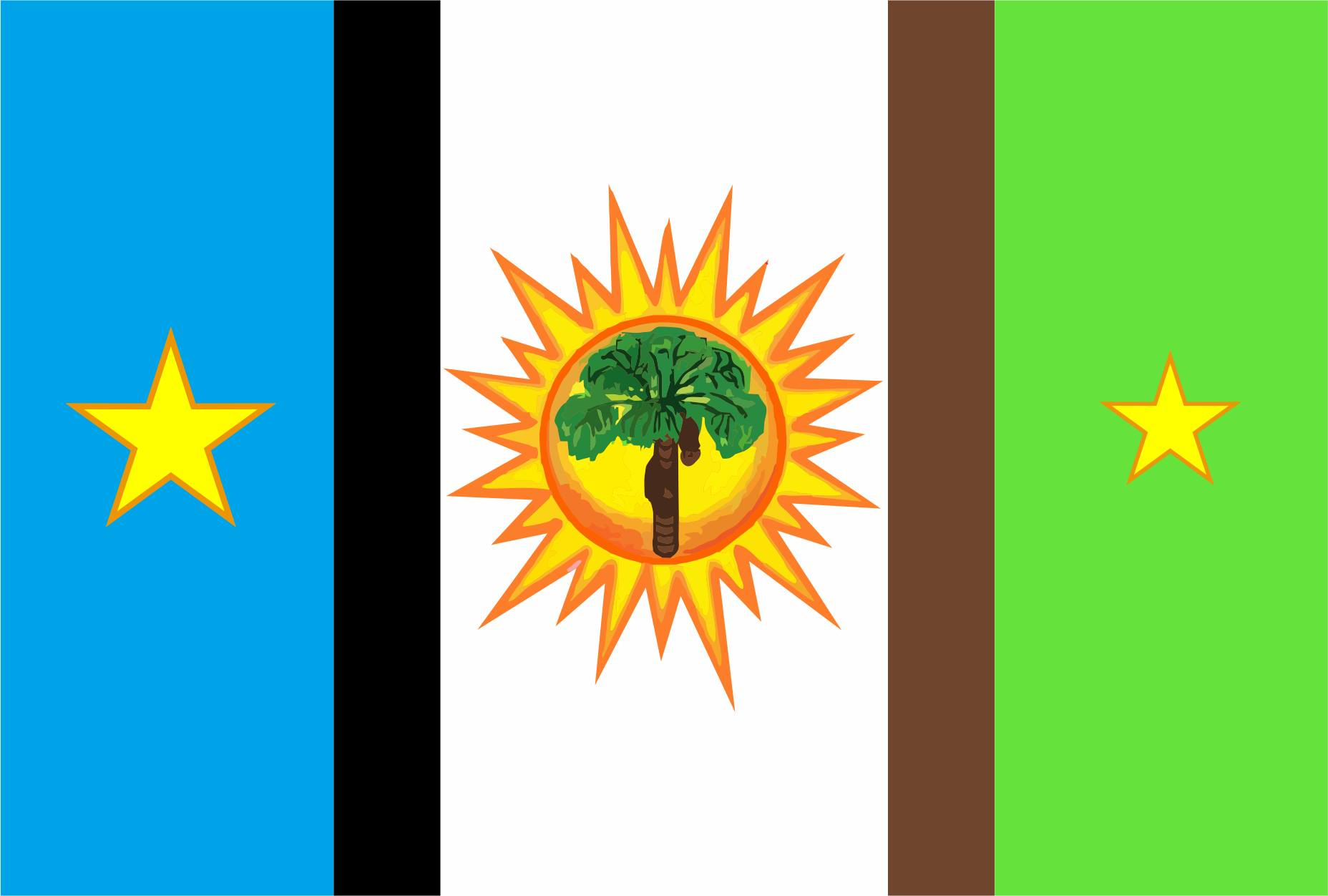
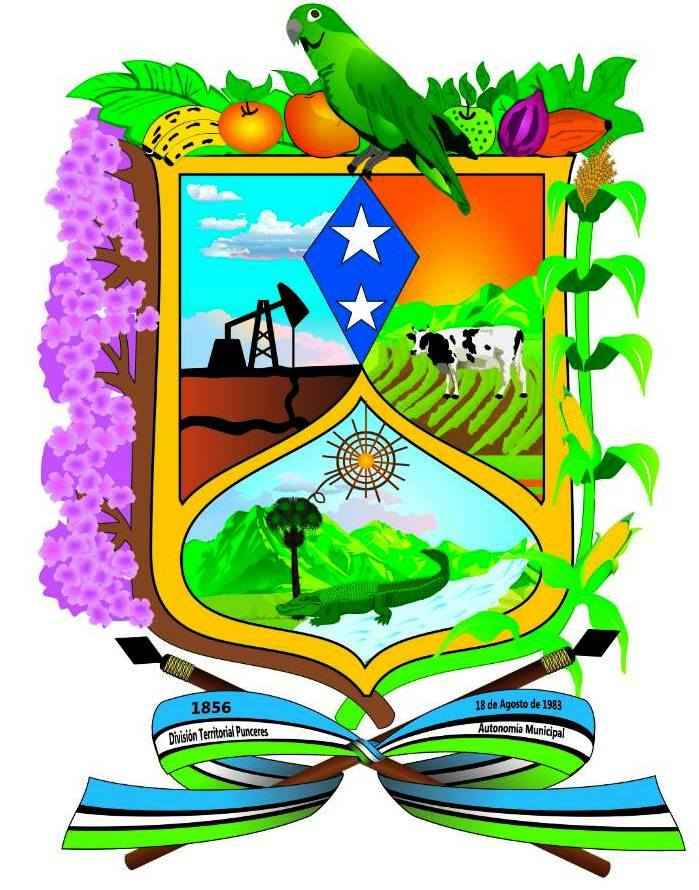
- Flag Coat of arms

- Location in Monagas

- Location in Venezuela
- Coordinates: 9°57′58″N 63°08′21″W
- Country: Venezuela
- State: Monagas
- Municipal seat: Quiriquire[*]

Government
  - Mayor: Angel López Ávila (PSUV)

Area
  - Total: 613.8 km^{2} (237.0 sq mi)

Population
  - Total: 905,443
  - Density: 1,475/km^{2} (3,821/sq mi)
- Time zone: UTC−4 (VET)

Punceres is one of the 13 municipalities of the state of Monagas, Venezuela. The municipality's capital is Quiriquire.

== Geography ==
Punceres is located to the north of Monagas State. Presents a vegetation of dry tropical forest and another of humid tropical forest, has an annual average temperature of 26.4 °C and rainfall of 1,935 mm (annual average).

== Government ==
=== Mayors ===
- Jesus Mata. (2008–2013) PSUV.
- Magalys Villalba. (2013–2017) PSUV.
