= Bolívar Municipality, Monagas =

Bolívar
- Municipality
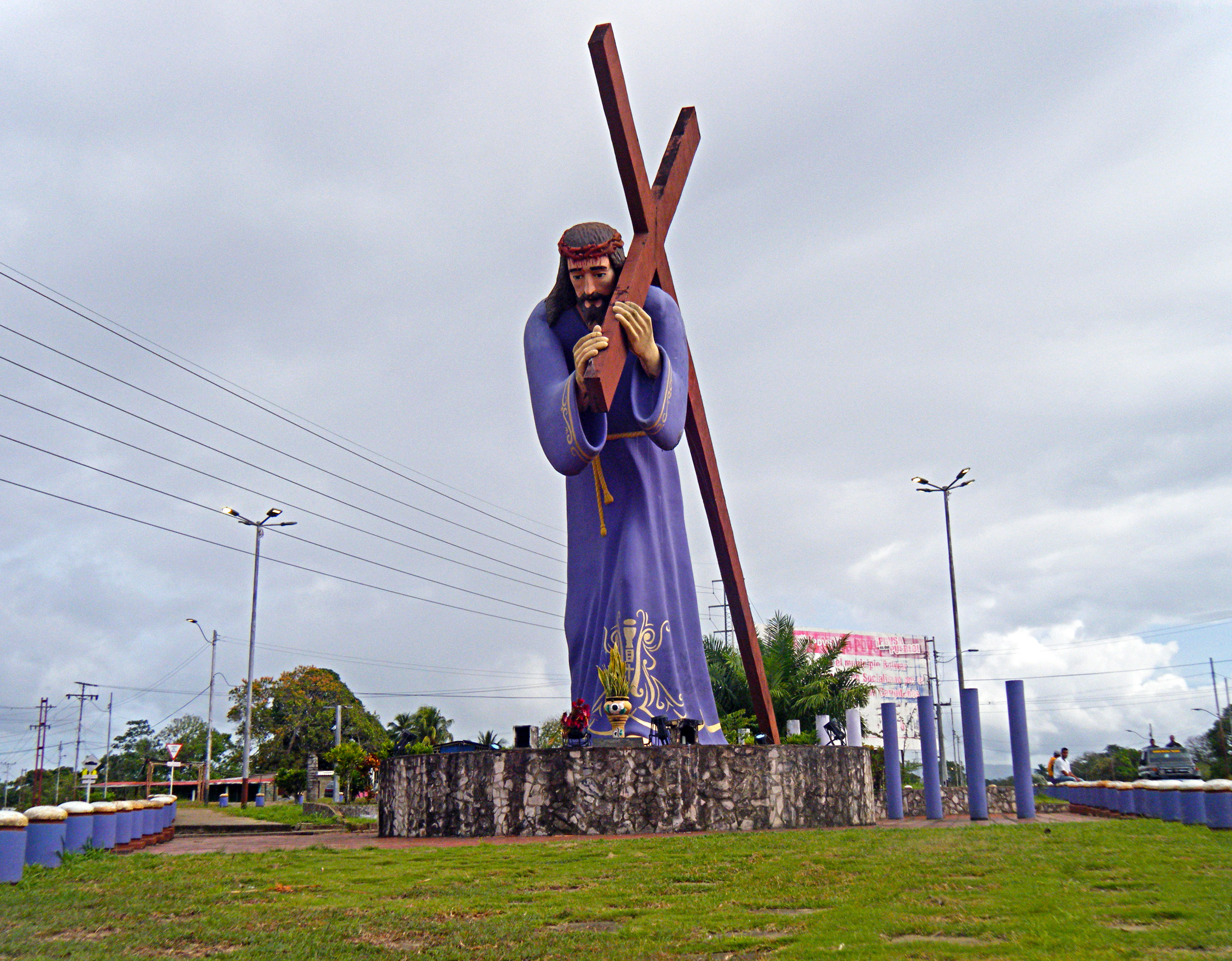
- Nazareno monument in Caripito

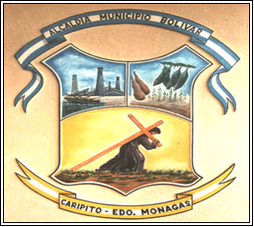
- Flag Coat of arms

- Location of Acosta Municipality in Monagas
- Country: Venezuela
- State: Monagas

Government
  - Mayor: Junior Ortíz Martinez ((PSUV))

Population (2011)
  - Total: 54,777
- Time zone: UTC−4 (VET)

Bolívar is one of the 13 municipalities of the state of Monagas, Venezuela. The capital is Caripito. The municipality is one of several in Venezuela named ‘Bolívar Municipality’ in honour of Venezuelan independence hero Simón Bolívar.

By decree of 16 January 1896, the Monagas State legislature created the Colon Municipality of the Piar District in the Maturín section, consisting of the hamlets Caripito, Río Abajo, Sabaneta, El Amparo, and Sabana de Teresen, which was part of the Municipality of Punceres Of Piar District.

== Geography ==
The climate is tropical as in all the climatic zone of the same name, the temperature must oscillate between 20°C and 30°C.

All the surface of the area pours its waters to the Gulf of Paria through the San Juan River, by direct tributaries to that River. Among the first are Rio Caripe - Rio San Miguel.

== Mayors ==
- Carlos Betancourt (2004 - 2008), (2008 - 2013) and (2013 - 2017), PSUV
- Nelson Lopez (2017 - 2021), PSUV
