= Libertador Municipality, Monagas =

Libertador Municipality Municipio Libertador
- Municipality
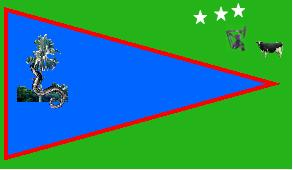
- Flag

- Location in Monagas

- Location in Venezuela
- Coordinates: 9°04′25″N 62°35′21″W
- Country: Venezuela
- State: Monagas

Government
  - Mayor: Carlos Requena (PSUV)

Area
  - Total: 3,238.4 km^{2} (1,250.4 sq mi)

Population (2011)
  - Total: 53,917
  - Density: 16.649/km^{2} (43.121/sq mi)
- Time zone: UTC−4 (VET)
- Website: Official website

Libertador is one of the 13 municipalities of the state of Monagas, Venezuela. The municipality's capital is Temblador.

== Geography ==
Libertador Municipality is located to the southwest of Monagas State. Its vegetation is tropical dry forest, with average annual temperature of 27.1°C and average annual precipitation of 1,000 mm. Among the main watercourses are Caño Mánamo and the Morichal Largo River.

== Economy ==
The economy is based on agriculture and forestry (primarily pine plantations).

== Culture ==
The indigenous Warao people live in Libertador Municipality. They speak Warao, an agglutinative language isolate.

=== Cuisine ===
A typical dish of this region is Soup of Ocumo, prepared with banana, jojoto and leaf sprouts of ocumo (Xanthosoma).

=== Public holidays ===
On September 8, the region celebrates the day of the Virgin of the Valley, patron of the east of Venezuela.

== Mayor ==
- Miguel Presilla (2017 - 2021) PCV.
