= Juana Ramírez =

Venezuelan heroine

Juana Ramírez (c. 1790–1856), better known as Juana "La Avanzadora", was a soldier and heroine of the Venezuelan War of Independence.

== Biography ==
An Afro-Venezuelan, Ramirez was born into slavery. In 1813, Ramírez commanded an all-female, 100-strong artillery unit, which was instrumental in resisting Spanish soldiers' attempts to reconquer the then newly independent Venezuela and make it a colony again. Her sobriquet, "La Avanzadora", came from her being the first one to advance.

== Legacy ==
A monument, constructed and declared the District Patriotic Sanctuary in 1975, and then the Regional Patriotic Sanctuary in 1994, designates the final resting place of her remains. The monument, Juana La Avanzadora, was erected in her honor on Bolívar avenue in Maturín. On October 23, 2001, the symbolic remains of Juana Ramírez were inducted into the National Pantheon of Venezuela, the last resting place of heroes of the War for Independence and important figures in Venezuelan society.

In 2015 she became the first black woman to be posthumously laid to rest in the National Pantheon of Venezuela. In 2023, arachnologists named a new species of Venezuelan tarantula, Xenesthis avanzadora Sherwood et al., 2023, after her.
