= Cabinet of Nicolás Maduro =

Venezuelan cabinet from 2013

Nicolás Maduro became president of Venezuela on 5 March 2013.

== Cabinet ==
Name	Spanish name	Creation date, name change or merger	Holder	In office since
Office of the Presidency and Monitoring of Government Management	Ministerio del Poder Popular del Despacho de la Presidencia y Seguimiento de la Gestión de Gobierno	2012	Jorge Elieser Márquez	2017
Office of the Presidency and Monitoring of Government Management	Ministerio del Poder Popular del Despacho de la Presidencia y Seguimiento de la Gestión de Gobierno	2012	Erika Farías	2017
Office of the Presidency and Monitoring of Government Management	Ministerio del Poder Popular del Despacho de la Presidencia y Seguimiento de la Gestión de Gobierno	2012	Carlos Alberto Osorio Zambrano	2017
Office of the Presidency and Monitoring of Government Management	Ministerio del Poder Popular del Despacho de la Presidencia y Seguimiento de la Gestión de Gobierno	2012	Carmen Meléndez	2016 - 2017
Office of the Presidency and Monitoring of Government Management	Ministerio del Poder Popular del Despacho de la Presidencia y Seguimiento de la Gestión de Gobierno	2012	Jesús Rafael Salazar Velásquez	2016
Office of the Presidency and Monitoring of Government Management	Ministerio del Poder Popular del Despacho de la Presidencia y Seguimiento de la Gestión de Gobierno	2012	Carmen Meléndez	2015
Office of the Presidency and Monitoring of Government Management	Ministerio del Poder Popular del Despacho de la Presidencia y Seguimiento de la Gestión de Gobierno	2012	Carlos Alberto Osorio Zambrano	2014 - 2015
Office of the Presidency and Monitoring of Government Management	Ministerio del Poder Popular del Despacho de la Presidencia y Seguimiento de la Gestión de Gobierno	2012	Hugo Cabezas	2014
Office of the Presidency and Monitoring of Government Management	Ministerio del Poder Popular del Despacho de la Presidencia y Seguimiento de la Gestión de Gobierno	2012	Wilmer Barrientos	2013 - 2014
Office of the Presidency and Monitoring of Government Management	Ministerio del Poder Popular del Despacho de la Presidencia y Seguimiento de la Gestión de Gobierno	2012	Carmen Meléndez	2013
Ministry of Internal Relations, Justice and Peace	Ministerio del Poder Popular para Relaciones Interiores, Justicia y Paz	2013	Néstor Reverol	2016
Ministry of Internal Relations, Justice and Peace	Ministerio del Poder Popular para Relaciones Interiores, Justicia y Paz	2013	Gustavo González López	2015 - 2016
Ministry of Internal Relations, Justice and Peace	Ministerio del Poder Popular para Relaciones Interiores, Justicia y Paz	2013	Carmen Meléndez	2014 - 2015
Ministry of Internal Relations, Justice and Peace	Ministerio del Poder Popular para Relaciones Interiores, Justicia y Paz	2013	Miguel Rodríguez Torres	2013 - 2014
Ministry of Internal Relations, Justice and Peace	Ministerio del Poder Popular para Relaciones Interiores, Justicia y Paz	2013	Néstor Reverol	2013
Ministry of Foreign Affairs	Ministerio del Poder Popular para Relaciones Exteriores	1810	Jorge Arreaza	2017
Ministry of Foreign Affairs	Ministerio del Poder Popular para Relaciones Exteriores	1810	Samuel Moncada Acosta	2017
Ministry of Foreign Affairs	Ministerio del Poder Popular para Relaciones Exteriores	1810	Delcy Rodríguez Gómez	2014 - 2017
Ministry of Foreign Affairs	Ministerio del Poder Popular para Relaciones Exteriores	1810	Rafael Ramírez Carreño	2014
Ministry of Foreign Affairs	Ministerio del Poder Popular para Relaciones Exteriores	1810	Elías Jaua Milano	2013 - 2014
Ministry of Economy, Finance and Public Banking	Ministerio del Poder Popular para la Economía y Finanzas	2017	Simón Zerpa	2017
Ministry of Economy, Finance and Public Banking	Ministerio del Poder Popular para la Economía y Finanzas	2017	Ramón Augusto Lobo Moreno	2017
Ministry of Economy, Finance and Public Banking	Ministerio del Poder Popular para la Economía y Finanzas	2017	Rodolfo Medina del Río	2016 - 2017
Ministry of Economy, Finance and Public Banking	Ministerio del Poder Popular para la Economía y Finanzas	2017	Rodolfo Clemente Marco Torres	2014 - 2016
Ministry of Economy, Finance and Public Banking	Ministerio del Poder Popular para la Economía y Finanzas	2017	Nelson Merentes	2013 - 2014
Ministry of Defense	Ministerio del Poder Popular para la Defensa	1810	Vladimir Padrino López	2014
Ministry of Defense	Ministerio del Poder Popular para la Defensa	1810	Carmen Meléndez	2013 - 2014
Ministry of Defense	Ministerio del Poder Popular para la Defensa	1810	Diego Molero	2013
Ministry of Tourism and Foreign Trade	Ministerio del Poder Popular para el Turismo y Comercio Exterior	2019	Félix Plasencia	2019
Ministry of Tourism and Foreign Trade	Ministerio del Poder Popular para el Turismo y Comercio Exterior	2019	Stella Lugo	2018 - 2019
Ministry of Tourism and Foreign Trade	Ministerio del Poder Popular para el Turismo y Comercio Exterior	2019	Marleny Contreras	2015 - 2018
Ministry of Tourism and Foreign Trade	Ministerio del Poder Popular para el Turismo y Comercio Exterior	2019	Andrés Izarra	2013 - 2015
Ministry of Agriculture and Land	Ministerio del Poder Popular para la Agricultura Productiva y las Tierras	2016	Wilmar Castro Soteldo	2016
Ministry of Agriculture and Land	Ministerio del Poder Popular para la Agricultura Productiva y las Tierras	2016	José Luis Berroterán	2014 - 2015
Ministry of Agriculture and Land	Ministerio del Poder Popular para la Agricultura Productiva y las Tierras	2016	Iván Gil	2013 - 2014 2015 - 2016
Ministry of Agriculture and Land	Ministerio del Poder Popular para la Agricultura Productiva y las Tierras	2016	Juan Carlos Loyo	2013
Ministry of Fisheries and Aquaculture	Ministerio del Poder Popular para la Pesca y Acuicultura	2016	Dante Rivas	2018
Ministry of Urban Agriculture	Ministerio del Poder Popular de Agricultura Urbana	2016	Gabriela Peña	2019
Ministry of Education	Ministerio del Poder Popular para la Educación	1881	Aristóbulo Istúriz	2018
Ministry of Education	Ministerio del Poder Popular para la Educación	1881	Elías Jaua	2017 - 2018
Ministry of Education	Ministerio del Poder Popular para la Educación	1881	Rodulfo Pérez Hernández	2015 - 2017
Ministry of Education	Ministerio del Poder Popular para la Educación	1881	Héctor Rodríguez Castro	2013 - 2015
Ministry of Health	Ministerio del Poder Popular para la Salud	1936	Carlos Alvarado González	2018
Ministry of Health	Ministerio del Poder Popular para la Salud	1936	Luis López Chejade	2017 - 2018
Ministry of Health	Ministerio del Poder Popular para la Salud	1936	Antonieta Caporale Zamora	2017
Ministry of Health	Ministerio del Poder Popular para la Salud	1936	Luisana Melo Solórzano	2016
Ministry of Health	Ministerio del Poder Popular para la Salud	1936	Henry Ventura	2015
Ministry of Health	Ministerio del Poder Popular para la Salud	1936	Nancy Pérez Sierra	2014
Ministry of Health	Ministerio del Poder Popular para la Salud	1936	Francisco Alejandro Armada Pérez	2014
Ministry of Health	Ministerio del Poder Popular para la Salud	1936	Isabel Iturria	2013 - 2014
Ministry of the Social Work Process	Ministerio del Poder Popular para el Proceso Social del Trabajo	2014	Eduardo Piñate	2018
Ministry of the Social Work Process	Ministerio del Poder Popular para el Proceso Social del Trabajo	2014	Néstor Ovalles	2017 - 2018
Ministry of the Social Work Process	Ministerio del Poder Popular para el Proceso Social del Trabajo	2014	Francisco Torrealba	2016 - 2017
Ministry of the Social Work Process	Ministerio del Poder Popular para el Proceso Social del Trabajo	2014	Oswaldo Vera	2016
Ministry of the Social Work Process	Ministerio del Poder Popular para el Proceso Social del Trabajo	2014	Jesús Martinez	2014 - 2016
Ministry of the Social Work Process	Ministerio del Poder Popular para el Proceso Social del Trabajo	2014	María Cristina Iglesias	2013 - 2014
Ministry of Housing and Habitat	Ministerio del Poder Popular para Hábitat y Vivienda	2005	Ildemaro Moisés Villarroel Arismendi	2017
Ministry of Housing and Habitat	Ministerio del Poder Popular para Hábitat y Vivienda	2005	Manuel Quevedo	2015 - 2017
Ministry of Housing and Habitat	Ministerio del Poder Popular para Hábitat y Vivienda	2005	Ricardo Molina	2013 - 2015
Ministry of Ecosocialism and Water	Ministerio del Poder Popular para el Ecosocialismo	2015	Oswaldo Barbera	2019
Ministry of Ecosocialism and Water	Ministerio del Poder Popular para el Ecosocialismo	2015	Heryck Rangel	2018 - 2019
Ministry of Ecosocialism and Water	Ministerio del Poder Popular para el Ecosocialismo	2015	Ramón Celestino Velázquez	2017 - 2018
Ministry of Ecosocialism and Water	Ministerio del Poder Popular para el Ecosocialismo	2015	Ernesto Paiva	2016 - 2017
Ministry of Ecosocialism and Water	Ministerio del Poder Popular para el Ecosocialismo	2015	Guillermo Rafael Barreto Esnal	2015 - 2016
Ministry of Ecosocialism and Water	Ministerio del Poder Popular para el Ecosocialismo	2015	Miguel Leonardo Rodríguez	2013 - 2014
Ministry of Ecosocialism and Water	Ministerio del Poder Popular para el Ecosocialismo	2015	Dante Rivas	2013
Ministry of Petroleum	Ministerio del Poder Popular de Petróleo	2017	Tareck El Aissami	2020
Ministry of Petroleum	Ministerio del Poder Popular de Petróleo	2017	Manuel Quevedo	2017
Ministry of Petroleum	Ministerio del Poder Popular de Petróleo	2017	Eulogio del Pino	2017
Ministry of Petroleum	Ministerio del Poder Popular de Petróleo	2017	Nelson Martínez	2017
Ministry of Petroleum	Ministerio del Poder Popular de Petróleo	2017	Eulogio del Pino	2016 - 2017
Ministry of Planning	Ministerio del Poder Popular de Planificación	2013	Ricardo José Menéndez Prieto	2014
Ministry of Planning	Ministerio del Poder Popular de Planificación	2013	Jorge Giordani	2011 - 2014
Ministry of University Education	Ministerio del Poder Popular para la Educación Universitaria	2014	César Gabriel Trómpiz	2019
Ministry of University Education	Ministerio del Poder Popular para la Educación Universitaria	2014	Hugbel Roa	2017 - 2019
Ministry of University Education	Ministerio del Poder Popular para la Educación Universitaria	2014	Jheyson Guzmán	2014
Ministry of University Education	Ministerio del Poder Popular para la Educación Universitaria	2014	Ricardo Menéndez	2014
Ministry of University Education	Ministerio del Poder Popular para la Educación Universitaria	2014	Pedro Calzadilla	2013 - 2014
Ministry of Science, Technology and Innovation	Ministerio del Poder Popular para la Ciencia y Tecnología	2019	Gabriela Jiménez Ramírez	2019
Ministry of Science, Technology and Innovation	Ministerio del Poder Popular para la Ciencia y Tecnología	2019	Freddy Brito	2019
Ministry of Science, Technology and Innovation	Ministerio del Poder Popular para la Ciencia y Tecnología	2019	Hugbel Roa	2017 - 2019
Ministry of Science, Technology and Innovation	Ministerio del Poder Popular para la Ciencia y Tecnología	2019	Jorge Arreaza	2016 - 2017
Ministry of Science, Technology and Innovation	Ministerio del Poder Popular para la Ciencia y Tecnología	2019	Manuel Fernández	2013 - 2016
Ministry of Science, Technology and Innovation	Ministerio del Poder Popular para la Ciencia y Tecnología	2019	Jorge Arreaza	2012 - 2013
Ministry of Communication and Information	Ministerio del Poder Popular para la Comunicación e Información	2002	Jorge Rodríguez Gómez	2017
Ministry of Communication and Information	Ministerio del Poder Popular para la Comunicación e Información	2002	Ernesto Villegas	2016 - 2017
Ministry of Communication and Information	Ministerio del Poder Popular para la Comunicación e Información	2002	Luis José Marcano Salazar	2016
Ministry of Communication and Information	Ministerio del Poder Popular para la Comunicación e Información	2002	Desiree Santos Amaral	2015 - 2016
Ministry of Communication and Information	Ministerio del Poder Popular para la Comunicación e Información	2002	Jacqueline Faría	2014 - 2015
Ministry of Communication and Information	Ministerio del Poder Popular para la Comunicación e Información	2002	Delcy Eloina Rodríguez Gómez	2013 - 2014
Ministry of Communes and Social Protection	Ministerio del Poder Popular para las Comunas y los Movimientos Sociales	2009	Blanca Eekhout	2018
Ministry of Communes and Social Protection	Ministerio del Poder Popular para las Comunas y los Movimientos Sociales	2009	Aristóbulo Istúriz	2018 - 2018
Ministry of Communes and Social Protection	Ministerio del Poder Popular para las Comunas y los Movimientos Sociales	2009	Kira Andrade	2017 - 2018
Ministry of Communes and Social Protection	Ministerio del Poder Popular para las Comunas y los Movimientos Sociales	2009	Aristobulo Isturiz	2017
Ministry of Communes and Social Protection	Ministerio del Poder Popular para las Comunas y los Movimientos Sociales	2009	Rosangela Orozco	2015
Ministry of Communes and Social Protection	Ministerio del Poder Popular para las Comunas y los Movimientos Sociales	2009	Elías Jaua Milano	2014 - 2015
Ministry of Communes and Social Protection	Ministerio del Poder Popular para las Comunas y los Movimientos Sociales	2009	Reinaldo Iturriza	2013 - 2014
Ministry of Food	Ministerio del Poder Popular para la Alimentación	2004	Carlos Leal Tellería	2019
Ministry of Food	Ministerio del Poder Popular para la Alimentación	2004	Luis Alberto Medina Ramírez	2017 - 2019
Ministry of Food	Ministerio del Poder Popular para la Alimentación	2004	Rodolfo Clemente Marco Torres	2016 - 2017
Ministry of Food	Ministerio del Poder Popular para la Alimentación	2004	Carlos Alberto Osorio Zambrano	2015
Ministry of Food	Ministerio del Poder Popular para la Alimentación	2004	Iván José Bello	2014 - 2015
Ministry of Food	Ministerio del Poder Popular para la Alimentación	2004	Hebert García	2014
Ministry of Food	Ministerio del Poder Popular para la Alimentación	2004	Félix Osorio	2013 - 2014
Ministry of Culture	Ministerio del Poder Popular para la Cultura	2005	Ernesto Villegas	2017
Ministry of Culture	Ministerio del Poder Popular para la Cultura	2005	Ana Alejandrina Reyes	2017
Ministry of Culture	Ministerio del Poder Popular para la Cultura	2005	Adán Chávez	2017
Ministry of Culture	Ministerio del Poder Popular para la Cultura	2005	Freddy Ñáñez	2016 - 2017
Ministry of Culture	Ministerio del Poder Popular para la Cultura	2005	Reinaldo Iturriza	2014 - 2016
Ministry of Culture	Ministerio del Poder Popular para la Cultura	2005	Fidel Barbarito	2013 - 2014
Ministry of Youth and Sports	Ministerio del Poder Popular para la Juventud y el Deporte	2014	Pedro Infante	2017
Ministry of Youth and Sports	Ministerio del Poder Popular para la Juventud y el Deporte	2014	Mervin Maldonado	2016 - 2017
Ministry of Youth and Sports	Ministerio del Poder Popular para la Juventud y el Deporte	2014	Pedro Infante	2015 - 2016
Ministry of Youth and Sports	Ministerio del Poder Popular para la Juventud y el Deporte	2014	Antonio Álvarez	2014 - 2015
Ministry of Indigenous Peoples	Ministerio del Poder Popular para los Pueblos Indígenas	2007	Aloha Núñez	2018
Ministry of Indigenous Peoples	Ministerio del Poder Popular para los Pueblos Indígenas	2007	Yamilet Mirabal Calderón	2017 - 2018
Ministry of Indigenous Peoples	Ministerio del Poder Popular para los Pueblos Indígenas	2007	Aloha Núñez	2016 - 2017
Ministry of Indigenous Peoples	Ministerio del Poder Popular para los Pueblos Indígenas	2007	Clara Vidal	2015 - 2016
Ministry of Indigenous Peoples	Ministerio del Poder Popular para los Pueblos Indígenas	2007	Aloha Núñez	2013 - 2015
Ministry of Women and Gender Equality	Ministerio del Poder Popular para la Mujer y la Igualdad de Género	2009	Asia Villegas	2019
Ministry of Women and Gender Equality	Ministerio del Poder Popular para la Mujer y la Igualdad de Género	2009	Caryl Bertho	2018 - 2019
Ministry of Women and Gender Equality	Ministerio del Poder Popular para la Mujer y la Igualdad de Género	2009	Blanca Eekhout	2016 - 2018
Ministry of Women and Gender Equality	Ministerio del Poder Popular para la Mujer y la Igualdad de Género	2009	Gladys Requena	2015 - 2016
Ministry of Women and Gender Equality	Ministerio del Poder Popular para la Mujer y la Igualdad de Género	2009	Andreína Tarazón	2013 - 2015
Ministry of the Prison Service	Ministerio del Poder Popular para el Servicio Penitenciario	2011	Iris Varela	2018
Ministry of the Prison Service	Ministerio del Poder Popular para el Servicio Penitenciario	2011	Mirelys Contreras	2017 - 2018
Ministry of the Prison Service	Ministerio del Poder Popular para el Servicio Penitenciario	2011	Iris Varela	2013 - 2017
Ministry of Public Works	Ministerio del Poder Popular para Obras Públicas	2017	Raúl Alfonso Paredes	2018
Ministry of Public Works	Ministerio del Poder Popular para Obras Públicas	2017	Marleny Contreras	2018 - 2019
Ministry of Public Works	Ministerio del Poder Popular para Obras Públicas	2017	César Alberto Salazar Coll	2017 - 2018
Ministry of Transportation	Ministerio del Poder Popular para Transporte	2017	Hipólito Abreu	2018
Ministry of Transportation	Ministerio del Poder Popular para Transporte	2017	Carlos Osorio Zambrano	2017 - 2018
Ministry of Transportation	Ministerio del Poder Popular para Transporte	2017	Juan de Jesús García Toussaintt	2017
Ministry of Transportation	Ministerio del Poder Popular para Transporte	2017	Ricardo Molina	2016 - 2017
Ministry of Transportation	Ministerio del Poder Popular para Transporte	2017	Luis Sauce	2015 - 2016
Ministry of Transportation	Ministerio del Poder Popular para Transporte	2017	Haiman El Troudi	2014 - 2015
Ministry of Electric Power	Ministerio del Poder Popular para la Energía Eléctrica	2009	Freddy Brito Maestre	2019
Ministry of Electric Power	Ministerio del Poder Popular para la Energía Eléctrica	2009	Igor Gavidia León	2019
Ministry of Electric Power	Ministerio del Poder Popular para la Energía Eléctrica	2009	Luis Motta Domínguez	2015 - 2019
Ministry of Electric Power	Ministerio del Poder Popular para la Energía Eléctrica	2009	Jesse Chacón	2013 - 2015
Ministry of Ecological Mining Development	Ministerio del Poder Popular de Desarrollo Minero Ecológico	2016	Gilberto Pinto Blanco	2019
Ministry of Water Attention	Ministerio del Poder Popular para la Atención de las Aguas	2018	Evelyn Vásquez	2018
Ministry of Industries and National Production	Ministerio del Poder Popular para Industrias y Producción Nacional	2018	Tareck El Aissami	2018
Ministry of Commerce	Ministerio del Poder Popular para el Comercio Nacional	2018	Eneida Laya Lugo	2019
Ministry of Commerce	Ministerio del Poder Popular para el Comercio Nacional	2018	William Contreras	2018 - 2019
Ministry of Commerce	Ministerio del Poder Popular para el Comercio Nacional	2018	Carlos Faría	2016 - 2017
Ministry of Commerce	Ministerio del Poder Popular para el Comercio Nacional	2018	Miguel Pérez Abad	2016 - 2016
Ministry of Commerce	Ministerio del Poder Popular para el Comercio Nacional	2018	José David Cabello	2015 - 2016
Ministry of Commerce	Ministerio del Poder Popular para el Comercio Nacional	2018	Isabel Delgado	2014 - 2015
Ministry of Commerce	Ministerio del Poder Popular para el Comercio Nacional	2018	Dante Rivas	2014
Ministry of Commerce	Ministerio del Poder Popular para el Comercio Nacional	2018	José Khan	2014
Ministry of Commerce	Ministerio del Poder Popular para el Comercio Nacional	2018	Alejandro Fleming	2013 - 2014

State Ministries:

Ministry of State for the New Peace Frontier	Ministerio del Estado para la Nueva Frontera de Paz	Gerardo Izquierdo Torres	2015

== See also ==
- Cabinet of Venezuela
- Presidency of Nicolás Maduro
- Cabinet of Juan Guaidó, rival cabinet in opposition to Maduro's cabinet between 2019 and 2023
