= Molero =

Molero is a surname. Notable people with the surname include:

- Antonio Molero (born 1968), Spanish actor
- Armando Molero (1899/1900–1971), Venezuelan musician
- Diego Alfredo Molero Bellavia, Venezuelan politician
- Federico Molero Giménez (1908–1969), Spanish physicist and inventor
- Juan Molero (born 1968), Puerto Rican former baseball player
- Xiomara Molero (born 1971), Puerto Rican former volleyball player
