= General-in-chief =

Military rank

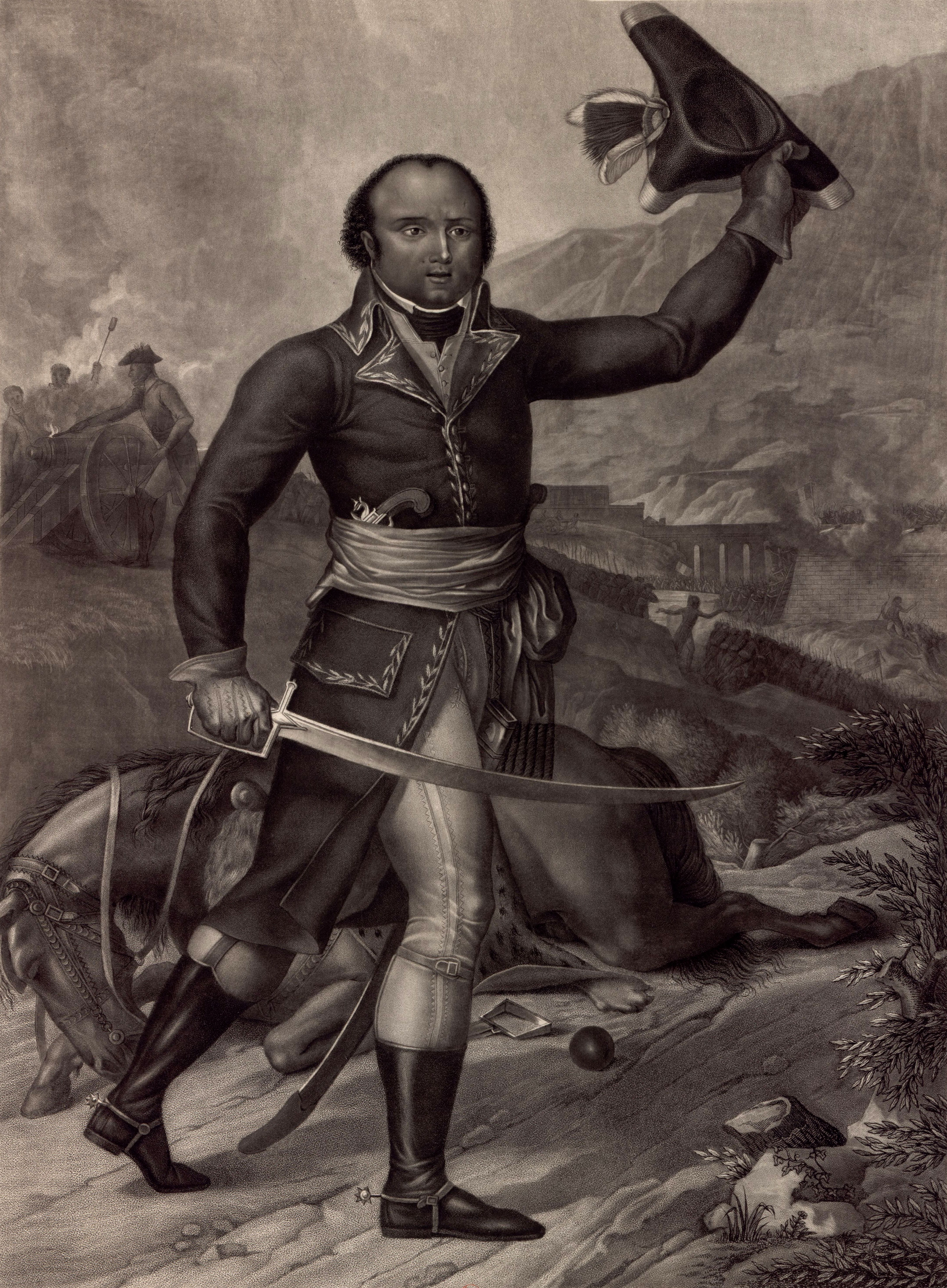
Thomas-Alexandre Dumas, a general-in-chief of the French Revolutionary Army

General-in-chief has been a military rank or title in various armed forces around the world.

== France ==
In the Kingdom of France, general-in-chief (French: général en chef) was an informal title used for lieutenant-generals which commanded other lieutenant-generals or for marshals in charge of a field army. Following the French Revolution, it became a title given to divisional generals of the French Revolutionary Army who commanded a field army. In the Revolutionary Army, generals-in-chief wore four stars on their shoulders boards instead to the three worn by divisional generals. The title of general-in-chief continued to be used as the Revolutionary Army was transformed into the French Imperial Army in 1804 but was abolished in 1812. Following the Bourbon Restoration in France in 1815 its use was restored before ultimately being abolished in 1848.

== Russia ==
In Russia, general-in-chief (Russian: генера́л-анше́ф, romanized: generál-anshéf, originating from the French général en chef), was a full general rank in the Imperial Russian Army, the second highest rank, after the rank of marshal, in Russian military ranks (the 2nd grade of Table of Ranks). It was created in 1698 by Peter the Great. In 1798, the rank was divided into three equivalent ranks of general of the infantry, general of the cavalry and general of the artillery.

== United States ==
In the United States, the title "General in Chief" was used to refer to the commanding general of the United States Army, who was the Army's senior-most officer. Famous generals-in-chief were George Washington, Winfield Scott, Henry Halleck, George McClellan, and Ulysses S. Grant (Washington's title was commander-in-chief during the American Revolution, and he was only called the "Senior Officer of the Army" after he was president in the late 1790s). The position of "general-in-chief," not the commanding general of the United States Army, was abolished with the creation of the title of chief of staff in 1903 — the Chief of Staff of the United States Army is the modern-day equivalent, although the current position is not responsible for commanding military forces in the field, as the generals-in-chief did in the 19th century. The rank of "General of the Armies of the United States" was conferred upon General John J. Pershing in 1919 and to Lieutenant General George Washington (posthumously) in 1975 by acts of Congress. Washington's date of rank was retroactively dated to 1799, so that he will always be the senior ranking general of the United States Army.

=== Confederate States ===
On January 31, 1865, the 2nd Confederate States Congress established a “General in Chief of the Armies of the Confederate States”. General Robert E. Lee was appointed to the position on February 6 and served until the end of the American Civil War. During the entire time, Lee retained command of the Army of Northern Virginia, serving in both positions until he was paroled as a prisoner of war on April 12.

== Venezuela ==
General in chief General en jefe (Spanish)

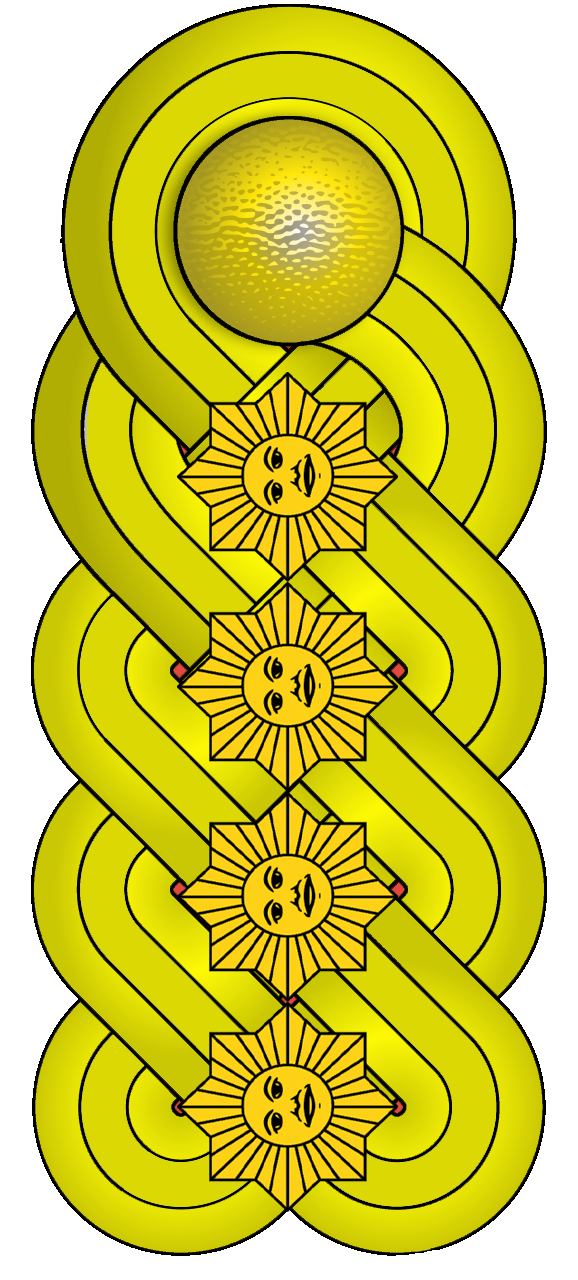
- Army and air force insignia
- Country: Venezuela
- Service branch: Venezuelan Army; Venezuelan Air Force
- Rank group: General officer
- Formation: 1823
- Next lower rank: Major general

Since the age of the independence war in Venezuela, the most senior officer is designated as general-in-chief (General en Jefe). From its creation, the rank was represented by three suns (equivalent to three-star rank), but with the creation in 2008 of the rank of major general, four suns (equivalent to four-star rank) are used.

From the 1940s until 2001 the rank was not used. In 2001 Divisional General Lucas Rincon Romero was promoted to general-in-chief. He was the first-ever active officer to be promoted after six decades.

Since 2001, 18 officers have been promoted to this rank or equivalent (13 from the Army including 3 posthumously, 1 from the Air Force, also posthumously, 2 from the Navy, 1 other naval recipient having been promoted to Admiral plus 1 posthumously):

Name	Component	Year	Note
General-in-Chief Lucas Rincón Romero	2001		
General-in-Chief Luis Acevedo Quintero	Air Force	2002	Promoted posthumously as the first and only General in Chief from the Air Force
General-in-Chief Jorge Luis García Carneiro	Army	2004	
Admiral Ramon Orlando Maniglia Ferreira	Navy	2005	First to be promoted to admiral, first-ever Venezuelan three-star admiral in two centuries after Luis Brion
General-in-Chief Raul Isaias Baduel	Army	2006	
General-in-Chief Gustavo Rangel Briceño	Army	2007	First four-sun promotion for the armed forces
General-in-Chief Carlos José Mata Figueroa	Army	2009	Second four-sun promotion for the armed forces, also promoted while being the Chief of the Operational Strategic Command
General-in-Chief Jesús González González	Army	2009	
General-in-Chief Almidien Moreno Acosta	Army	2010	Posthumously promoted
General-in-Chief Alberto Müller Rojas	Army	2010	Posthumously promoted
General-in-Chief Henry Rangel Silva	Army	2010	2nd to be promoted while in capacity as Commander of the OSC
Admiral-in-Chief Diego Alfredo Molero Bellavia	Navy	2012	First Navy four-sun flag officer to be appointed Minister of Defense, 1st to be promoted to Admiral in Chief
Admiral-in-Chief Carmen Meléndez	Navy	2013	First woman ever to be promoted to Admiral in Chief and first woman Minister of Defense in Venezuelan history
General-in-Chief Vladimir Padrino López	Army	2013	First to be promoted to General in Chief while being appointed as Commander of the OSC
General-in-Chief Jacinto Pérez Arcay	Army	2014	Oldest living general officer in Venezuelan history to be promoted to the rank
General-in-Chief Felix Antonio Velazquez	Army	2016	Promoted posthumously
Admiral-in-Chief Francisco de Miranda	Navy	2016	In honor of the bicentennial year since his death in prison and the 210th anniversary of his arrival in Venezuela, promoted posthumously
General-in-Chief Gustavo González López	Army (Bolivarian Intelligence Service)	2017	First SEBIN commandant to be promoted
Admiral-in-Chief Remigio Ceballos	Navy	2017	3rd to be promoted to Admiral in Chief and first naval officer to be appointed Commandant of the OSC

== See also ==
- General officer
