= Ministry of Defense (Venezuela) =

Government ministry of Venezuela

Ministry of People's Power for Defense
- Ministerio del Poder Popular para la Defensa
- Seal of the Ministry of People's Power for Defense

- Flag

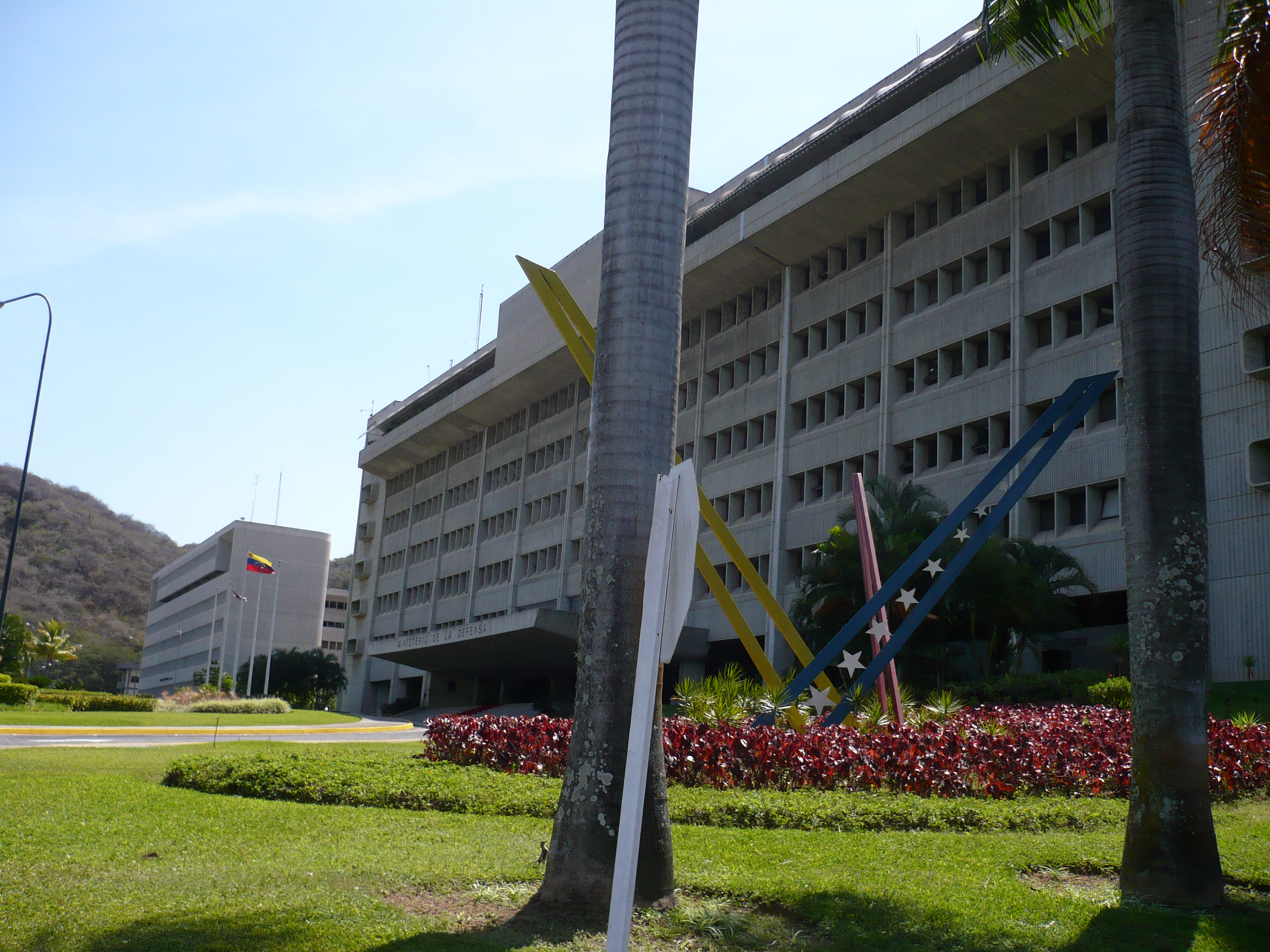
- Ministry of Defense in Caracas.

Ministry overview
- Formed: April 19, 1810; 216 years ago (as War and Navy Bureau)
- Jurisdiction: Government of Venezuela
- Headquarters: Caracas, Venezuela; 10°27′38.9″N 66°53′58.4″W
- Minister responsible: Gustavo González López

The Venezuelan Ministry of People's Power for Defense (Spanish: Ministerio del Poder Popular para la Defensa), abbreviated M.P.P.D., is the federal-level organization responsible for maintaining the Venezuelan armed forces. Since March 2026, the ministry has been headed by General Gustavo González López. The ministry coordinates numerous counter-narcotics operations (e.g., Operation Sierra through the CUFAN organ), helps perform various civil support and social development programs, and oversees the conventional military capabilities of Venezuela.

== History ==
- 1810 Established as War and Navy Bureau
- 1863 Ministry of War
- 1874 Ministry of War and Navy
- 1946 Became Ministry of National Defense
- 1951 Name amended to Ministry of Defense
- 2007 Renamed Ministry of People's Power for Defense by presidential decree

== Lists of ministers of defense ==
Ministers of defense of the Republic of Venezuela
#	Minister	Period		President
#	Minister	Beginning of term	End of term	President
1	Commander Lino de Clemente	1810	1814	Cristóbal Mendoza; Francisco Espejo; Francisco de Miranda; Simón Bolívar
2	Tomás Montilla	1817	1821	Simón Bolívar
3	Major General Pedro Briceño Méndez	1821	1825	Simón Bolívar
4	Lieutenant General Carlos Soublette	1825	1828	Simón Bolívar
5	Genera lRafael Urdaneta	1828	1829	Simón Bolívar
6	Lieutenant General Carlos Soublette	1829	1835	José Antonio Páez
7	Francisco Conde	1835	1835	José María Vargas
8	Francisco Hernáiz	1836	1837	José María Vargas; Andrés Navarte
9	Guillermo Smith	1837	1839	Carlos Soublette
10	General Rafael Urdaneta	1839	1847	José Antonio Páez; Carlos Soublette
11	Francisco Mejía	1847	1858	José Tadeo Monagas; José Gregorio Monagas; José Tadeo Monagas
12	Domingo Hernández	1858	1861	Julián Castro; Manuel Felipe Tovar
13	Lieutenant General Manuel Ezequiel Bruzual	1863	1864	Juan Crisóstomo Falcón
14	Major General José Ruperto Monagas	1864	1870	Juan Crisóstomo Falcón; José Ruperto Monagas
15	José Ignacio Pulido	1870	1874	Antonio Guzmán Blanco
16	Major General Joaquín Crespo	1874	1877	Antonio Guzmán Blanco
17	Major General Ramón Guerra	1892	1894	Joaquín Crespo
18	José Ignacio Pulido	1899	1902	Cipriano Castro
19	Ramón Guerra	1902	1903	Cipriano Castro
20	José María García Gómez	1903	1903	Cipriano Castro
21	Manuel Salvador Araujo	1903	1904	Cipriano Castro
22	Joaquin Garrido	1904	1905	Cipriano Castro
23	José María García Gómez	1905	1906	Cipriano Castro
24	Brigadier Diego Bautista Ferrer (acting)	1906	1906	Cipriano Castro
25	Manuel Salvador Araujo	1906	1907	Cipriano Castro
26	Major General Diego Bautista Ferrer	1907	1908	Cipriano Castro
27	Major General Régulo Olivares	1908	1911	Juan Vicente Gómez
28	Manuel Vicente Castro Zavala	1911	1912	Juan Vicente Gómez
29	Ismael Pereira Álvarez	1912	1913	Juan Vicente Gómez
30	Victorino Márquez Bustillos	1913	1914	Juan Vicente Gómez
31	Carlos Jiménez Rebolledo	1914	1929	Victorino Márquez Bustillos; Juan Vicente Gómez
32	Brigadier Tobías Utribe	1929	1931	Juan Bautista Pérez
33	Major General Eleazar López Contreras	1931	1935	Juan Vicente Gómez
34	Brigadier Antonio Chalboud Cardona	1935	1936	Eleazar López Contreras
35	Major General Isaias Medina Angarita	1936	1941	Eleazar López Contreras
36	Brigadier Antonio Chalboud Cardona	1941	1942	Isaias Medina Angarita
37	Major General Juan de Cios Celis Paredes	1942	1943	Isaias Medina Angarita
38	Carlos Meyer	1943	1943	Isaias Medina Angarita
39	Brigadier Manuel Morán	1943	1945	Isaias Medina Angarita
40	Major General Delfín Becerra	1945	1945	Isaias Medina Angarita
41	Lieutenant Colonel Carlos Delgado Chalbaud	1945	1948	Rómulo Betancourt; Rómulo Gallegos
42	Lieutenant Colonel Marcos Pérez Jiménez	1948	1953	Carlos Delgado Chalbaud; Germán Suárez Flamerich; Marcos Pérez Jiménez
43	Colonel Oscar Mazzei Carta	1953	1958	Marcos Pérez Jiménez
44	Major General Rómulo Fernández	1958	1958	Marcos Pérez Jiménez
45	Major General Marcos Pérez Jiménez (acting)	1958	1958	Marcos Pérez Jiménez
46	Major General Jesús Castro León	1958	1958	Rómulo Betancourt
47	Brigadier Josué López Hernández	1958	1961	Rómulo Betancourt
48	Brigadier Antonio Briceño Linares	1961	1964	Rómulo Betancourt
49	Major General Ramón Florencio Gómez	1964	1969	Raúl Leoni
50	Major General Marín García Villasmil	1969	1971	Rafael Caldera
51	Major General Jesús Carbonel Izquierdo	1971	1972	Rafael Caldera
52	Gustavo Pardi Dávila	1972	1974	Rafael Caldera
53	Homero Leal Torres	1974	1976	Carlos Andrés Pérez
54	Francisco Álvarez Torres	1979	1977	Carlos Andrés Pérez
55	Francisco Paredes Bello	1977	1979	Carlos Andrés Pérez; Luis Herrera Campins
56	Luis Rangel Burgoing	1979	1980	Luis Herrera Campins
57	Tomás Abreu Rescaniere	1980	1981	Luis Herrera Campins
58	Bernardo Leal Puchi	1981	1982	Luis Herrera Campins
59	Vicente Narváez Churión	1982	1983	Luis Herrera Campins
60	Humberto Alcalde Álvarez	1983	1984	Luis Herrera Campins; Jaime Lusinchi
61	Andrés Brito Martínez	1984	1986	Jaime Lusinchi
62	José Cardozo Grimaldi	1986	1987	Jaime Lusinchi
63	Major General Eliodoro Guerrero	1987	1988	Jaime Lusinchi
64	Major General Italo del Valle Alliegro	1988	1989	Jaime Lusinchi; Carlos Andrés Pérez
65	Major General Filmo López Uzcátegui	1989	1990	Carlos Andrés Pérez
66	Héctor Jurado Toro	1990	1991	Carlos Andrés Pérez
67	Fernándo Ochoa Antich	1991	1992	Carlos Andrés Pérez
68	Iván Jiménez Sánchez	1992	1993	Carlos Andrés Pérez; Octavio Lepage; Ramón José Velásquez
69	Radamés Muñoz León	1993	1993	Ramón José Velásquez
70	Rafael Montero Ravette	1993	1995	Ramón José Velásquez; Rafael Caldera
71	Moisés Orozco Graterol	1995	1996	Rafael Caldera
72	Pedro Valencia Vivas	1996	1997	Rafael Caldera
73	Rear Admiral (upper half); Tito Rincón	1997	1999	Rafael Caldera
74	Major General Raúl Salazar	1999	1999	Hugo Chávez
75	Major General Ismael Hurtado	1999	2000	Hugo Chávez
76	Major General José Vicente Rangel	2000	2002	Hugo Chávez
77	Lieutenant General Lucas Rincón Romero	2002	2002	Hugo Chávez
78	Major General José Luis Prieto	2002	2004	Hugo Chávez
79	Lieutenant General Jorge Luis García Carneiro	2004	2005	Hugo Chávez
80	Vice Admiral Orlando Maniglia	2005	2006	Hugo Chávez
81	General Raúl Baduel	2006	2007	Hugo Chávez
82	General Gustavo Rangel Briceño	2007	2009	Hugo Chávez
83	Lieutenant General Ramón Carrizales	2009	2010	Hugo Chávez
84	General Carlos Mata Figueroa	2010	2012	Hugo Chávez
85	General Henry Rangel Silva	2012	2012	Hugo Chávez
86	Admiral Diego Molero	2012	5 July 2013	Hugo Chávez; Nicolás Maduro
87	Admiral Carmen Meléndez	5 July 2013	24 October 2014	Nicolás Maduro
88	General Vladimir Padrino López	24 October 2014	18 March 2026	Nicolás Maduro; Delcy Rodríguez
89	General Gustavo González López	18 March 2026	Incumbent	Delcy Rodríguez

== See also ==
- Cabinet of Venezuela
