= Néstor Reverol =

Venezuelan politician

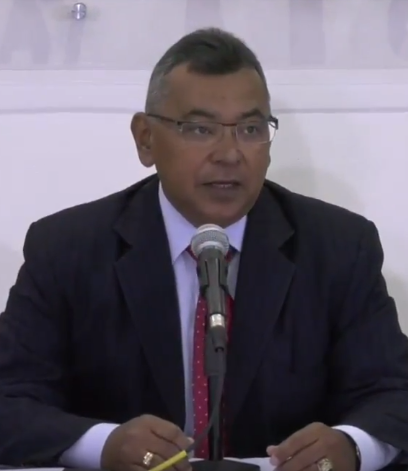
- Reverol in 2018

President of Corpozulia
- In office 23 April 2024 – 12 August 2025
- President: Nicolás Maduro
- Preceded by: Federico Guzmán Bornia
- Succeeded by: Francisco Ameliach

Minister of Electric Power
- In office 25 October 2020 – 22 April 2024
- President: Nicolás Maduro
- Preceded by: Freddy Brito Maestre
- Succeeded by: Jorge Elieser Márquez

Minister of the Interior, Justice and Peace
- In office 2 August 2016 – 25 October 2020
- President: Nicolás Maduro
- Preceded by: Gustavo González López
- Succeeded by: Carmen Meléndez
- In office 5 October 2012 – 3 April 2013
- President: Hugo Chávez; Nicolás Maduro
- Preceded by: Tareck El Aissami
- Succeeded by: Miguel Rodríguez Torres

Administrator of the Federal Dependencies
- In office 2 August 2016 – 25 October 2020
- President: Nicolás Maduro
- Preceded by: Gustavo González López
- Succeeded by: Carmen Meléndez

Commanding General of the Bolivarian National Guard
- In office 27 October 2014 – 8 July 2016
- President: Nicolás Maduro
- Preceded by: Gabriel Oviedo Colmenares
- Succeeded by: Antonio Benavides Torres

Personal details
- Born: October 28, 1964 (age 61) Cabimas, Venezuela
- Party: United Socialist Party of Venezuela

Military service
- Allegiance: Venezuela

Néstor Luis Reverol Torres (born 28 October 1964) is a Venezuelan military officer and politician who served as President of Corpozulia from 2024 to 2025. A member of the United Socialist Party of Venezuela, he previously held the position of Minister of the People's Power for Interior Relations and Justice of Venezuela and Commander General of the National Guard of Venezuela. On 3 August 2016, he was appointed as interior minister by President Nicolás Maduro.

== Education ==
Reverol was born in the coastal city of Maracaibo, capital of the Zulia state. He studied at the Military Academy of the National Guard, where he obtained his Bachelor of Science in Military Arts Degree in 1986. He later attended the School of the Americas in Fort Benning, undergoing training with the US Army in 1996.

== Controversy ==
=== Drug trafficking ===
In 2016, the United States government alleged that Reverol was involved in drug trafficking when he was head of the Oficina Nacional Antidrogas (ONA).

=== Sanctions ===
Reverol has been sanctioned by several countries and is banned from entering neighboring Colombia. The Colombian government maintains a list of people banned from entering Colombia or subject to expulsion; as of January 2019, the list had 200 people with a "close relationship and support for the Nicolás Maduro regime".

In July 2017, thirteen senior officials, including Reverol, of the Venezuelan government associated with the 2017 Venezuelan Constituent Assembly elections were sanctioned by the United States for their role in undermining democracy and human rights.

Canada sanctioned 40 Venezuelan officials, including Reverol, in September 2017. The sanctions were for behaviors that undermined democracy after at least 125 people will killed in the 2017 Venezuelan protests and "in response to the government of Venezuela's deepening descent into dictatorship". Canadians were banned from transactions with the 40 individuals, whose Canadian assets were frozen.

The European Union sanctioned seven Venezuela officials, including Reverol, on 18 January 2018, singling them out as being responsible for deteriorating democracy in the country. The sanctioned individuals were prohibited from entering the nations of the European Union, and their assets were frozen.

In March 2018, Panama sanctioned 55 public officials, including Reverol, and Switzerland implemented sanctions, freezing the assets of seven ministers and high officials, including Reverol, due to human rights violations and deteriorating rule of law and democracy.

On 20 April 2018, the Mexican Senate froze the assets of officials of the Maduro administration, including Reverol, and prohibited them from entering Mexico.
