= Cabinet of Carlos Andrés Pérez =

Cabinet of Carlos Andrés Pérez may refer to:

- First presidency of Carlos Andrés Pérez
- Second presidency of Carlos Andrés Pérez
