= Cabinet of Rafael Caldera =

Cabinet of Rafael Caldera may refer to:

- Second presidency of Rafael Caldera
- First presidency of Rafael Caldera
