= Carmen Meléndez =

Venezuelan politician and Navy admiral

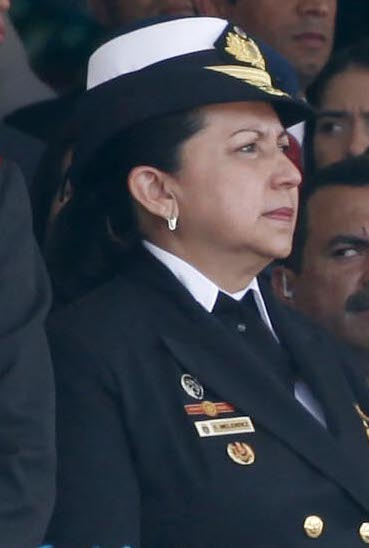
- Meléndez in 2014

Mayor of Libertator Municipality of Caracas
- Incumbent
- Assumed office 2 December 2021
- Preceded by: Caryslia Rodríguez

Minister of Interior and Justice
- In office 25 October 2020 – 19 August 2021
- President: Nicolas Maduro
- Preceded by: Néstor Reverol
- Succeeded by: Remigio Ceballos
- In office 25 October 2014 – 9 March 2015
- President: Nicolas Maduro
- Preceded by: Miguel Rodríguez Torres
- Succeeded by: Gustavo González López

Governor of Lara
- In office 16 October 2017 – 25 October 2020
- Preceded by: Henri Falcón
- Succeeded by: Adolfo Pereira Antique

Minister of Office of the Presidency and Monitoring of Government Management
- In office 10 March 2015 – 8 September 2015
- Preceded by: Carlos Osorio
- Succeeded by: Jesús Salazar

Minister of Defense
- In office 5 July 2013 – 25 October 2014
- President: Nicolás Maduro
- Preceded by: Diego Molero
- Succeeded by: Vladimir Padrino López

Personal details
- Born: 3 November 1961 (age 64) Barinas, Venezuela
- Party: United Socialist Party of Venezuela (PSUV)
- Children: 3

Carmen Teresa Meléndez Rivas (born 3 November 1961) is a Venezuelan politician and Navy admiral. She was Minister of Interior and Justice from 25 October 2014 to 9 March 2015, and chief of staff in President Nicolás Maduro's cabinet for nearly six months from March to September 2015. After a governorship in Lara (2017–2020), she headed the Interior Ministry for the second time, from October 2020 to August 2021.

== Political career ==
Meléndez was the Deputy Minister of Education of the Ministry of Defense. On July 3, 2012, the president of Venezuela, Hugo Chavez, promoted her to the rank of Vice Admiral. Melendez was the first Venezuelan woman to receive this distinction in after being named Commander of General Staff of the Bolivarian Armed Forces. On 13 October, she was named Minister of People's Power of the Office by President Hugo Chavez and confirmed by national decree on 15 October. On 21 April 2013, during a national radio and television, she was reaffirmed as Minister of Management the Bolivarian Government of Venezuela for the government of Nicolas Maduro. On 3 July 2013 the president of the republic amounts to admiral in chief and July 5, 2013, the appointed Minister of Defense, the first woman to hold both charges in the history of Venezuela.

== Sanctions ==
Meléndez has been sanctioned by several countries and is banned from entering neighboring Colombia. The Colombian government maintains a list of people banned from entering Colombia or subject to expulsion; as of January 2019, the list had 200 people with a "close relationship and support for the Nicolás Maduro regime".

=== United States ===
On 9 August 2017, the United States Department of the Treasury placed sanctions on Meléndez for her position in the 2017 Constituent Assembly of Venezuela where she is tasked with the street government command.

=== Canada ===
Canada sanctioned Meléndez on 22 September 2017 due to alleged "rupture of Venezuela's constitutional order."

=== Panama ===
On 29 March 2018, Meléndez was sanctioned by the Panamanian government for her alleged involvement with "money laundering, financing of terrorism and financing the proliferation of weapons of mass destruction".
