= Jorge Giordani =

Venezuelan politician (born 1940)

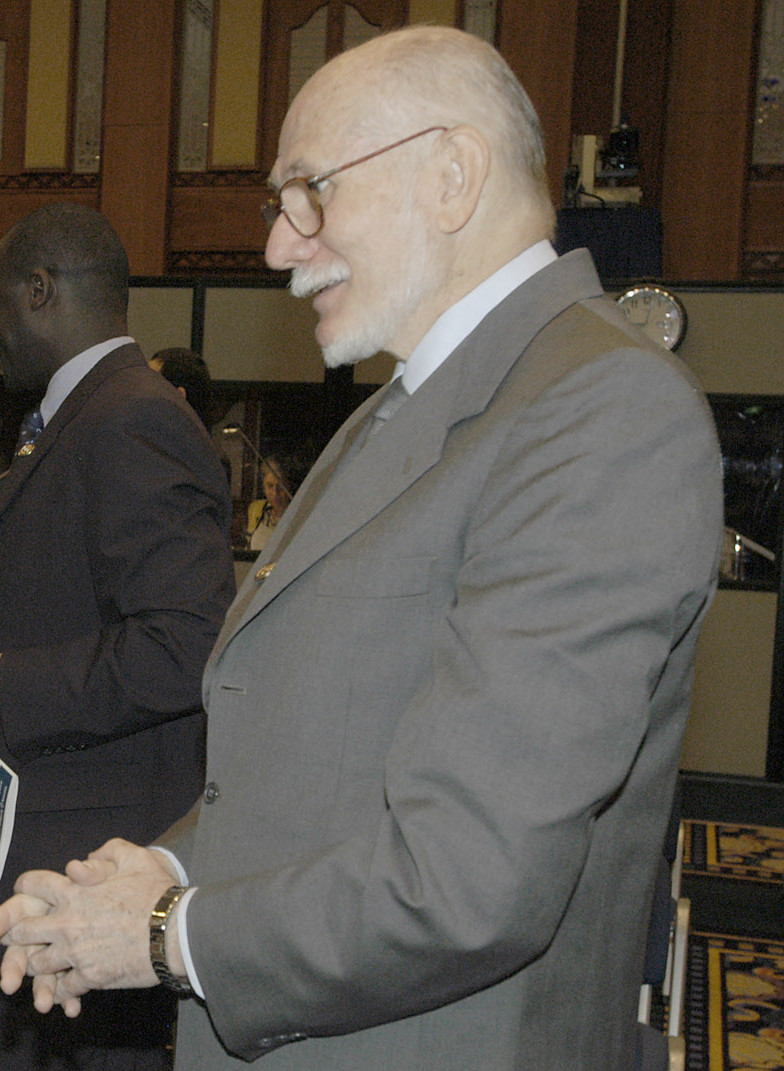
- Giordani in 2003

Minister of Economy and Finance
- In office 2010 – April 2013
- President: Hugo Chávez, Nicolás Maduro
- Preceded by: Alí Rodríguez Araque
- Succeeded by: Nelson Merentes

Minister of People's Power for Planning
- In office February 2009 – June 2014
- President: Hugo Chávez, Nicolás Maduro
- Preceded by: Haiman El Troudi
- Succeeded by: Ricardo José Menéndez Prieto
- In office April 2003 – January 2008
- President: Hugo Chávez
- Preceded by: Felipe Perez Marti
- Succeeded by: Haiman El Troudi
- In office February 1999 – May 2002
- President: Hugo Chávez
- Preceded by: Teodoro Petkoff
- Succeeded by: Felipe Perez Marti

Personal details
- Born: 30 June 1940 (age 85) San Francisco de Macorís, Dominican Republic
- Party: Communist
- Education: Lyceum Andrés Bello
- Alma mater: Central University of Venezuela (BEng); University of Bologna (MEng); University of Sussex (Ph. D.)

Jorge Antonio Giordani Cordero (born 30 June 1940) is a Venezuelan politician and Marxian economist.

== Early life and education ==
Jorge Giordani was born on June 30, 1940, in the city of San Francisco de Macorís in the Dominican Republic. His parents were both immigrants; his father from Italy and his mother from Spain. Both had left Europe in the wake of the Spanish Civil War, in which Jorge's father had fought on the Republican side as part of the Garibaldi Battalion. In 1942, Jorge and his family moved to Caracas, Venezuela. Jorge and his mother became naturalised citizens of the country, while his father retained his Italian citizenship. Jorge's primary-level education took place at the Escuela Experimental Venezuela, his secondary education at the Lyceum Andrés Bello. After graduating high school, he pursued a Bachelors in Electrical Engineering at the Central University of Venezuela, where he joined the Communist Party of Venezuela in protest of Rafael Trujillo's dictatorship in the Dominican Republic. He completed a Masters at the University of Bologna in Italy, and went on to receive a Ph. D. in Planning and Development from the University of Sussex in the United Kingdom.

== Career ==
=== Academia ===
He returned to the Central University of Venezuela to teach classes in Engineering. He was still a professor in 1992 at the time of Hugo Chávez's attempted coup d'état. In a 2001 interview, Giordani described himself as entirely supportive of the attempt, and was introduced to Chávez in the aftermath by Adina Bastidas. In 1999, he was approached to take the position of Minister of Planning under the Chávez presidency.

=== Venezuelan government, 1999-2014 ===
Giordani served several separate terms in the Ministry of planning: from February 1999 to May 2002; from April 2003 to January 2008; and from February 2009 until June 2014, with a week-long replacement from November 25 to December 5, 2012, by Ramón Antonio Yánez Marro. He also took up the role of Minister of Finance from 2010 to 2013.

He was nicknamed "the Monk" in reference to his austere lifestyle, and was one of Chávez's closest advisers and the chief architect of the country's state-led economic system. While in office, he published a book, The Venezuelan Transition to Socialism, in 2001. The work is a retrospective on the 20th century history of Venezuela.

Political opponents accused Giordani of being a "Soviet-era dinosaur" and placed upon him a large amount of the blame for the country's 2013–present economic crisis in Venezuela. In 2013, Chávez's successor, Nicolás Maduro replaced Giordani in his role as Minister of Finance with Nelson Merentes. Criticism of his policies mounted, and in June 2014, Giordani was removed from his position on the board of the Central Bank of Venezuela.

A week later, on June 17, 2014, he was dismissed from his position as Minister of Planning . He was replaced as Minister of Planning by the former Minister of Education, Ricardo José Menéndez Prieto.

=== Since 2014 ===
The day after his dismissal from government, Giordani published a letter in which he criticized Maduro and his government, accusing him of demonstrating a lack of leadership and of squandering Chávez's legacy through corruption, government bureaucracy and "fiscal nymphomania".

As of January 2023, Giordani has continued to speak out against the Maduro presidency in the years since, including a denouncement of the loss of $300bn to corruption in 2016.
