= Miguel Rodríguez Torres =

Venezuelan military officer

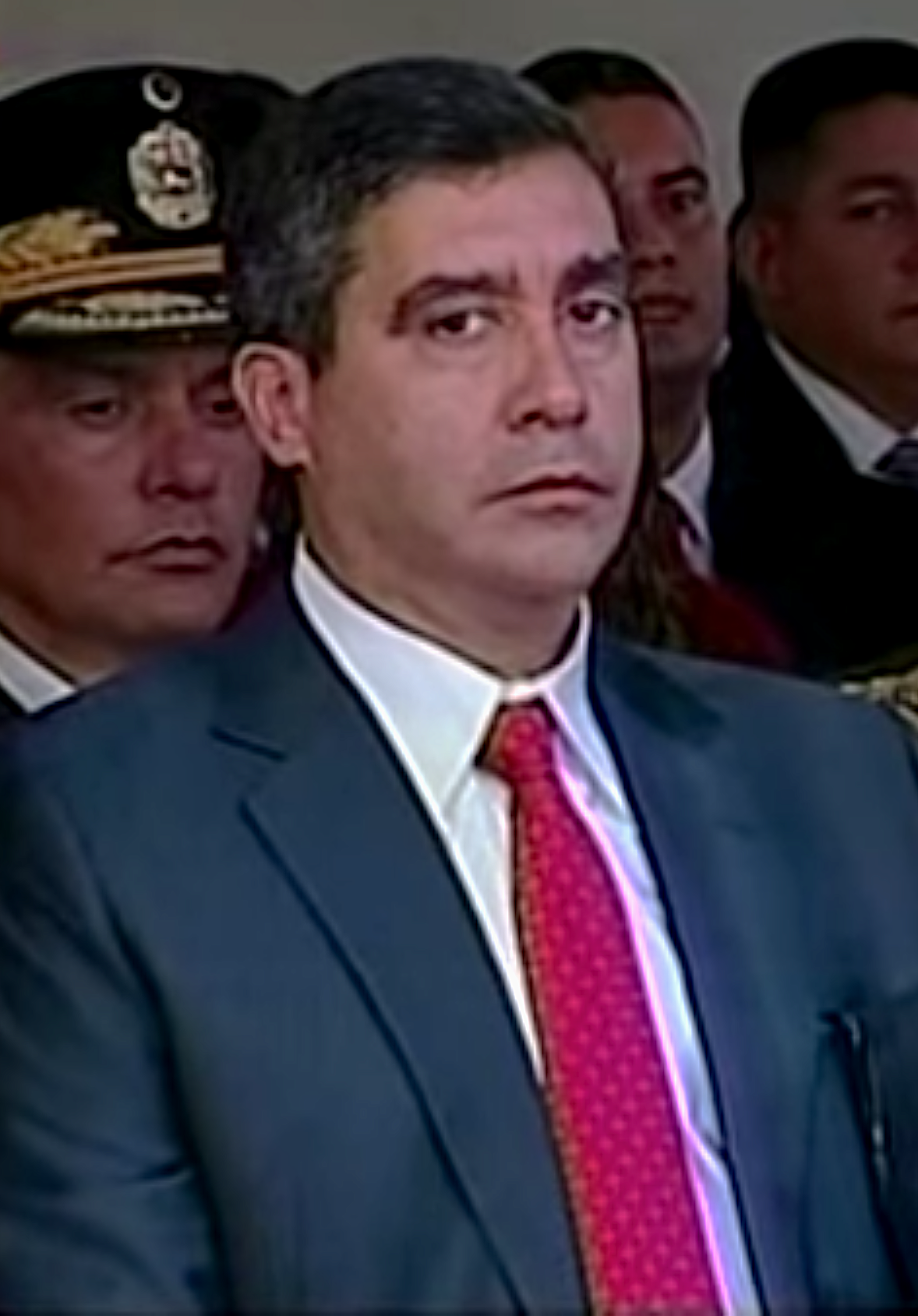
- Miguel Rodríguez Torres at a military ceremony in 2014

Director of the Bolivarian National Intelligence Service
- In office 2002 – April 2013
- Succeeded by: Manuel Bernal Martínez

Minister of the Popular Power for Interior, Justice and Peace
- In office 22 April 2013 – 24 October 2014
- President: Nicolás Maduro
- Preceded by: Néstor Reverol
- Succeeded by: Carmen Meléndez

Personal details
- Born: January 21, 1962 (age 64)
- Education: Military Academy of the Venezuelan Army

Military service
- Branch/service: Venezuelan Army
- Rank: Major general

Miguel Eduardo Rodríguez Torres (born 21 January 1964) is a Venezuelan politician and former military officer who has served as Minister of Interior, Justice and Peace of Venezuela from 2013, until he was replaced by Carmen Meléndez on 24 October 2014.

== Military career ==
In 1980, he attended the Military Academy of Venezuela.

=== 1992 coup attempt ===
During the February 1992 coup attempt carried out by Hugo Chávez, Rodríguez Torres took part in the conspiracy. Chávez's goal, assisted by Cuban president Fidel Castro, was to capture and kill President Carlos Andrés Pérez and then establish former president Rafael Caldera into the presidency. Rodríguez Torres, an army captain at the time, was given the task of capturing and killing President Pérez after another coup conspirator refused to participate after discovering that Rafael Caldera would be placed as president.

President Pérez, who had recently arrived from Davos, learned of the coup threat upon his return, leaving the airport in a concealed fashion which surprised Rodríguez Torres, who quickly pursued the fleeing president with his fellow militants, firing at his vehicle. Ultimately, the coup failed and the conspirators, including Rodríguez Torres, were imprisoned. After being jailed for 25 months, Rodríguez Torres was released in 1994 through an act of amnesty by Caldera, who had just been elected president.

== Political career ==
Rodríguez Torres was director of the Bolivarian National Intelligence Service, Venezuela's intelligence services, from 2002 to 2013.

Following the election of Nicolás Maduro into the presidency in April 2013, Rodríguez Torres was made the Minister of the Popular Power for Interior, Justice and Peace. After the murder of former Miss Venezuela Mónica Spear, an incident that provoked widespread outrage, he declared there would be "adjustments to police structures and operations" and "to existing anti-crime plans"

Under his ministerial oversight during the 2014 Venezuelan protests, he ordered repressive acts against peaceful protesters, with two of his own close associates killing the first victims of the protest movement on 12 February 2014, causing further unrest.

Following an October 2014 incident in which multiple colectivo members were killed during a CICPC raid, members of colectivos called for Rodríguez Torres to be removed from his interior minister position. Days later on 24 October 2014, Rodríguez Torres was removed from his position during a state-run television program.

Among other Venezuelan officials, he is banned from entering Colombia. The Colombian government maintains a list of people banned from entering Colombia or subject to expulsion; as of January 2019, the list had 200 people with a "close relationship and support for the Nicolás Maduro regime".

== Dissent ==
As of 2017, Rodríguez Torres had been an increasingly vocal critic of the government, alongside dissident chief state prosecutor Luisa Ortega Díaz. In May, news outlets reported that he was considering a bid for the presidency, offering a 'third way' or middle ground between the opposition and Chavismo. In June 2017, he expressed his opposition to the presidential initiative to convene a National Constituent Assembly, and called instead for the scheduling of new elections.

=== Arrest ===
On 13 March 2018, Rodríguez Torres, who had spoken the previous day at an opposition rally, was arrested by SEBIN agents and brought to the Dirección General de Contrainteligencia Militar headquarters in Sucre, Miranda. The Bolivarian government stated that the general had attempted to sow discord among the Venezuelan armed forces.

=== Release ===
Rodríguez Torres was released from prison by Venezuelan authorities on 21 January 2023 and left the country. Rodríguez thanked former Spanish Prime Minister José Luis Rodríguez Zapatero for his efforts over three years to secure his release and exile from the country to Madrid.

=== Crimes against humanity ===
In 2020, he was mentioned as one of those responsible in a report presented by the United Nations on crimes against humanity committed in his country. On 5 May 2025, Dulce Bravo, along with Thabata Molina and the organization Manos Limpias (Clean Hands), filed a lawsuit against Miguel Rodríguez Torres for alleged crimes against humanity. This lawsuit was dismissed by the Spanish National Court.

== See also ==
- Political prisoners in Venezuela
