= Juan Molero =

Puerto Rican baseball player

Juan Molero was born on April 18, 1968. He was born in Puerto Nuevo, Puerto Rico.

Molero was signed by the Boston Red Sox in 1987 as an undrafted free agent. He was quickly assigned to a single A affiliate of the Red Sox, the Greensboro Hornets. The man who scouted him was Felix Maldonado. He was a third baseman for his brief, but successful baseball career.

In his first year, his stats were jampacked. He played in 90 games and had 310 plate appearances. He had 62 hits, 15 extra base hits, 28 RBIs, and 3 home runs. He had 27 walks and only 56 strikeouts. He had a .227 batting average and a .308 slugging percentage. He had 84 total bases. He was able to play a season with future Hall of Fame pitcher Curt Schilling.

He was quickly moved up to A+ league Red Sox affiliate, Lynchburg, and his production dropped slightly, but not much. He only played 55 games in 1988, and he had 22 hits in this year. He scored 12 runs this year. His batting average dropped to .144 and his slugging dropped to .170.

In his third year in the minor leagues, he remained with Lynchburg. He played in 65 games this year, and he had 31 hits and scored 20 runs. He got more adjusted to the pitching of A+ league. This year his batting average was .167 and his slugging average was .237. He also made his sole pitching appearances this year. He played in two games and finished one. He had a 9.00 ERA.

In midst of a scandal, he was released by the Red Sox, and never picked up again. He played in a three-year baseball career, and advanced to A+.
