= Federico Molero Giménez =

Spanish physicist and inventor

Federico Molero Giménez (11 January 1908, Almería – 1969, Madrid) was a Spanish physicist and inventor, who made pioneering studies of the potential of solar energy for human use. During the Spanish Civil War, he played an important part in the two year Republican defense of Madrid through his work on the city's water supply channels, and urban defenses.
