= Gustavo González López =

Venezuelan politician and military officer (born 1960)

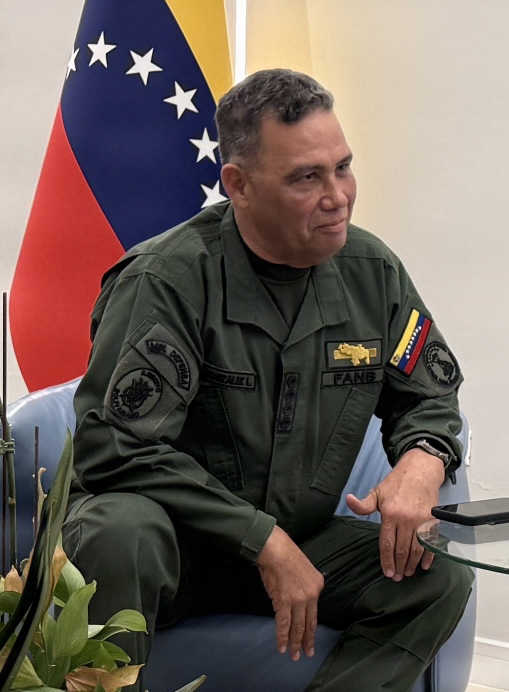
- López in 2026

Minister of Defense
- Incumbent
- Assumed office 18 March 2026
- President: Delcy Rodríguez (acting)
- Preceded by: Vladimir Padrino López

Commander of the Presidential Honor Guard
- In office 6 January 2026 – 18 March 2026
- President: Delcy Rodríguez (acting)
- Preceded by: Javier Marcano Tábata

Director of Military Counterintelligence
- In office 6 January 2026 – 18 March 2026
- President: Delcy Rodríguez (acting)
- Preceded by: Javier Marcano Tábata
- Succeeded by: Gérman Gómez Lárez

Director of SEBIN
- In office 30 April 2019 – 14 October 2024
- President: Nicolás Maduro
- Preceded by: Manuel Cristopher Figuera
- Succeeded by: Alexis Rodríguez Cabello
- In office 17 February 2014 – 30 October 2018
- President: Nicolás Maduro
- Preceded by: Manuel Bernal Martínez
- Succeeded by: Manuel Cristopher Figuera

Minister of the Interior, Justice and Peace
- In office 9 March 2015 – 3 August 2016
- President: Nicolás Maduro
- Preceded by: Carmen Meléndez
- Succeeded by: Néstor Reverol

Commander of the Bolivarian Militia
- In office 30 July 2011 – 27 July 2013
- President: Hugo Chávez; Nicolás Maduro
- Succeeded by: José Briceño Moreno

Personal details
- Born: Gustavo Enrique González López; 2 November 1960 (age 65) Caracas, Fourth Republic of Venezuela
- Party: PSUV

Military service
- Branch: Venezuelan Army
- Service years: 1986–present
- Rank: Major General
- Commands: SEBIN (2014–2018)

Gustavo Enrique González López (born 2 November 1960) is a Venezuelan military officer who has served as Minister of Defense since 2026. He was formerly the director of the Bolivarian National Intelligence Service (SEBIN).

== Career ==
Gustavo González López graduated from the Military Academy in 1982, with prominent classmates including Bolivar state governor, Francisco Rangel Gómez. Between January and May 1991, Lopez Gonzalez was sent to the School of the Americas at Fort Benning, in Georgia for a "Psychological Operations" and Advanced Officer Training course by the US Army.

=== Chávez government ===
López González joined the Venezuelan cabinet in 2006 where he served as president of Metro de Caracas and Los Teques Metro. In December 2008, President Hugo Chávez appointed him commander of the 5th Jungle Infantry Division, Operation Theatre No. 5 and Garrison Ciudad Bolivar. He was made the commanding general of the Bolivarian Militia on 30 July 2011. He also served as secretary of the Security and Intelligence Unit Electric System.

=== Maduro government ===
Since 17 February 2014, following the controversial shootings during the 2014 Venezuelan protests in Candelaria which left Bassil Da Costa shot dead, he was appointed Director of Bolivarian Intelligence Service (SEBIN) and president of Strategic Centre for Security and Protection Patria.

González López was one of seven officials that received targeted sanctions by the government of Barack Obama for alleged human rights abuses. Following the announcement of sanctions, González López was promoted to Minister of Popular Power for Interior, Justice and Peace on 15 March 2015 by President Nicolás Maduro, who stated "I have decided to appoint Major General González López Minister of Interior, Justice and Peace to go with his award of the American empire to secure peace in the country, citizen and national security".

On 1 July 2017, President Nicolás Maduro named González López general-in-chief of the Venezuelan army. In 2018, González López allegedly faced scrutiny within the Maduro government following a drone attack targeting Maduro and the death of Fernando Albán Salazar, who died in SEBIN custody at the agency's headquarters. He was subsequently replaced by Manuel Cristopher Figuera.

Following the 2019 Venezuelan uprising against Maduro, which saw SEBIN director Cristopher Figuera participate as a plotter, González López was named Director of SEBIN for the second time by Maduro.

He was replaced by Major General Alexis Rodriguez Cabello as director of SEBIN on 14 October 2024.

=== Rodríguez government ===
González became Minister of Defense on 18 March 2026, succeeding General Vladimir Padrino López.

== Sanctions ==
González has been sanctioned by several countries.

The United States sanctioned González for his role in the 2014 Venezuelan protests. U.S. President Barack Obama issued a presidential order in 2015 declaring Venezuela a "threat to its national security" and ordered the United States Department of the Treasury to freeze property and assets of seven Venezuelan officials. The United States held the seven individuals, including González, responsible for "excesses committed in the repression of the demonstrations of February 2014 that left at least 43 dead" including "erosion of human rights guarantees, persecution of political opponents, restrictions on press freedom, violence and human rights abuses in response to anti-government protests, arbitrary arrests and arrests of anti-government protesters, and significant public corruption" according to BBC Mundo.

Canada sanctioned 40 Venezuelan officials, including González, in September 2017. The sanctions were for behaviors that undermined democracy after at least 125 people will killed in the 2017 Venezuelan protests and "in response to the government of Venezuela's deepening descent into dictatorship". Canadians were banned from transactions with the 40 individuals, whose Canadian assets were frozen.

The European Union sanctioned seven Venezuela officials, including González, on 18 January 2018, singling them out as being responsible for deteriorating democracy in the country. The sanctioned individuals were prohibited from entering the nations of the European Union, and their assets were frozen.

In March 2018, Panama sanctioned 55 public officials, including González, and Switzerland implemented sanctions, freezing the assets of seven ministers and high officials, including González, due to human rights violations and deteriorating rule of law and democracy.

== See also ==
- Ministry of Popular Power for Interior, Justice and Peace
- Corruption in Venezuela
- Crime in Venezuela
- SEBIN
