= Blanca Eekhout =

Venezuelan politician

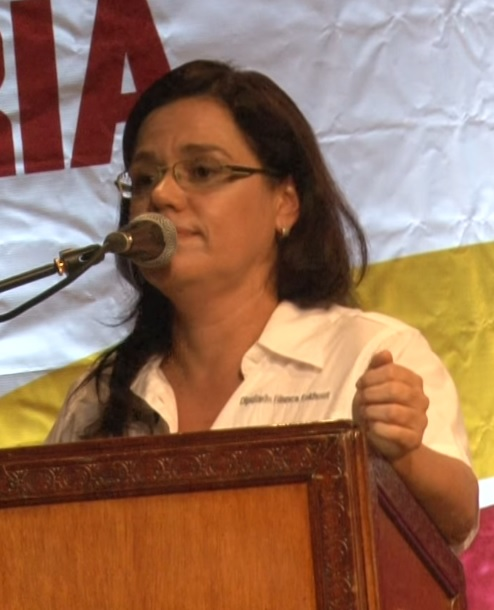

Minister for Women and Gender Equality
- In office 1 October 2016 – 14 June 2018
- President: Nicolás Maduro
- Preceded by: Gladys Requena

Second Vice President of the National Assembly
- In office 5 January 2011 – 5 January 2015

Deputy of the National Assembly
- In office 5 January 2011 – 5 January 2016

Personal details
- Born: 6 January 1968 (age 58) Acarigua, Portuguesa, Venezuela
- Party: United Socialist Party of Venezuela (PSUV)

Blanca Rosa Eekhout Gómez (born 6 January 1968) is a Venezuelan politician who has been Minister for Women and Gender Equality since 2016. She was Minister of Communication and Information between 2009 and 2010, and held the position of Second Vice President of the National Assembly during the 2011-2015 legislative period. She has also been president of VTV and ViVe, and was a cofounder of Catia TVe in 2001.

== Biography ==
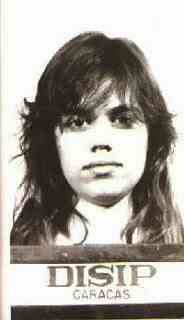
Blanca Eekhout's DISIP mugshot, 1989

Eekhout attended José Antonio Páez High School in her hometown of Acarigua, and graduated from the Central University of Venezuela with a Bachelor of Arts specialized in cinema. She was arrested in 1989 for instigating lootings during the Caracazo.

She entered the United Socialist Party of Venezuela (PSUV), becoming close to president Hugo Chávez. She replaced Jesse Chacón as Minister of Communication and Information from 16 April 2009 until 2010.

In 2010, she was elected by her party to lead the candidacy in the Portuguesa state for the 2010 parliamentary elections, where she was elected as deputy. After holding her seat in 2011, she was designated as Second Vice President of the Assembly until January 2015. She is the national coordinator of the Great Patriotic Pole and sectorial vice president of Alliances and Social Movements of the PSUV. In 2016 she was named as Minister for Women and Gender Equality.
