= Isabel Iturria =

Venezuelan cardiologist and politician

Isabel Iturria is a Venezuelan cardiologist and politician. She was Minister of Venezuela.

== Career ==
She graduated from the Central University of Venezuela (with magna cum laude mention ) in 1991. Graduated as a specialist in Internal Medicine in 1995 and in Cardiology in 1998. She has a degree in Cardiology from the Autonomous University of Barcelona, Spain. She completed a Diploma in Public Health Management, a course in Hospital Administration and Health Services Management (Tokyo) and since 2007 he is a student of the Doctorate in Management Sciences at UNEFA. She was Director of the Hospital Management of the Ministry of Health between 2004 and 2006 and is President of the Fundación Hospital Cardiológico Infantil Latinoamericano Dr. Gilberto Rodríguez Ochoa from its creation in 2006 to the present.
