= Eduardo Piñate =

Venezuelan politician and historian

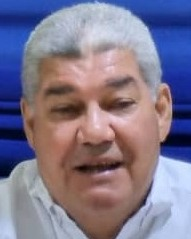
Eduardo Piñate

Eduardo Piñate (born 6 September, 1956 in San Fernando de Apure, Venezuela) is a Venezuelan teacher, historian and politician. He was appointed Minister of Education (MPPE) and sector vice president for the Social and Territorial Socialism of Venezuela. He was appointed into office on May 2, 2021 by President Nicolas Maduro. He has held other positions as Minister of People's Power for the Social Process of Work and elected as a Deputy of the National Assembly of Venezuela in the 2010 parliamentary elections. He has served as the Minister of Labour.

He was a member of the Socialist League of Venezuela before its merger in 2007 with United Socialist Party of Venezuela. Pinate is the founder of Units of Battle Hugo Chávez. He is known to be one of President Nicolás Maduro's trusted advisers.

== Biography ==
=== Education ===
Piñate was born in the city of San Fernando de Apure, in western Venezuela. He graduated in 1984 as a professor of history and social sciences at the former Pedagogical University Institute of Caracas, currently Universidad Pedagógica Experimental Libertador (UPEL). In 1987, he began a master's degree in political science at the Simón Bolívar University (USB), which he did not complete.

=== Political career ===
He was a member of the merged political party Socialist League (Venezuela) for years. There he was a member of the National Directorate. In 2000, he was the founder of the Bolivarian Socialist Force of Workers (FSBT) and national coordinator of the FSBT-Education. He was director of Promotion and Development of the Communal Power of the Mayor's Office of Caracas, from 2009 to 2011.

Those responsible for issuing Memorandum 2792 is an official document issued on October 11, 2018, by the Ministry of Labor in Venezuela. This instrument restructured labor relations in the public sector, eliminating collective bargaining agreements, flattening the salary scale, and setting the minimum wage as the base salary, which has generated constant protests due to the reduction of contractual benefits.

He was elected as a deputy in the National Assembly of Venezuela during the period 2011-2016, and then assumed in 2018. In 2021, after the death of Aristóbulo Izturiz, he was appointed as Minister of Popular Power for Education and sectoral vice president for Social and Territorial Socialism of Venezuela.
