= Gabriela Jiménez Ramírez =

Venezuelan politician (born 1976)

Gabriela Servilia Jiménez Ramirez (born 19 August 1976) is a Venezuelan biologist and politician. She has been the Minister of Science and Technology since 6 June 2019.
