= Gladys Requena =

Venezuelan politician

Member of the 2017 Constituent National Assembly
- In office 4 August 2017 – 18 December 2020

Minister for Women and Gender Equality
- In office 28 April 2015 – 1 October 2016
- President: Nicolás Maduro
- Preceded by: Andreína Tarazón
- Succeeded by: Blanca Eekhout

Deputy of the National Assembly
- In office 5 January 2011 – 28 April 2015

Personal details
- Born: 9 November 1952 (age 73) Puerto Santo, Sucre, Venezuela
- Party: United Socialist Party of Venezuela (PSUV)
- Education: Universidad Pedagógica Experimental Libertador; Central University of Venezuela
- Profession: Literature professor
- Committees: Permanent Commission of Culture and Recreation

Gladys del Valle Requena (9 November 1952) is a Venezuelan politician. She served in the National Assembly until 2015, becoming the Minister for Women and Gender Equality under Nicolás Maduro. After serving in his cabinet, she became a member of the 2017 Constituent National Assembly. She has been sanctioned by the EU for her role in undermining the rule of law in the Venezuelan presidential crisis.

== Career ==
Requena moved to Vargas with her family looking for a better quality of life. She became a professor of Spanish and literature after graduating from the Instituto Pedagógico de Caracas in 1977. She graduated as a lawyer from the Central University of Venezuela in 1982, specializing in labor law.

She was deputy to the National Assembly for the Vargas State and the president of the parliamentary Permanent Commission of Culture and Recreation. She is also one of the founders of the Regional Institute for Women in Vargas (IREMUJER) and the Women's Network in Vargas in 1997, as well as member of the organizing commission of the Unitary Platform of Revolutionary Women in 2007 and the national commission for the National Women's Front in 2009.

Requena was a delegate in several conferences for the Women's International Democratic Federation (WIDF), such as the São Paulo Forum summit in Caracas, 2012, the WIDF Direction Committee in Brussels, 2009 and the Fifth WIDF Regional Conference in Ecuador, 2009. From 2011 to 2014 she was the National Assembly delegate to the Inter-Parliamentary Union in six summits in Panama City, Bern, Kampala, Quebec City and Geneva. She was member of the 2017 Constituent National Assembly.

== International Sanctions ==
On June 29, 2020, she was sanctioned by the EU, effectively freezing her assets in and barring her from traveling to the EU jurisdictions, citing her "persistent actions undermining democracy, the rule of law and respect for human rights". The EU specifically cited her role in stripping Juan Guaidó of his parliamentary immunity.

== Honors ==
- June 27 Second Class Order. Education Ministry. 1997.
- Venezuelan Heroines Order. Republic's presidency. 2009.
- Arminio Borjas Single Class Order. Lawyers College Federation. 2009.
