= Manuel Quevedo =

Venezuelan politician

Manuel Salvador Quevedo Fernández (born Venezuela) is a Venezuelan military general and politician. He was Minister of Petroleum of Venezuela and President of Petróleos de Venezuela (PDVSA) from 2017 to 2020. Between 2015 and 2017 he served as Minister of Housing and Habitat.

== Sanctions ==
On February 15, 2019, the Office of Foreign Assets Control (OFAC) of the United States Department of the Treasury announced that Manuel Quevedo, along with four other officials of the Government of Nicolás Maduro, was included in the list of those sanctioned by the North American body. On April 15, 2019, Quevedo was sanctioned by the Canadian government, along with 42 other officials from the government of Nicolás Maduro. According to statements by Canadian Foreign Minister Chrystia Freeland, the officials are being sanctioned because "they are directly involved in activities that undermine democratic institutions."
