= Andreína Tarazón =

Venezuelan politician

Minister for Women and Gender Equality
- In office 21 April 2013 – 28 April 2015
- President: Nicolás Maduro
- Preceded by: Nancy Pérez
- Succeeded by: Gladys Requena

Deputy of the National Assembly

Personal details
- Born: 8 February 1988; Maracay, Aragua, Venezuela
- Political party: United Socialist Party of Venezuela (PSUV)

Andreína Tarazón Bolívar (born 8 February 1988) is a Venezuelan politician that has served as deputy of the National Assembly and minister for Women and Gender Equality.

== Career ==
She graduated as a lawyer from the Central University of Venezuela, and started her political career taking part in the support team of Misión Robinson in Aragua in 2003 and in the colectivo Pueblo Soberano de la Placera between 2002 and 2003. While being a law student she was a member of the University Transformation Movement and took part in the student committee that supported the government in the National Assembly in 2007, as well as a juvenile delegate in the foundational congress of the United Socialist Party of Venezuela (PSUV) Youth. She was elected as the candidate of the PSUV in the 2010 parliamentary elections, was named the vice minister of Youth and on 21 April 2013 was named as Minister for Women and Gender Equality for the government of Nicolás Maduro. Since 27 January 2014, she has served as National Superintendent for the Defense of the Socioeconomic Rights.
