= Fidel Barbarito =

Venezuelan politician

Fidel Barbarito is a Venezuelan musician and politician. He was Minister of Culture of Venezuela. He currently works as a research and teaching coordinator at the Venezuelan School of Planning. He teaches at the National Experimental University of the Arts, where he coordinates the Free Chair for Popular Cultures.
