= Reinaldo Iturriza =

Venezuelan politician

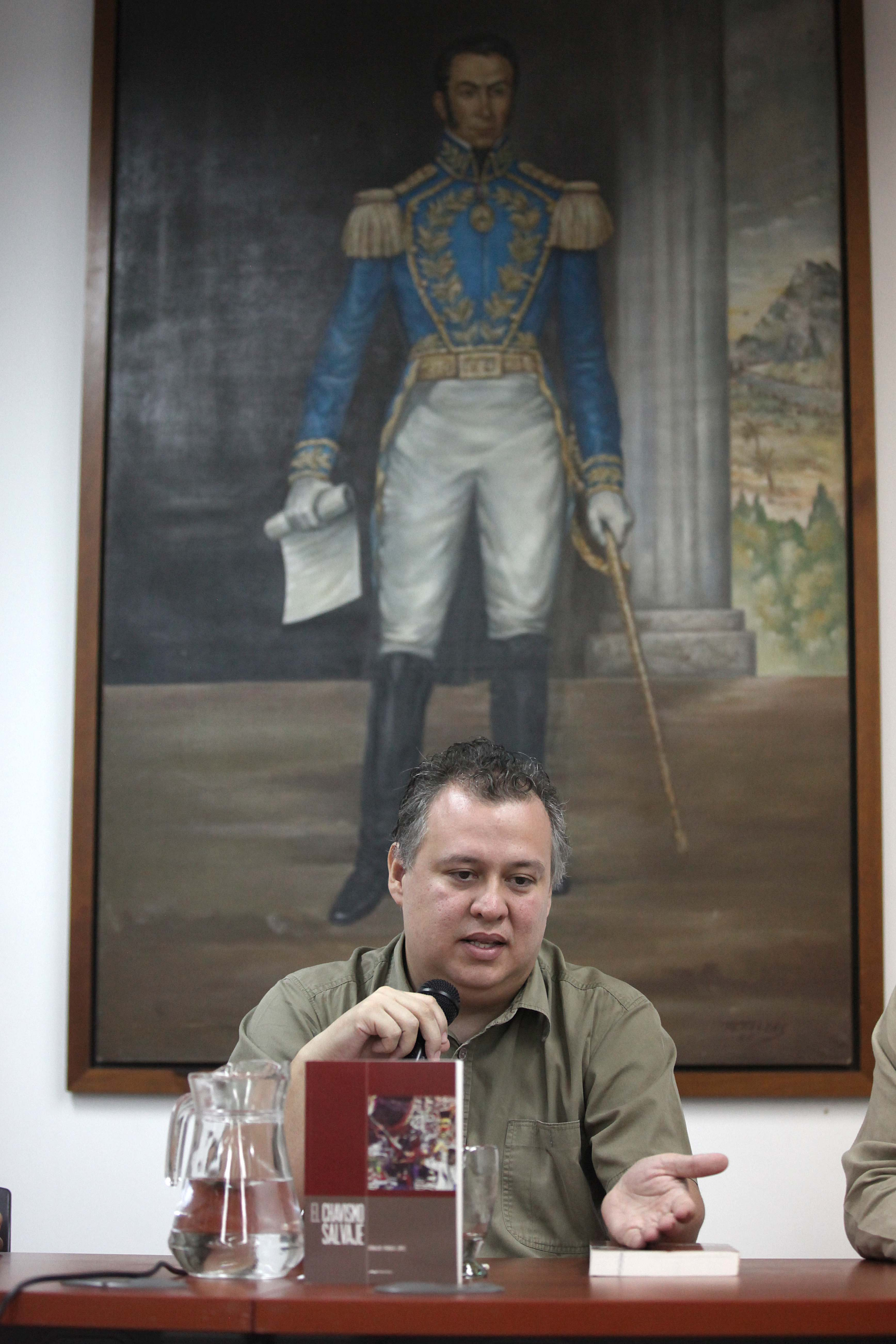
Reinaldo Iturriza

Reinaldo Antonio Iturriza López (born November 30, 1973, in Bolívar, Venezuela) is a Venezuelan politician, sociologist and writer. He was the Minister of Culture of Venezuela. He was appointed minister in September 2014 and served until January 2016.

== Biography ==
He graduated from the Central University of Venezuela, as a sociologist. He was a professor at the Bolivarian University of Venezuela.

He was also a one time Minister of Communes and Social Movements. He served between April 21, 2013, to September 2, 2014. He was replaced by Elías Jaua in 2014.

On September 3, 2014, he assumed office as the Venezuelan Minister of Culture under President Nicolás Maduro, until January 2016. He was replaced by Freddy Ñáñez.
