= Ricardo Menéndez (politician) =

Ricardo José Menéndez Prieto (7 December 1969, Caracas, Venezuela) is a Venezuelan geographer, professor and politician. He currently serves as the vice president of the Council of Ministers of Planning and Minister of the Popular Power for Planning of the Venezuelan government.

== Career ==
He is a professor at the Central University of Venezuela. He has a Master's in Urban Planning and a PhD in Urban Planning respectively. In 2009, President Hugo Chávez elected Menéndez as Minister of Popular Power for Science, Technology and Intermediate Industries, subsequently he was appointed the Vice-president of Productive Economics. On January 19, 2010, he was appointed Chairman of the Bolivarian Agency for Space Activities. On November 26, 2011, the President of Venezuela, Hugo Chávez, created the Ministry of People's Power of Industries by means of a national decree and appointed Ricardo Menéndez as minister a day before.

On April 21, 2013, he was reaffirmed on a national network as Minister of Industries of the Bolivarian Government of Venezuela for the government of Nicolás Maduro. A few months later he was reassigned to Minister of Education on 9 January 2014. On June 17, 2014, President Nicolás Maduro appointed him as Minister in charge of the Ministry of Popular Power for Planning.

On June 19, 2014, through Decree No. 1,059, President Nicolás Maduro appointed him as External Director of the Board of Directors of the State Company Petróleos de Venezuela,(PDVSA).
