= Ministry of Interior, Justice and Peace (Venezuela) =

Government ministry of Venezuela

Ministry of the People's Power for Domestic Affairs, Justice and Peace
- Ministerio del Poder Popular para Relaciones Interiores, Justicia y Paz
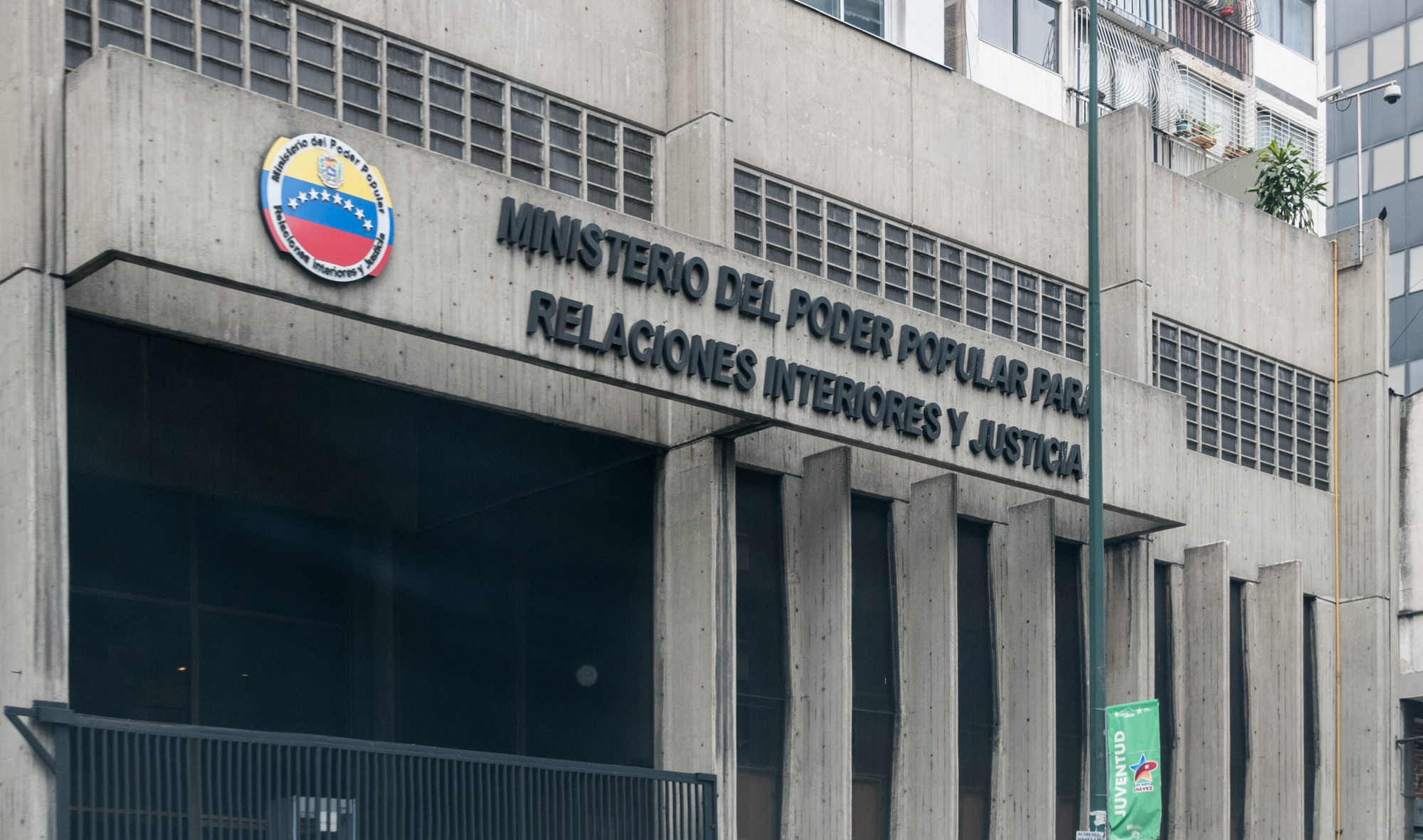
- Headquarters of the Ministry of Popular Power for Interior, Justice and Peace

Agency overview
- Formed: 1832
- Jurisdiction: Government of Venezuela
- Headquarters: Caracas, Venezuela
- Agency executive: Minister of Popular Power for Interior, Justice and Peace
- Child agencies: Bolivarian National Police; Bolivarian Intelligence Service
- Website: www.mpprij.gob.ve

The Ministry of the Popular Power for Interior, Justice and Peace (Ministerio del Poder Popular para Relaciones Interiores, Justicia y Paz) is one of 39 agencies that make up the executive office of the Venezuelan government. This ministry is also called the Ministry of Popular Power for Interior Relations and Justice and Ministry of Interior and Justice.

The ministry is a dependent entity directly under the President of Venezuela.

== History ==
Minister Jesse Chacon said in 2004 that the Ministry of Justice would then be called the Ministry of Interior and Security Policy. In 2013, President Nicolas Maduro announced that the ministry took the name of Ministry of Interior, Justice and Peace.

=== Ministers of Interior and Justice of Venezuela ===
The current Minister of Interior and Justice of Venezuela is Diosdado Cabello.

== Structure ==
- Deputy Minister of Internal Security Policy and Law
- Vice Minister of Prevention and Public Safety
- Deputy Minister of the Integrated Police
- Vice Minister of Integrated System of Criminal Investigation
- Deputy Minister for Risk Management and Civil Protection

=== Organs and affiliated organizations ===
- Autonomous Service Registries and Notaries
- Bolivarian National Intelligence Service
- Policía Nacional Bolivariana
- Scientific, Penal and Criminal Investigation Service Corps
- National Anti-Drug Office
- National Identification, Migration and Immigration Administration
- Grand Lifetime Mission Venezuela
- Mission Identity
- Venezuelan Observatory on Citizen Security
- Services Corporation Surveillance and Security
- National Institute for Land Transportation
- National Commission of Casinos
- National Directorate for Civil Protection and Firefighting

== See also ==
- Corruption in Venezuela
- Crime in Venezuela
- SEBIN
