= Jorge Elieser Márquez =

Venezuelan politician

Jorge Elieser Marquez (born February 20, 1971, in Caracas, Venezuela) is a Venezuelan politician. He is the minister in charge of Office of the Presidency and Monitoring of Government Management of Venezuela. He was appointed minister on 3 November 2017 by President Nicolas Maduro.

== Early life and career ==
Marquez graduated from the National Guard Officer Training School (Efofac) in 1994. He was a brigadier general of the Bolivarian National Guard (GNB). He also serves as general director of the National Commission of Telecommunications and was appointed on August 7, 2017. During his tenure as the general director, he closed two Colombian television channels in Venezuela, due to their coverage of alleged misconduct of former Venezuelan attorney general Luisa Ortega Díaz. According to a profile published on the official page of Venezolana de Televisión on November 3, 2017: "He was aide-de-camp to President Nicolás Maduro, with whom he has worked since he was Foreign Minister of the Bolivarian Republic of Venezuela."

He has also been president of the Socialist Telecommunications Corporation, appointed on 23 May 2019. On 22 May 2020, he is appointed by the Supreme Tribunal of Justice (Venezuela) through a controversial measure as president of the Ad hoc board of the DirecTV Venezuela company, after the withdrawal of the US company from the country.

== Controversy ==
On November 9, 2017, the United States Department of the Treasury included him in a list of Venezuelan officials sanctioned for allegedly being involved in "electoral fraud, censorship of the media and corruption in food distribution programs". The United States Department of the Treasury as a result of the allegations froze all the assets owned by Marquez in the United States, he was also permanently banned from entering the US.

On March 30, 2018, he was sanctioned by the Government of Panama for being considered high risk for money laundering, terrorist financing and financing of the proliferation of weapons of mass destruction. On April 15, 2019, Márquez Monsalve was sanctioned by the Government of Canada, along with 42 other officials from the government of Nicolás Maduro. According to statements by Canadian Foreign Minister Chrystia Freeland, the officials are being sanctioned because "they are directly involved in activities that undermine democratic institutions."

In 2021, he was made subject to EU's personal sanctions making him ineligible for entry to the EU countries and unable to conduct any financial operations in these jurisdictions. He was deemed to be a close associate of Nicolas Maduro and thus a complicit contributor to the progressively deteriorating situation with human rights and democracy in Venezuela, particularly by suppressing free speech and limiting access to independent and critical television and radio stations, news agencies and websites.
