= Diego Alfredo Molero Bellavia =

Venezuelan politician

Minister of Defense
- In office 29 October 2012 – 5 July 2013
- President: Hugo Chavez
- Preceded by: Henry Rangel Silva
- Succeeded by: Carmen Meléndez

Personal details
- Born: 12 January 1960 (age 66) Coro, Venezuela
- Party: United Socialist Party of Venezuela
- Education: Military Academy of the Bolivarian Navy

Military service
- Branch/service: Venezuela Armed Forces
- Rank: Admiral
- Unit: Venezuelan Navy

Diego Alfredo Molero Bellavia is a Venezuelan public official who served as Venezuela's Minister of Defense.

== Ambassador ==
On July 5, 2013, President Nicolás Maduro named him as Venezuela's Ambassador to Brazil but was appointed as Venezuela's Ambassador to Peru in October 2014.

He was expelled on August 11, 2017 by the government of Peru following congressional recommendation. Through a statement, the Ministry of Foreign Affairs said that its decision responds to "the breakdown of democratic order in Venezuela." The authorities gave Molero Bellavia five days to leave the country.

The political situation in Venezuela has generated a diplomatic confrontation between the governments in recent months, which has worsened after the establishment of the National Constituent Assembly in August 2017.

== Sanctions ==
Diego Alfredo Molero Bellavia is banned from entering Colombia. The Colombian government maintains a list of people banned from entering Colombia or subject to expulsion; as of January 2019, the list had 200 people with a "close relationship and support for the Nicolás Maduro regime".
