= Nicolás Maduro 2018 presidential campaign =

Nicolas Maduro presidential campaign, 2018
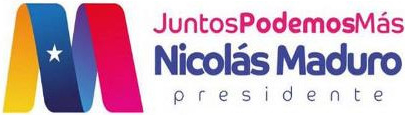
- Campaign: 2018 Venezuelan presidential election
- Candidate: Nicolás Maduro; Incumbent President of Venezuela (2013–2026); Vice President of Venezuela (2012–13); Minister of Foreign Affairs (2006–13); President of the National Assembly of Venezuela (2005–06); Constituent Assembly member (1999)
- Affiliation: United Socialist Party of Venezuela; Coalition partner: Great Patriotic Pole (GPP)
- Status: Announced: 2 February 2018; Official nominee: 4 February 2018; Won the election: 20 May 2018
- Key people: Jorge Rodríguez (Campaign chief)
- Slogan(s): Juntos Podemos Más ("Together we can do more"); Juntos todos es posible ("Together everything is possible"); Vamos Venezuela ("Forward Venezuela")
- Chant: Todos con Maduro ("All with Maduro")

Nicolás Maduro, incumbent President of Venezuela since 2013 and successor of Hugo Chávez, was officially nominated for re-election as the presidential candidate of the Great Patriotic Pole (GPP) on 4 February 2018.

Due to the perceived unpopularity of President Nicolás Maduro within the PSUV, it was speculated that potential candidates would include former National Assembly President Diosdado Cabello, Vice President Tareck El Aissami, and National Constituent Assembly President Delcy Rodríguez. However, Maduro was eventually chosen to run as the party's presidential candidate on 2 February 2018.

During his campaign, Maduro has denied that there is a humanitarian crisis in Venezuela and says that Venezuelans dying from poor health is "exaggerated", blaming many shortcomings on the United States. Maduro made the campaign promise of creating a "new economy" in Venezuela.

The Bolivarian government also increased spending on populist policies during the campaign to help sway voters to support Maduro. Analysts suggested that those policies would further exacerbate the negative effects of the crisis in Venezuela.

== Campaign ==
The campaign for the presidential elections and the legislative councils started on 22 April and ended on 17 May midnight (VST).

=== April ===
In late April, Maduro visited the state of Bolivar and stated that this "is a new beginning to get 10 million votes" and that "love will overcome May 20 over the lies, of manipulation and economic warfare".

On 24 April, during a campaign event in Carabobo state, Nicolás Maduro declared that during the electoral campaign, the government would call on all Venezuelans with the Carnet de la Patria to look after votes, assured that the closer they get to 10 million votes, "the more guarantee of peace, of stability" and of "economic recovery" there would be. Maduro called Henri Falcón "Faltrump" due to his dollarization proposal and labeled Javier Bertucci as "Little Soup Bertucci", referring to his charity activities of delivering soup to impoverished Venezuelans.

=== May ===
On 1 May, in Cojedes state, Maduro threatened taking action against supermarkets and food centers nationwide if they increased the prices of products in the following days, declaring that after the 20 May election "I'll be president anyway...by hook or by crook."

On 2 May, Maduro warned in a campaign rally in Vargas state that if a "capitalist government" that handed over the country's resources were to be installed, he would take up arms himself to defend the revolution, stating "I would take a rifle to start the armed revolution. These people will never stand for a sellout and capitalist government, that is why we have to prepare ourselves to defend in peace the sovereignty and democracy of Venezuela",

On 11 May President Maduro said, during a campaign rally in Trujillo state, "North American imperialism, go fuck yourself with your orders because here in Venezuela the sovereign people rules". He also described Colombia's ongoing President Juan Manuel Santos as a "lackey" of Washington.

Before a campaign rally in Charallave on 15 May 2018, President Maduro's group handed out free mangoes to supporters suffering from hunger who had arrived at the event.

On 16 May President Maduro said that he foresaw a "great victory" and accused the US and France of trying to "put pressure on the country" to overthrow his government, saying "The Ku Klux Klan of Washington is pursuing us". Maduro also blamed Venezuela's economic difficulties on "the economic forces of the United States" and the "oligarchy that did not conform when it lost political power".

On 17 May the campaign closure rally of Nicolás Maduro took place on Bolívar Avenue in Caracas. During his speech of the campaign closure, Maduro expressed that Bolívar Avenue was "overwhelmed", but Winston Vallenilla once asked the assistants to come closer to fill the empty spaces and publications on social networks of deputy Luis Florido and other persons refuted the claim. Argentine former football player Diego Maradona participated and danced in the rally. The same day Bertucci condemned the international sanctions against Venezuela saying, "How can they ask for sanctions against the country. Oh, it is easy. They are abroad eating well, sleeping well, living in luxurious homes. Asking for the United States government to tighten sanctions, and to tighten the noose on the Venezuelan people. I think that is irresponsible. That's not what we need." A Venezuelan in Rome published a video explaining that he found a large painting on a wall promoting the vote for Maduro and complaining that the country's money is wasted on placing said messages abroad.

On 18 May, Maduro stated "Venezuela has become the focus and the elections in a world election ... I will accept the results, whatever they are". He said that his opponent Henri Falcón was the International Monetary Fund's candidate. Maduro affirmed not to care about the position of the countries that declared that they will dismiss the presidential elections, saying "What fuck do I give that Europe does not recognize me, that Washington does not recognize me. I care about what the Venezuelan people say".

== Homeland Plan 2019-2025 ==
The manifesto called "Homeland Plan 2019-2025" (Spanish: Plan de la Patria 2019-2025) was launched by President Nicolas Maduro on 23 April 2018. It was also approved by the National Constituent Assembly (ANC), months after his re-election.

According to the Venezuelan government propaganda outlet Telesur the plan includes:

- Improving both education and public healthcare sectors.
- Building five million new homes across the country.
- Revolutionizing the Venezuelan economy.
- Achieve the goals of the United Nations Sustainable Development Goals 2030 Agenda.

== Election result ==
Following the poll closures at 6:00pm VST, it was reported by a CNE source that voter turnout was only 32.3%, the lowest turnout in Venezuela's modern democratic history since the 1958 coup d'état. CNE data would later show that turnout was 46.1%, a record low.

Presidential candidate rivals Henri Falcón and Javier Bertucci rejected the results, stating that there were too many irregularities.

Candidate	Party	Votes	%
Nicolás Maduro	United Socialist Party of Venezuela	6,244,016	67.84
Henri Falcón	Progressive Advance	1,927,174	20.93
Javier Bertucci	Independent	983,140	10.82
Reinaldo Quijada	Popular Political Unit 89	36,132	0.39
Invalid/blank votes		177,474	–
Total		9,381,218	100
Registered voters/turnout		20,527,571	46.07
Source: National Electoral Commission

== Party representation ==
Great Patriotic Pole (GPP)
United Socialist Party of Venezuela (PSUV)
Movement We Are Venezuela (MSV)
For Social Democracy (PODEMOS)
Fatherland for All (PPT)
Communist Party of Venezuela (PCV)
Venezuelan Popular Unity (UPV)
Authentic Renewal Organization (ORA)
Tupamaro (MRT)
People's Electoral Movement (MEP)
Alliance for Change (APC)

== Aftermath ==
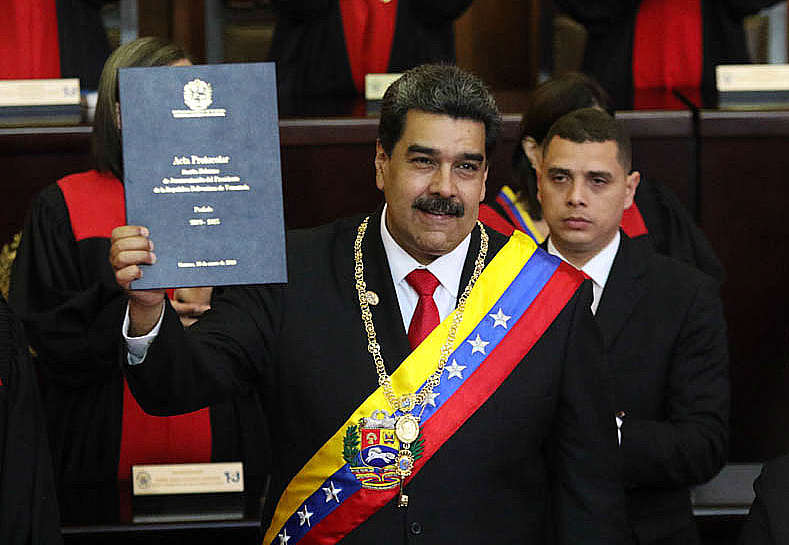
Maduro at his second inauguration on 10 January 2019, 8 months after elections were held

Tibisay Lucena stated that the CNE forbade the payment to voters offered by Maduro. On 22 May when the CNE proclaimed Maduro as president, Maduro announced the creation of a presidential commission for economic advice. The same day, Maduro declared as personae non gratae American diplomats Todd D. Robinson and Brian Naranjo, who had to leave the country within 48 hours.

On 24 May, Maduro took oath among the Constituent Assembly, a ceremony that should have taken place in January 2018 with the opposition-led National Assembly in accordance with Article 231 of the Venezuelan constitution. The National Assembly rejected the election's results, calling them an "electoral farce" and declared that Maduro must be considered "a usurper".

Maduro's new six-year term did not begin until 10 January 2019, when he took his official oath at a public ceremony in Caracas in front of the Venezuelan Supreme Court. The ceremony was attended by spectators such as Nicaraguan President Daniel Ortega and president of Bolivia Evo Morales.

The elections were widely disputed both within Venezuela and in the broader international community. In January 2019, the National Assembly declared the results of the election invalid, and invoked clauses of the 1999 Venezuelan Constitution to install National Assembly Speaker Juan Guaidó as acting president, precipitating the 2019 Venezuelan presidential crisis. Maduro's supporters refused to acknowledge the move, and Guaidó was placed under arrest for a short time (the details of which are under dispute). Several international organizations and independent countries have lined up to support either side of the conflict, and the former Supreme Tribunal of Justice of Venezuela, in exile in Panama since 2017, has given its support to the legitimacy of the National Assembly's moves.

== Recognition of Maduro's re-election ==
Nations recognizing presidential power during the Venezuelan presidential crisis Venezuela Neutral No statement Recognize Guaidó Support National Assembly Recognize Maduro
