= Quijada (surname) =

Quijada is a surname. Notable people with the surname include:

- Alfonso Quijada Urías (born 1940), Salvadoran poet and author
- Brian Quijada, Salvadoran-American actor, playwright, musician and a solo performer
- Felipe Flores Quijada (born 1977), Chilean footballer
- John Quijada (born 1959), American linguist, creator of Ithkuil
- Jonathan Quijada (born 1995), Venezuelan volleyball player
- José Quijada (born 1995), Venezuelan baseball player
- José Bernardino Quijada (1848-?), Chilean educator
- Reinaldo Quijada (born 1959), Venezuelan engineer and politician
- Rubert Quijada (born 1989), Venezuelan footballer.
