= Revolutionary Middle Class =

Political party in Venezuela

Revolutionary Middle Class Clase Media Revolucionaria
- Leader: Reinaldo Quijada
- Founded: August 7, 2006
- Dissolved: 2008
- Ideology: Chavismo
- Political position: Left-wing

Revolutionary Middle Class (Spanish: Clase Media Revolucionaria) was a left-wing political party in Venezuela. It was founded on August 7, 2006, as the electoral arm of the Positive Middle Class movement. It supports President Hugo Chávez. In the first election it participated in the party obtained 68,283 votes (0.59%).

The Secretary-General of Revolutionary Middle Class was Reinaldo Quijada.
