= José Quijada =

José Quijada may refer to:

- José Quijada (baseball) (born 1995), Venezuelan baseball player
- José Bernardino Quijada (born 1848, death date unknown), Chilean educator
