= Vote buying =

Illegal campaign method

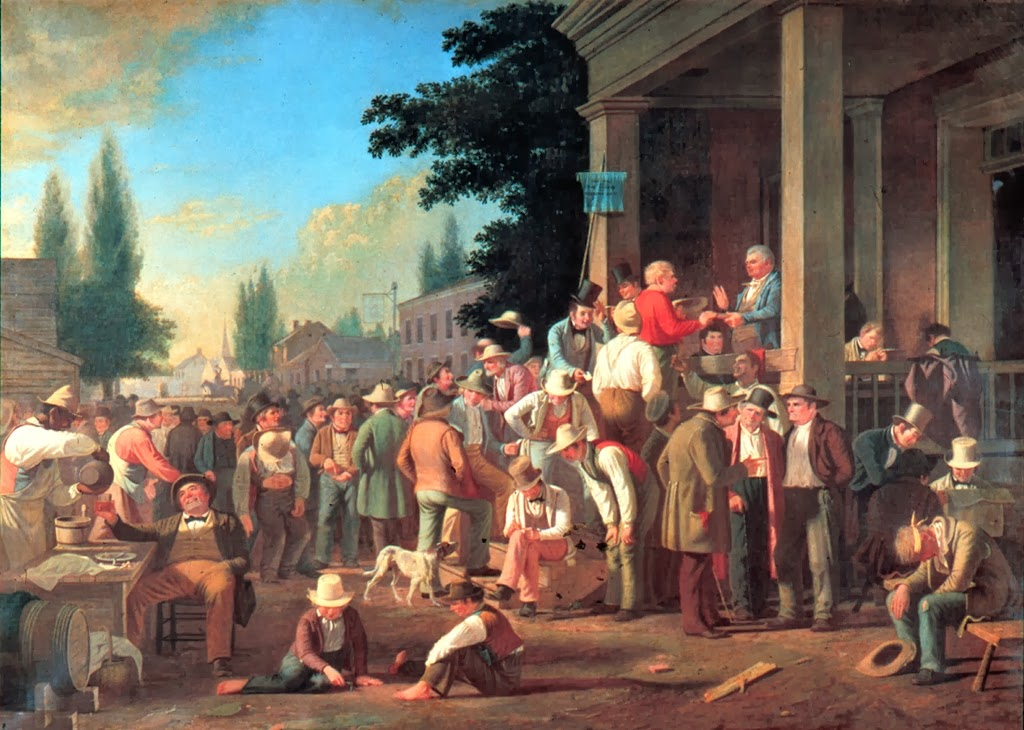
George Bingam's "The County Election" (1852) shows the effects of the campaigns' "treating" the voters with alcoholic beverages: several of them are too drunk to stand without assistance.

Vote buying, also referred to as voter bribery, electoral clientelism and patronage politics, occurs when a political party or candidate distributes money or resources to a voter in an upcoming election with the expectation that the voter votes for the actor handing out monetary rewards. Vote buying can take various forms such as a monetary exchange, as well as an exchange for necessary goods or services. This practice is often used to incentivise or persuade voters to turn out to elections and vote in a particular way. Although this practice is illegal in many countries such as the United States, Argentina, Mexico, Kenya, Brazil and Nigeria, its prevalence remains worldwide.

In some parts of the United States in the mid- and late 19th century, members of competing parties would vie, sometimes openly and other times with much greater secrecy, to buy and sell votes. Voters would be compensated with cash or the covering of one's house/tax payment. To keep the practice of vote buying secret, parties would open fully staffed vote-buying shops. Parties would also hire runners, who would go out into the public and find floating voters and bargain with them to vote for their side.

In England, documentation and stories of vote buying and vote selling are also well known. The most famous episodes of vote buying came in 18th century England when two or more rich aristocrats spent whatever money it took to win. The "Spendthrift election" came in Northamptonshire in 1768, when three earls each spent over £100,000 on their favoured candidates.

Voters may be given money or other rewards for voting in a particular way, or not voting. In some jurisdictions, the offer or giving of other rewards is referred to as "electoral treating". Electoral treating remains legal in some jurisdictions, such as in the Seneca Nation of Indians.

== Targets of vote buying ==
One of the main concerns with vote buying lies in the question of which population or group of voters are most likely to be susceptible to accepting compensation in exchange for their vote. Scholars such as Stokes argue that weakly opposed voters are the best ones to target for vote buying. Targeting these voters increases the buyer's vote count, but also deprives the opposition of votes they otherwise would have received. Because neutral voters might vote either way, buying from neutral voters is less effective.

Other scholars argue that it is people of lower income status who are the best group to target, as they are the most likely to be receptive to monetary or other forms of compensation. Since the poor may not have enough money to purchase basic items, it would generally take only a small payment to buy their votes. The wealthy, who have sufficient means to address significant problems in their lives, would be less willing to sell a vote unless a higher price was offered for it. Evidence from both Argentina and Nigeria support this view.

== Vote monitoring ==
When postal ballots are mailed to voters, the buyer can fill them out or see how they are filled out. Monitoring is harder when ballots are cast secretly at a polling place. In some cases, there have been instances of voter tickets, or monitoring by individuals. Voters seeking to be compensated for their votes would use specially-provided voter ballots, or would fold their ballot in a particular way in order to indicate that they voted for the candidate they were paid to vote for.

Another strategy has been to invoke personalized social norms to make voters honor their contracts at the voting booth. Such social norms could include personal obligation such as moral debts, social obligations to the buyers, or a threat of withholding or ceasing to produce necessary resources. This is made more effective when the rewards are delivered personally by the candidate or someone close to them, in order to create a sense of gratitude on behalf of the voters towards the candidate.

=== Chain voting ===
If a buyer is able to obtain a blank ballot (by theft, counterfeit, or a legitimate absentee ballot) the buyer can then mark the ballot for their chosen candidates and pay a voter to take the pre-marked ballot to a polling station, exchange it for the blank ballot issued and return the blank ballot to the attacker. This is known as chain voting. It can be controlled in polling places by issuing each ballot with a unique number, which is checked and torn off as the ballot is placed in the ballot box.

== Consequences ==
Scholars have linked several negative consequences to the practice of vote buying. The presence of vote buying in democratic states poses a threat to democracy itself, as it interferes with the ability to rely on a popular vote as a measure of people's support for potential governments' policies. However, according to political scientist Eric Kramon, vote buying is not necessarily detrimental to the quality of democracy; rather, the relationship between vote buying and the quality of democracy is far more nuanced.

Another noted consequence is that the autonomy of voters is undermined. Since getting paid or receiving rewards for their votes generates a form of income that they may need to support themselves or their families, they have no autonomy to cast the vote that they truly want. This is extremely problematic because if it is the most corrupt politicians who are engaging in vote buying, then it is their interests that remain the ones that dictate how the country is going to be run. This, in turn, perpetuates corruption in the system even further creating a cycle.

Thirdly, vote buying can create a dependency of voters on the income or goods that they are receiving for their votes, and can further perpetuate a type of poverty trap. If they are receiving medicine from their communities' broker for example, if this tie is cut off then they may no longer have access to this necessity. It can be true that the broker in that community has no interest or incentive to actually increase the standards of living of the community members, as it is very possible that they are only interested in getting whatever share of the profit they are entitled to for working for the party. Additionally, if the goods or money are coming directly from a candidate, this candidate's only wish is to maintain their power. That being said, they may provide services but their real interest may lie in keeping the voters dependent on the rewards they are providing in order to stay in power.

== Prevalence ==
=== Europe ===
==== Hungary ====
Some vote buying without vote monitoring has been reported.

==== Moldova ====
400 Moldovan citizens were investigated for allegedly receiving money to vote for a determined candidate in the first round of the 2024 Moldovan presidential election and to choose the "no" option in the 2024 Moldovan European Union membership constitutional referendum. Those found guilty would have been fined 37,000 Moldovan lei (over 1,900 euros at the time), but they were given the option of getting away with it if they cooperated with the authorities.

=== Latin America ===
The 2010 and 2012 surveys for the Americas Barometer showed that 15% of surveyed voters in Latin America had been offered something of value in exchange for voting a particular way.

==== Argentina ====
Vote buying and the overall practice of clientelism is widespread in Argentina. According to Simeon Nichter, one of the main perpetrators of these illegal activities were the Peronist party. The relationship between voters and Peronist candidates allegedly are such that voters are offered particular goods, services, favours or monetary compensation in exchange for their political support for the party. These rewards could include a job, medicine, a roof, clothing, foods, and other goods or services. The case of Argentina in particular in that it relies heavily on face-to-face and day-to-day interactions between "brokers" who act as middlemen and voters. Since many of the communities in Argentina are ridden with poverty and are in need of these particular resources, it is these communities that have statistically shown to be in a certain demographic that were targeted for voted buying. Additionally, vote buying in this region focuses on citizens who are not strongly in favour or opposed to the political machine, and whose political loyalty does not necessarily lie with one party or another. In this way, vote buying acts as a mechanism to sway the decisions of weakly opposed voters.

In a study done by Susan C. Stokes, she finds that the brokers in these communities are known to all the citizens and have access to the necessary resources from the municipality. They maintain relationships with the voters and grant them rewards and favours continuously in order to keep the party they work for in the office. This is one main explanation for why many lower-income voters are seen voting for populist leaders, as well as authoritarian ones. Many citizens view these brokers as positive pillars in their lives and have the utmost respect for the help they distribute. However, others view them as hands of corruption. Stokes further explains that the capacity of these brokers is constrained due to the fact that they can only maintain this type of transactional relationship with a limited number of voters. Furthermore, the brokers have the additional responsibility of maintaining trusting and solid relationships with their resource suppliers. Without these strong ties, they would have no means through which to carry out vote-buying practices.

==== Mexico ====
Similarly to Argentina, it has been found that vote-buying in Mexico is most likely in rural and poor regions of the country. There are many instances of vote buying that have occurred in the history of Mexican elections, however, there are two main instances of fund in the literature that occurred in the last two decades. The first was the 2006 Mexican election, where it was found that 8.8% of the population that was not a beneficiary of a specific social program was offered compensation for their vote. Similarly, a corruption inquiry arrested Andrés Granier Melo for embezzlement of funds in the state of Tabasco during his governorship: among other things, some of these funds were used for vote-buying (although Melo has denied all accusations).

==== Venezuela ====
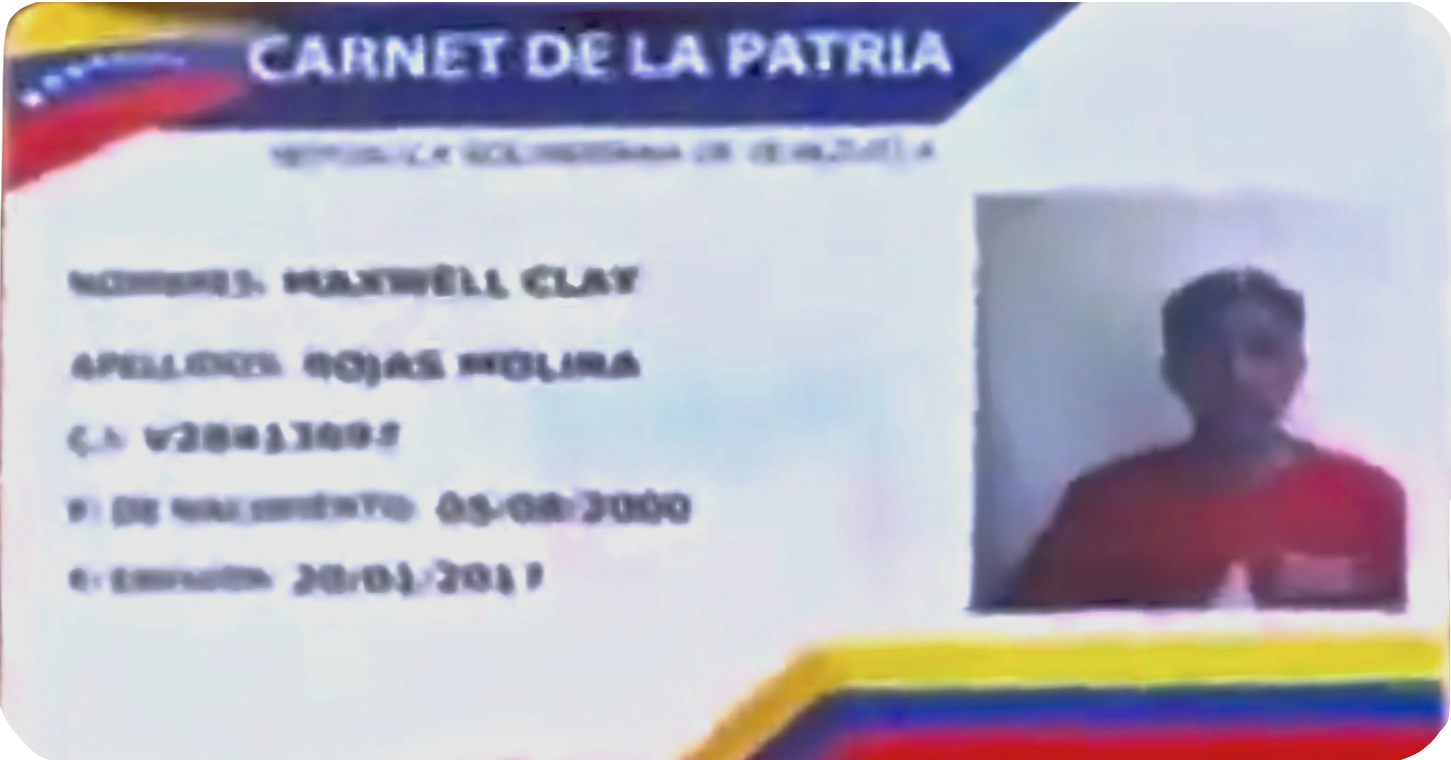
Carnet de la Patria, a digital ID based on China's Social Credit System. The card allows the government to monitor citizen behavior such as social media presence, political party membership, and whether or not they voted.

During the 2018 Venezuelan presidential election, reports of vote buying were prevalent during the presidential campaigning. Venezuelans suffering from hunger were pressured to vote for Maduro, with the government bribing potential supporters with food. Maduro promised rewards for citizens who scanned their Carnet de la Patria at the voting booth, which would allow the government to monitor the political party of their citizens and whether or not they had voted. These prizes were reportedly never delivered.

Everyone who has a Carnet de la Patria has to go to vote on 20 May. ... I am thinking of giving a prize to the people of Venezuela who go out to vote that day with the Carnet de la Patria

— President Nicolás Maduro, 28 April 2018

In a visit to Delta Amacuro, president and reelection candidate Nicolás Maduro gave away eight motor boats, nine ambulances, and reopened the "Antonio Díaz" Tucupita Airport, among other announcements, violating Article 223 of the Organic Law of Electoral Processes which forbids the use of state resources during election campaigns, as well as one of the prerogatives in the Agreement of Electoral Guarantees signed by the presidential candidates to the CNE. On 8 May Maduro again violated the electoral law during an electoral act in the Amazonas state by promising to give fuel to the entity in exchange for votes.

=== Africa ===
The fifth Afrobarometer survey showed that 48% of voters in 33 African countries feared violence during elections, and 16% of voters were offered money or other goods in exchange for voting a particular way in the most recent election.

==== Nigeria ====
On a self-reported survey that was conducted, 1 in 5 Nigerian has experienced an offer for their vote. The rewards offered by Nigerian politicians include money, commodities such as food and clothing, or a job. Although the practice of vote buying is widespread, 58% of Nigerians surveyed at the time of the 2007 election viewed vote buying as immoral. Despite this, when asked if they thought it was wrong to accept rewards or monetary compensation for your vote, 78% said no. One factor that needs to be iterated when it comes to studies that are based on surveys is that since vote buying is illegal in most countries, a researcher's ability to collect accurate data is hindered. This is because many citizens may not feel comfortable revealing their experience or involvement with corrupt activities, or fear that they will suffer repercussions from their governments for coming forward with such information.

==== Kenya ====
Since the 1990s, Kenya has had regular multiparty elections in which vote buying has played a central role. In his article, scholar Eric Kramon states: "According to the data gathered by the Coalition for Accountable Political Finance in Kenya, cash handouts to voters represents around 40% of the average parliamentary candidates' campaign budget, making up the largest budget item." These handouts are made in various ways including stops on the campaign trail, and at-large campaign rallies. In the 2022 Kenyan general election, 40% of surveyed adult Kenyans reported having accepted a bribe in exchange for their vote, and 22% for the 2007 Kenyan general election.

It is noted by Kramen that access to information is a huge factor in determining the success of vote buying in Kenya. If the voters have little access to political information or lack political knowledge then they are more likely to be swayed by clientelistic reasoning. Moreover, if the voter does have access to information about an incumbent, then the price to sway their vote is more likely to go up. Additionally, Kramon notes that citizens of Kenya tend to value candidates who provide rewards because their ability to do so points to how great their abilities will be once they are in office.

=== Asia ===
==== Indonesia ====
In Indonesian, vote buying is often known as politik uang (lit. 'money politics'). According to a survey of 440 respondents by Institut Riset Indonesia in January–March 2020 in areas that will have local elections in 2020, 60 percent of respondents said that they will allow their vote to be bought. Reasons for accepting vote buying include considering it as a gift that can not be rejected (35–46 percent), compensation for not working on the election day (25–30 percent), and supporting daily needs (9–16 percent). One of the common tactics of vote buying is serangan fajar (lit. 'dawn attack'), which is giving money a day or two before the election day. The amount ranges from Rp30,000 to Rp50,000. According to Burhanuddin Muhtadi in his book Kuasa Uang; Politik Uang dalam Pemilu Pasca-Orde Baru, vote buying in Indonesia is done by individual candidates instead of political parties because of intense intraparty competition, forcing candidates to rely on their own networks instead of relying on the party machine.

==== Philippines ====
Vote buying in the Philippines is prohibited under Section 261, Article XXII, of the Omnibus Election Code. Despite the Commission on Elections's (COMELEC) public campaign against vote buying in the Philippines, vote buying is rampant across the country especially near the election period. In 2019, police arrested people allegedly buying or selling votes, including 84 people in Makati and 17 in Muntinlupa. In Southern Luzon, there were reports of ₱50 to ₱500 being given away with the names of candidates stapled to them. Vote buying still remains to be a large element of elections in the Philippines.

=== North America ===
==== United States of America ====
In the 2025 Wisconsin elections for a seat in the Wisconsin Supreme Court, Elon Musk was accused of attempting to influence votes for Wisconsin Republican candidate Brad Schimel through vote buying. Musk's America PAC established an online petition to oppose "activist judges," promising $100 to Wisconsin residents who signed. He also handed out a $1 million USD check to a voter. In the U.S., low-cost vote-buying appears not to be a thing of the past. A 2021 study, using a nationally representative survey, by Jordan Gans-Morse and Simeon Nichter, found that a substantial share of Americans were willing to sell their votes for cash, for as little as US$25.

== See also ==
- Patronage
