= Homeland card =

Venezuelan ID

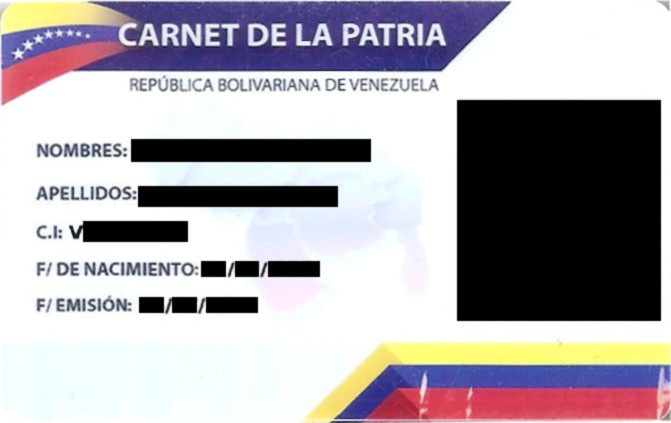
Obverse of the Homeland card

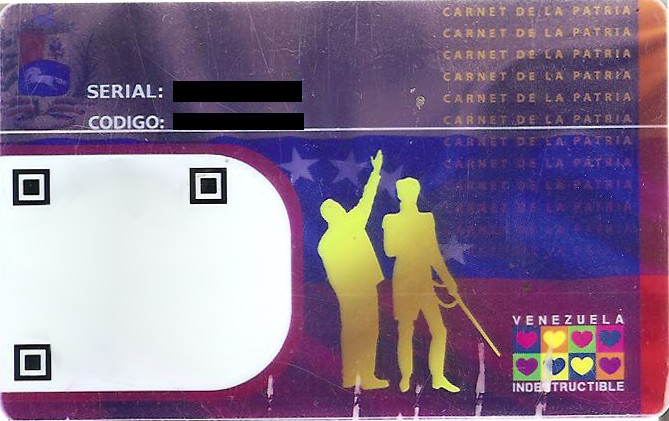
Reverse of the card, where the QR code position patterns are observed

The Homeland card (Spanish: Carnet de la patria) is a Venezuelan identity document that includes a unique personalized QR code. It was created in 2016 by the Venezuelan government with the objective of knowing the socioeconomic status of the population and streamlining the system of the Bolivarian missions and that of the local committees of supply and production (CLAP).

The document has a digital wallet that is articulated within a state electronic payment system and in which carriers can also receive different monetary bonds from the Venezuelan State.

The use of the card has been reported as a possible method of social control, a policy of social exclusion as well as coercion and vote buying during the 2017 Venezuelan regional elections, the 2017 Venezuelan municipal elections, the 2018 Venezuelan presidential election and the 2020 parliamentary election.

== Creation ==
It was created on December 18, 2016, when President Nicolás Maduro announced the creation of the Homeland card system in his weekly television program Contacto con Maduro. He also pointed out that the technological platform of the card has been materialized through agreements with China. Then, on January 20, 2017, the first day of registration to acquire the Homeland card began.

== Processing ==
In principle, the acquisition of the Homeland card is free and not mandatory. To process it requires a photo, Venezuelan identity card (Spanish: Cédula de identidad) and information about the existence of health problems, participation in electoral processes and if the person enjoys any of the social missions of the national government.

== Controversies ==
"Red points" in Caracas during the 2018 presidential elections
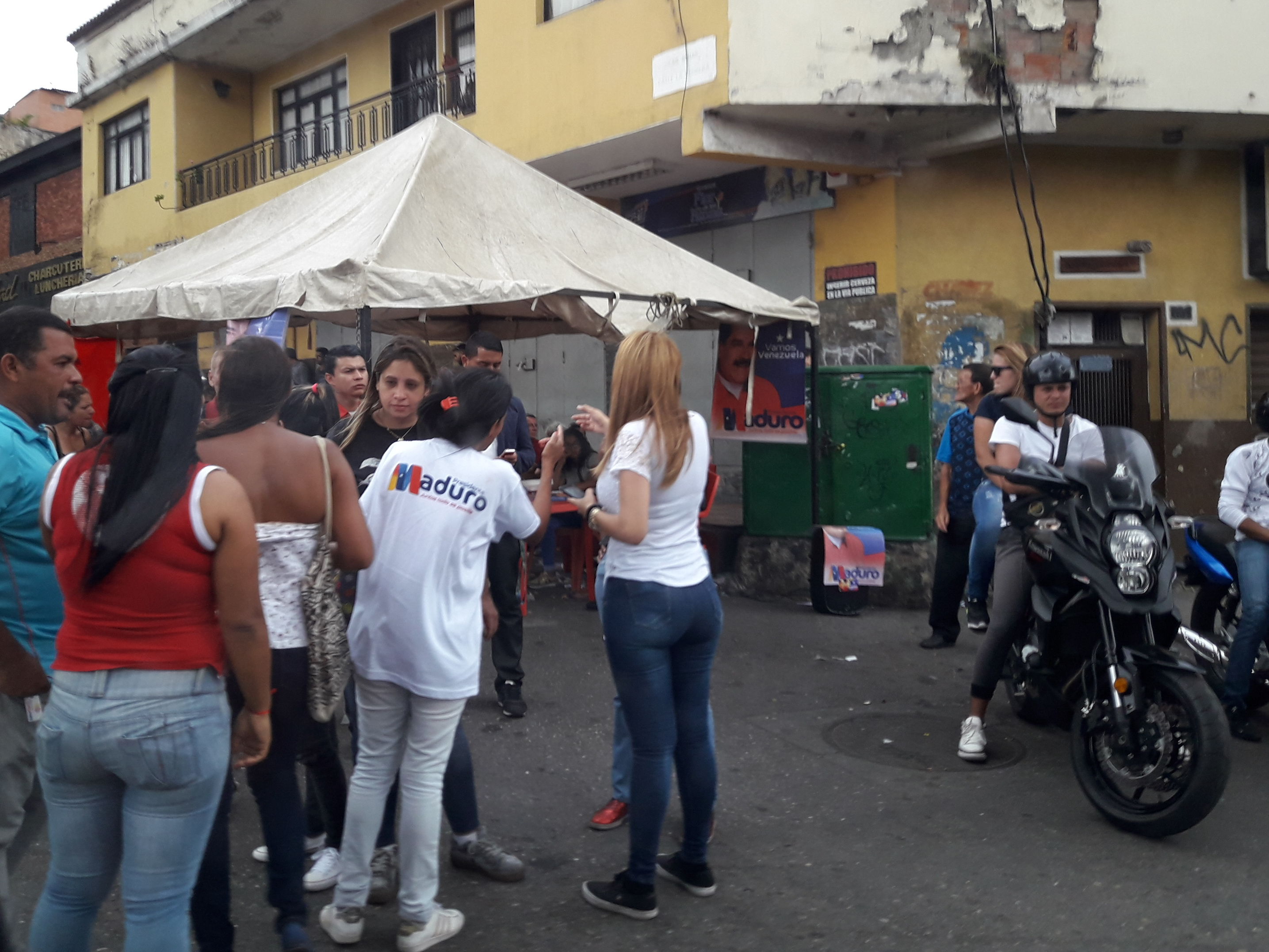
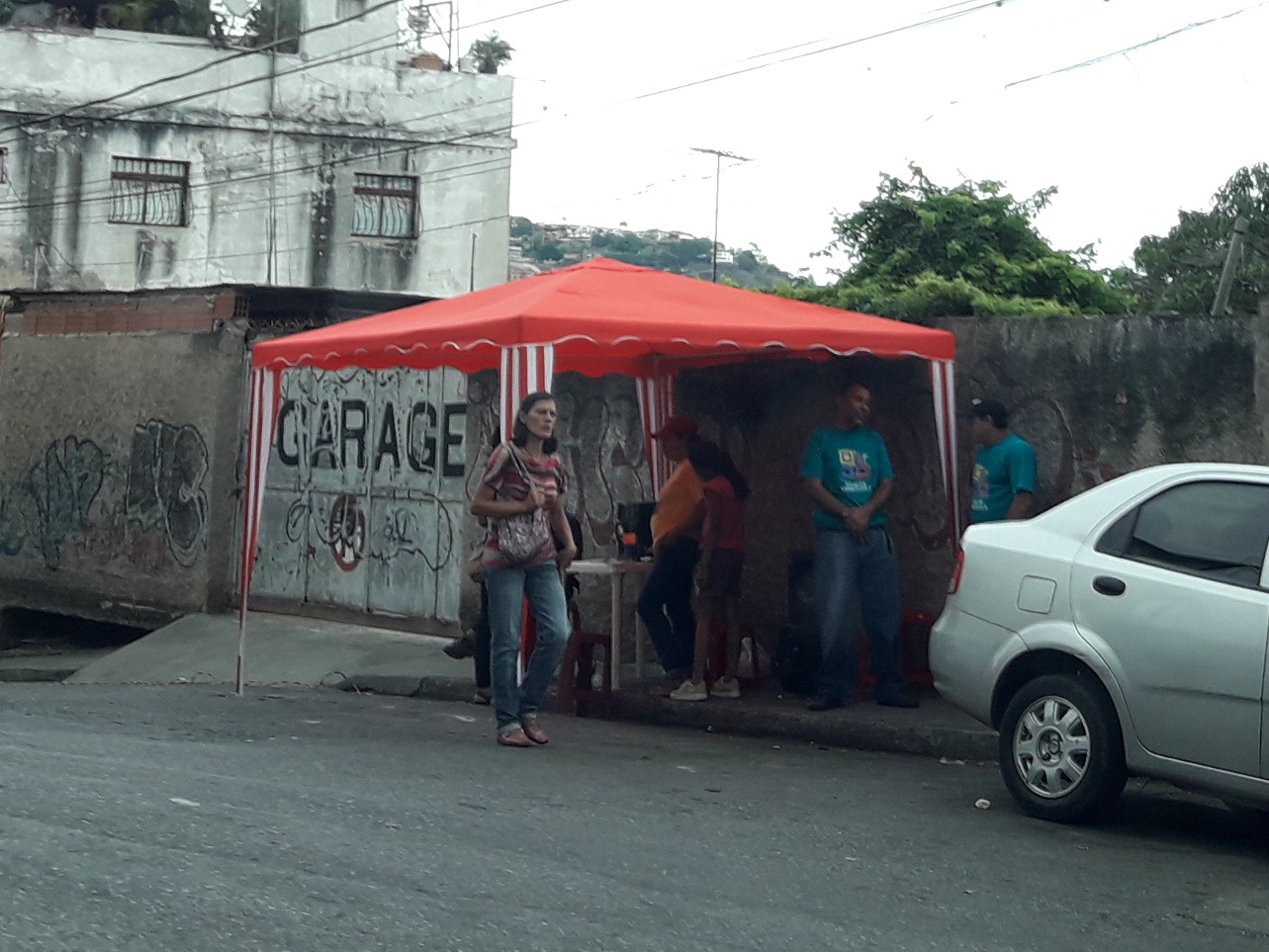

Writer Leonardo Padrón described the card as a "hunger-for-votes exchange", saying: "Give me your signature, take your CLAP [food box]." On the other hand, the organization secretary of the Alianza Bravo Pueblo party, Alcides Padilla, criticized the Homeland card, saying that "through this card, the government wants to ration food for Venezuelans." Similarly, the Communist Party of Venezuela has ensured that the card is a policy of exclusion and that all the inhabitants of the country have constitutional rights that can not be dependent on said document.

In August 2018, Venezuelan pensioners protested in front of the main offices of the Venezuelan Institute of Social Security (IVSS), complaining that the requirement of the Homeland Card to collect their pension limited their access.

In September 2018, the Secretary General of the Organization of American States, Luis Almagro, said he had received complaints from patients who had been denied chemotherapy treatment for not having the Homeland card. The Reuters news agency has also received complaints from state doctors denying insulin prescriptions to diabetic patients for not being enrolled in the Homeland card system. Benito Urrea, a 76-year-old diabetic, said a state physician recently denied him an insulin prescription and accused him of being a member of the "right" because he had not enrolled in the card system.

=== Elections ===
During the 2017 Venezuelan regional elections, the 2017 Venezuelan municipal elections and the 2018 Venezuelan presidential election, there were complaints of the use of the Homeland card as the coercion method of the voter.

Reports of vote buying were also prevalent during the presidential campaigning. Venezuelans suffering from hunger were pressured to vote for Maduro, with the government bribing potential supporters with food. Maduro promised rewards for citizens who scanned their Carnet de la Patria at the voting booth, which would allow the government to monitor the political party of their citizens and whether or not they had voted. These prizes were reportedly never delivered.
