= 2018 Venezuelan presidential election =

- 20 May 2018
- Registered: 20,526,978
- Turnout: 45.73% (▼33.92pp)
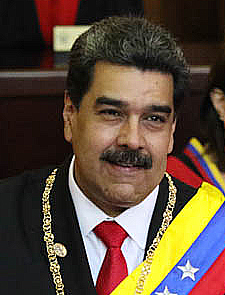

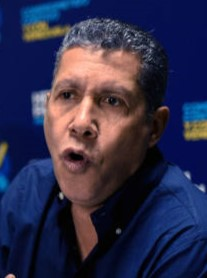

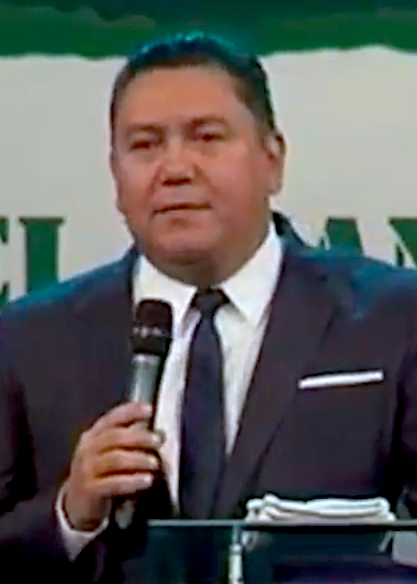
Candidate	Nicolás Maduro	Henri Falcón	Javier Bertucci
Party	PSUV	AP	El Cambio
Alliance	GPPSB	—	—
Popular vote	6,248,864	1,927,958	989,761
Percentage	67.85%	20.93%	10.75%
- Results by state

- Results by municipality Maduro: 40–49% 50–59% 60-69% 70-79% 80-89% 90-99% Falcón: 40–49% 50–59%
President before election
Nicolás Maduro
PSUV
Elected President
Nicolás Maduro (Note: Presidency disputed with Juan Guaido from 23 January 2019 to 5 January 2023)
PSUV

Presidential elections were held in Venezuela on 20 May 2018, with incumbent Nicolás Maduro being declared reelected for a second six-year term. The original electoral date was scheduled for December 2018 but was subsequently pulled ahead to 22 April before being pushed back to 20 May. Some analysts described the poll as a sham election, as many prominent opposition parties had been barred from participating in it. The elections had the lowest voter turnout in Venezuela's democratic era.

Several Venezuelan NGOs, such as Foro Penal, Súmate, Voto Joven, the Venezuelan Electoral Observatory and the Citizen Electoral Network expressed their concern over the irregularities of the electoral schedule, including the lack of the Constituent Assembly's competencies to summon the elections, impeding participation of opposition political parties, and the lack of time for standard electoral functions. Because of this, the European Union, the Organization of American States, the Lima Group and countries including Australia and the United States rejected the electoral process. However, some countries including Belarus, China, Cuba, Iran, Nicaragua, North Korea, Russia, Syria, Vietnam and others recognized the election result.

The two leading candidates opposing Maduro, Henri Falcón and Javier Bertucci, rejected the results, saying that the election was critically flawed by irregularities. Bertucci asked that the elections be repeated with Maduro being disqualified. Maduro was inaugurated on 10 January 2019, leading to a presidential crisis.

== Background ==
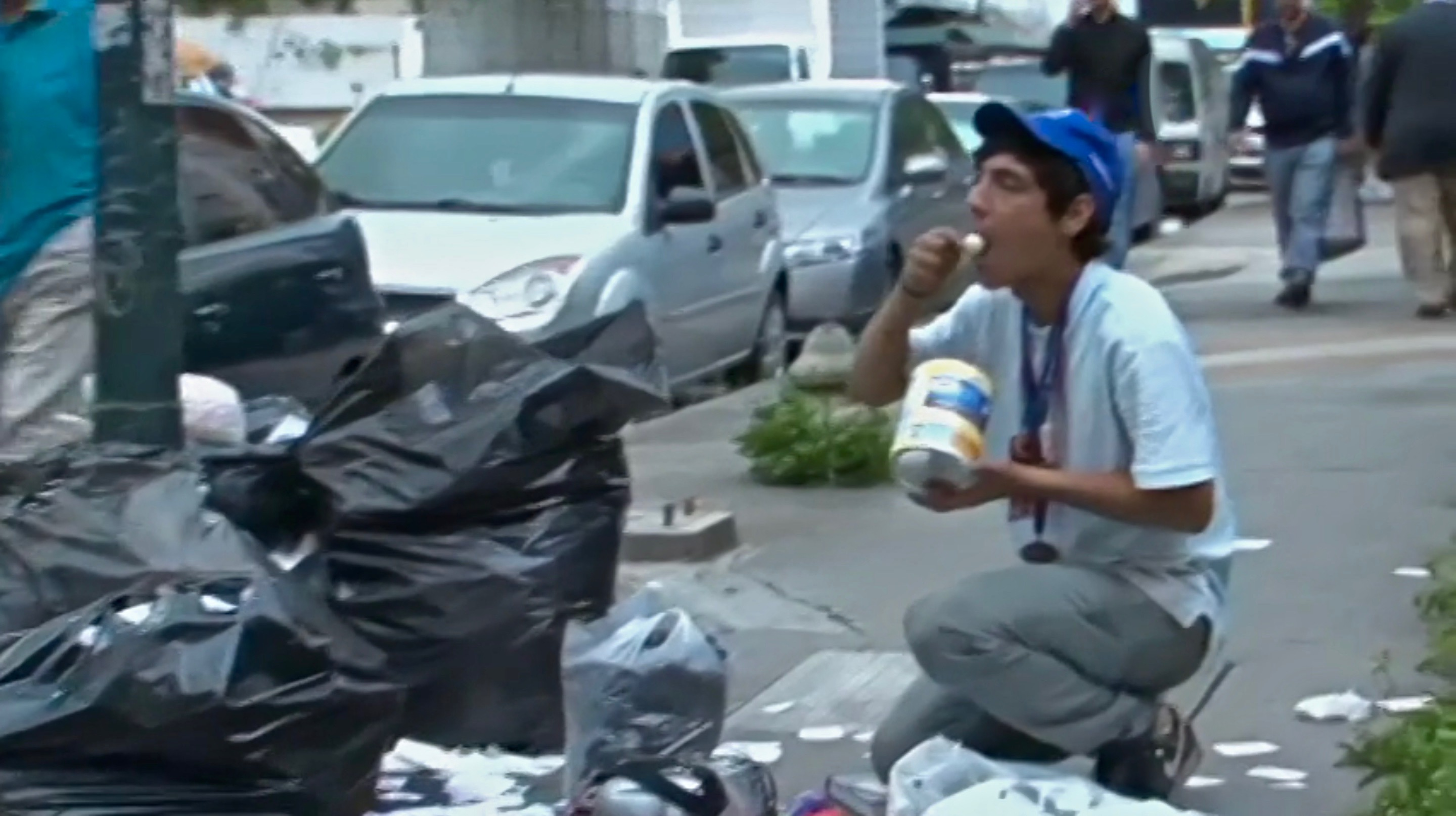
A man eating from garbage due to food shortages in Venezuela

Following the death of President Hugo Chávez in 2013, Venezuela faced a severe socioeconomic crisis during the presidency of his successor, Nicolás Maduro. Due to the country's high levels of urban violence, inflation, and chronic shortages of basic goods attributed primarily to the devaluation of the Venezuelan bolívar and to some extent due to economic policies such as strict price controls, civil insurrection in Venezuela culminated in the 2014–18 protests. Protests occurred periodically over the years, with demonstrations occurring in various sizes depending on the events Venezuelans were facing during the crisis.

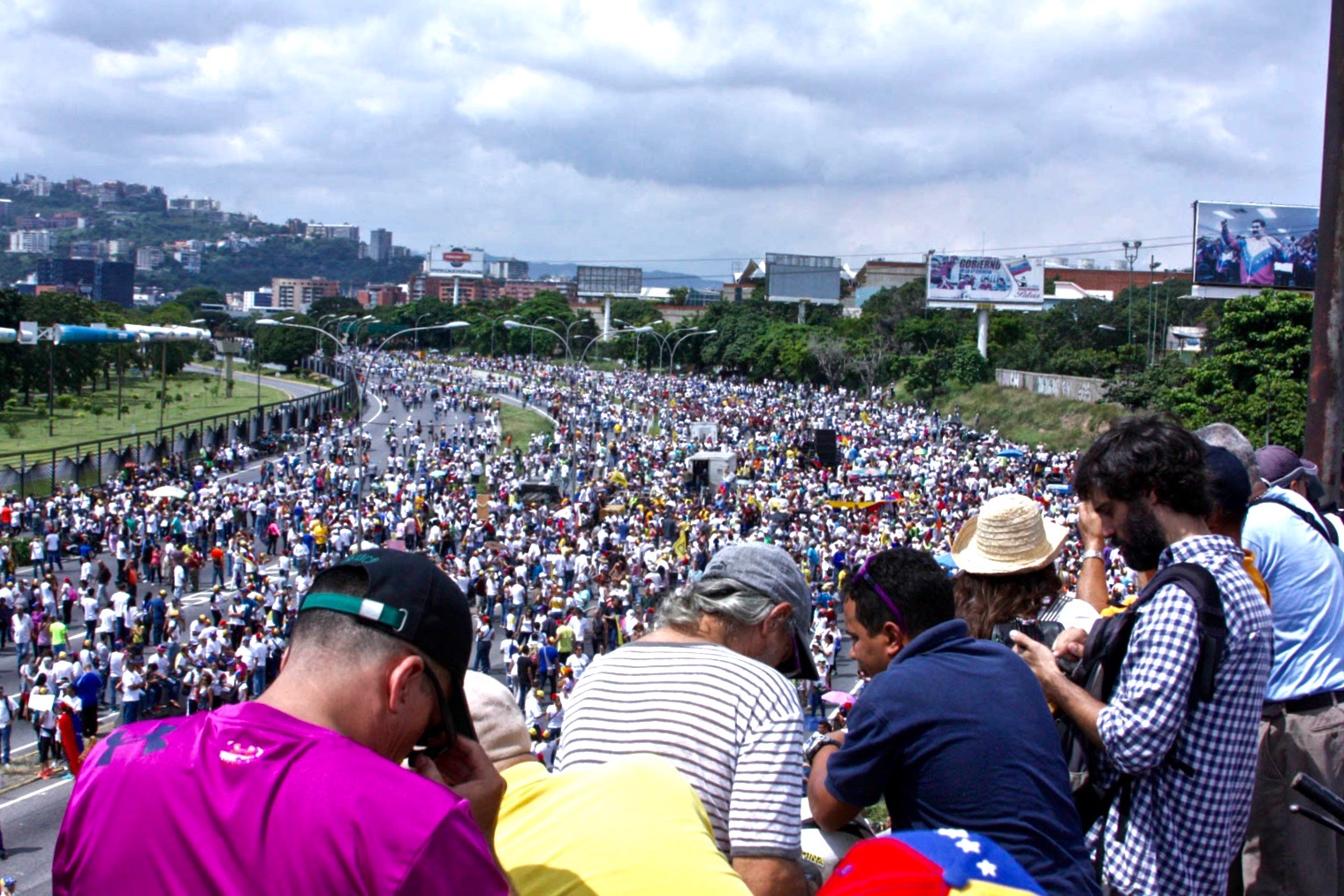
A 26 October 2016 protest that gathered an estimated 1.2 million Venezuelans following the cancellation of recalling President Maduro

After facing years of crisis, the Venezuelan opposition pursued a recall referendum against President Maduro, presenting a petition to the National Electoral Council (CNE) on 2 May 2016.

By August 2016, the momentum to recall President Maduro appeared to be progressing, with the CNE setting a date for the second phase of collecting signatures, though it made the schedule strenuous, stretching the process into 2017 which made it impossible for the opposition to activate new presidential elections.

On 21 October 2016, the CNE suspended the referendum days before preliminary signature-gatherings were to be held. The CNE blamed several irregularities and alleged voter fraud as the reason for the cancellation of the referendum. International observers criticized the move, stating that CNE's decision made Maduro look as if he were seeking to rule as a dictator.

Days after the recall movement was cancelled, 1.2 million Venezuelans protested throughout the country against the move, demanding that President Maduro leave office, with Caracas protests remaining calm while protests in other states resulted in clashes between demonstrators and authorities, leaving one policeman dead, 120 injured, and 147 arrested. That day the opposition gave President Maduro a deadline of 3 November 2016 to hold elections, with opposition leader Henrique Capriles stating, "Today we are giving a deadline to the government. I tell the coward who is in Miraflores ... that on 3 November the Venezuelan people are coming to Caracas because we are going to Miraflores".

David Vallenilla being shot dead by Venezuelan authorities during the 2017 Venezuelan protests

On 1 November 2016, then National Assembly President and opposition leader Henry Ramos Allup announced the cancellation of 3 November march to the Miraflores presidential palace, with Vatican-led dialogue between the opposition and the government beginning. By 7 December 2016, dialogue halted between the two. Two months later, on 13 January 2017 after talks stalled, the Vatican officially pulled out of the dialogue. On 23 January 2017, Henrique Capriles, a two-time presidential candidate, declared: "This will be the last conventional protest; the next one will be a surprise one". The opposition then began to focus on its electoral efforts, with only sporadic protests occurring for the next few months.

Following the 2017 Venezuelan constitutional crisis, protests in Venezuela intensified in mid-2017, though the movement died down after President Maduro called for a controversial special election, which resulted with the installation of the pro-government superbody, the Constituent National Assembly. Regional elections that occurred months later further cemented the government's power after they won 18 of the 23 governorships.

=== Election preparations ===
After the government overcame mass protests and won two major disputed elections, one of which installed a constitutional superbody, the government rallied behind President Maduro, with government sources stating that elections were to be moved ahead to February or March 2018 instead of the planned late-2018 date to take advantage of their electoral momentum. On 11 December 2017, President Maduro announced that many of the main opposition parties, including Justice First and Popular Will, would be banned from participating in the 2018 presidential election for abstaining to participate in the 2017 municipal elections.

In February 2018, the government announced that elections would be held on 22 April 2018, less than three months before the date. Popular Will announced on 16 February that it would boycott the elections. Following weeks of controversy involving international condemnation and rejection of potential election results, the CNE delayed the election for a few additional weeks pushing for a 20 May 2018 election date.

== Electoral system ==
The President of Venezuela is elected by plurality in a single round of voting.

The elections were overseen by the National Electoral Council, with poll workers drafted via a lottery of registered voters. Polling places were equipped with multiple high-tech touch-screen DRE voting machines. After the vote is cast, each machine prints out a paper ballot, or VVPAT, which is inspected by the voter and deposited in a ballot box belonging to the machine's table. The voting machines perform in a stand-alone fashion, disconnected from any network until the polls close. Voting session closure at each of the voting stations in a given polling center is determined either by the lack of further voters after the lines have emptied, or by the hour, at the discretion of the president of the voting table.

After the Agreement of Electoral Guarantees was signed on 1 March by the political parties Great Patriotic Pole, Movimiento al Socialismo, Avanzada Progresista, and COPEI, the United Nations was asked, with a formal invitation and visit by the main candidates or their representatives, to send a delegation to monitor the election. The Democratic Unity Roundtable (MUD) opposed UN electoral observation in Venezuela. In the end, the UN refused to send a mission.

The Carter Center turned down Maduro's invitation to send an observation team on election day, as did other election observing institutions.

Smartmatic, the electoral product company which had participated in the majority of elections under the Bolivarian government, ceased operations in its native country in March 2018, stating that they could not guarantee the validity of election results through its machines.

The election was mainly observed by allies of the Venezuelan government after many international bodies decided that there were no democratic guarantees in the country; the United Nations declined the invitation to monitor the election, after members of the opposition asked the UN not to send observers. On 23 March 2018 a United Nations official informed that the organization would not offer electoral assistance in the elections, without explaining the motives. Spokesperson Farhan Haq stated that a letter was sent to Venezuelan authorities regarding the request of electoral experts, but did not explain the content. These observers included the Latin American Council on Electoral Experts, Common Frontiers, Unifor, former Prime Minister of Spain José Luis Rodríguez Zapatero, and former President of Ecuador Rafael Correa.

== Primary process ==
=== Opposition ===
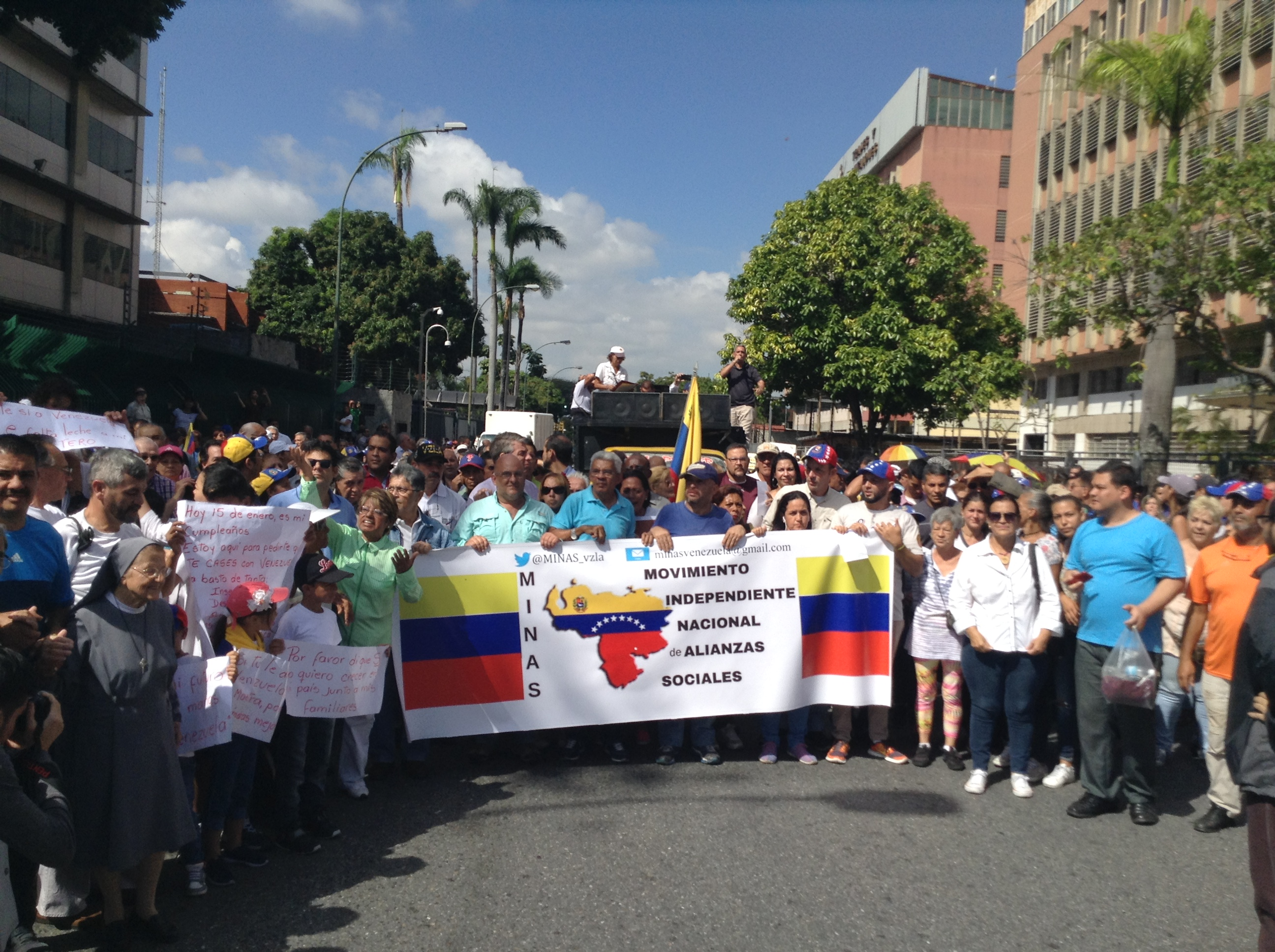
March in support of the candidacy of Lorenzo Mendoza on 15 January 2018

In March 2017, parties of the Democratic Unity Roundtable (MUD), the opposition's main electoral alliance, began discussion on who would be their candidate for the 2018 presidential elections. On 14 March 2017, Popular Will announced that Leopoldo López, the party's National Coordinator who is currently imprisoned for his role in the 2014 protests against the Bolivarian government, was chosen to be their candidate for the MUD primaries.

Days later, on 20 March 2017, Justice First chose Henrique Capriles Radonski to be their candidate for the primaries, his third run for the presidency, with his previous attempts occurring in the 2012 and 2013 presidential elections. On 21 March 2017, veteran politician Henry Ramos Allup was chosen to be the candidate for the Democratic Action.

In February 2018, the Democratic Unity Roundtable (MUD) announced that it would boycott the presidential election, saying the electoral system was rigged in favor of incumbent President Nicolás Maduro and the United Socialist Party of Venezuela.

Opinion polls

On 5 May 2018, a poll by DolarToday showed that if the elections were held on that date, 45% of the participants would give their opposition vote for Lorenzo Mendoza, CEO of Empresas Polar, 24% for Leopoldo López, 12% for María Corina Machado, 9% for Henry Ramos Allup, 7% for Henrique Capriles, and 3% for Henri Falcón.

Opinion polls
Poll source	Date(s) administered	Sample size	Capriles	Ramos	López	Others / Independent	Undecided / Don't know
Venebarametro	23 October—7 November 2017	889	12.6%	7.3%	23.8%	47.3%	9.0%
Hercon	20–29 August 2017	1,200	16.2%	8.1%	20.3%	16.4%	39.0%
Hercon	15–30 April 2017	1,200	25.1%	29.5%	–	4.9%	16.5%
Datanalisis	29 November–12 December 2016	1,200	16.9%	4.7%	21.2%	1.0%	18.5%
Hercon	25 September–10 October 2016	1,200	25.8%	33.6%	–	–	40.5%
Datanalisis	July 2015	1,000	17.3%	–	25.2%	12.7%	12.6%
Datanalisis	January–February 2015	1,000	17.4%	–	20.0%	17.3%	16.6%

==== Disqualifications ====
The majority of popular leaders of the MUD and other members of the opposition could not apply for the elections because of administrative and legal procedures and were disqualified from participating in the presidential elections by the government. This included Henrique Capriles (candidate in the 2012 and 2013 elections), Leopoldo López (sentenced to almost 14 years of prison during the 2014 protests), Antonio Ledezma (arrested in 2015 and later placed under house arrest), Freddy Guevara (whose parliamentary immunity was removed and fled to the residence of the Chilean ambassador), and David Smolansky (currently in exile), as well as María Corina Machado and Miguel Rodríguez Torres, former defense minister and dissident chavista, also incarcerated. On 5 April 2017, the Comptroller General of Venezuela notified Capriles that for 15 years, he would be prevented from participating in public office, alleging without offering proof that he misused public funds as governor, a charge that Capriles denied.

The main opposition political parties were disqualified after they were forced to reregister themselves for a second time in less than a year by the National Electoral Council (CNE) after not participating in the 2017 municipal elections. The parties Popular Will and Puente refused to do so, while the CNE prevented Justice First; only the party Acción Democrática was revalidated. In late January 2018, the Constitutional Chamber of the Supreme Tribunal of Justice blocked the revalidation of the Democratic Unity Roundtable card, the most voted in the electoral history of the country, and was also banned. Finally, Justice First was disqualified weeks later from the presidential race in early February 2018, leaving only Democratic Action and other minor opposition parties.

The actions by the government cleared the path for Henry Ramos Allup and his Democratic Action to gain popularity in the presidential elections. After many other opposition parties were disqualified, President Maduro singled out Ramos Allup and stated that he would run against him.

=== PSUV ===
Due to the perceived unpopularity of President Nicolás Maduro within the PSUV, it was speculated that potential candidates would include former National Assembly President Diosdado Cabello, Vice President Tareck El Aissami, and National Constituent Assembly President Delcy Rodríguez. However, Maduro was eventually chosen to run as the party's presidential candidate.

== Candidates ==
=== Maduro ===
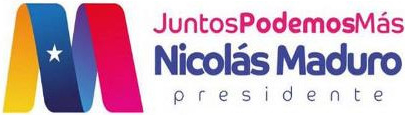
Nicolás Maduro's presidential campaign logo

Nicolás Maduro, the successor of Hugo Chávez who assumed and was elected to the presidency in 2013, ran for re-election. Maduro has denied that there is a humanitarian crisis in Venezuela and says that Venezuelans dying from poor health is "exaggerated", blaming many shortcomings on the United States. Maduro made the campaign promise of creating a "new economy" in Venezuela.

The Bolivarian government also increased spending on populist policies during the campaign to help sway voters to support Maduro. Analysts suggested that those policies would further exacerbate the negative effects of the crisis in Venezuela.

=== Falcón ===
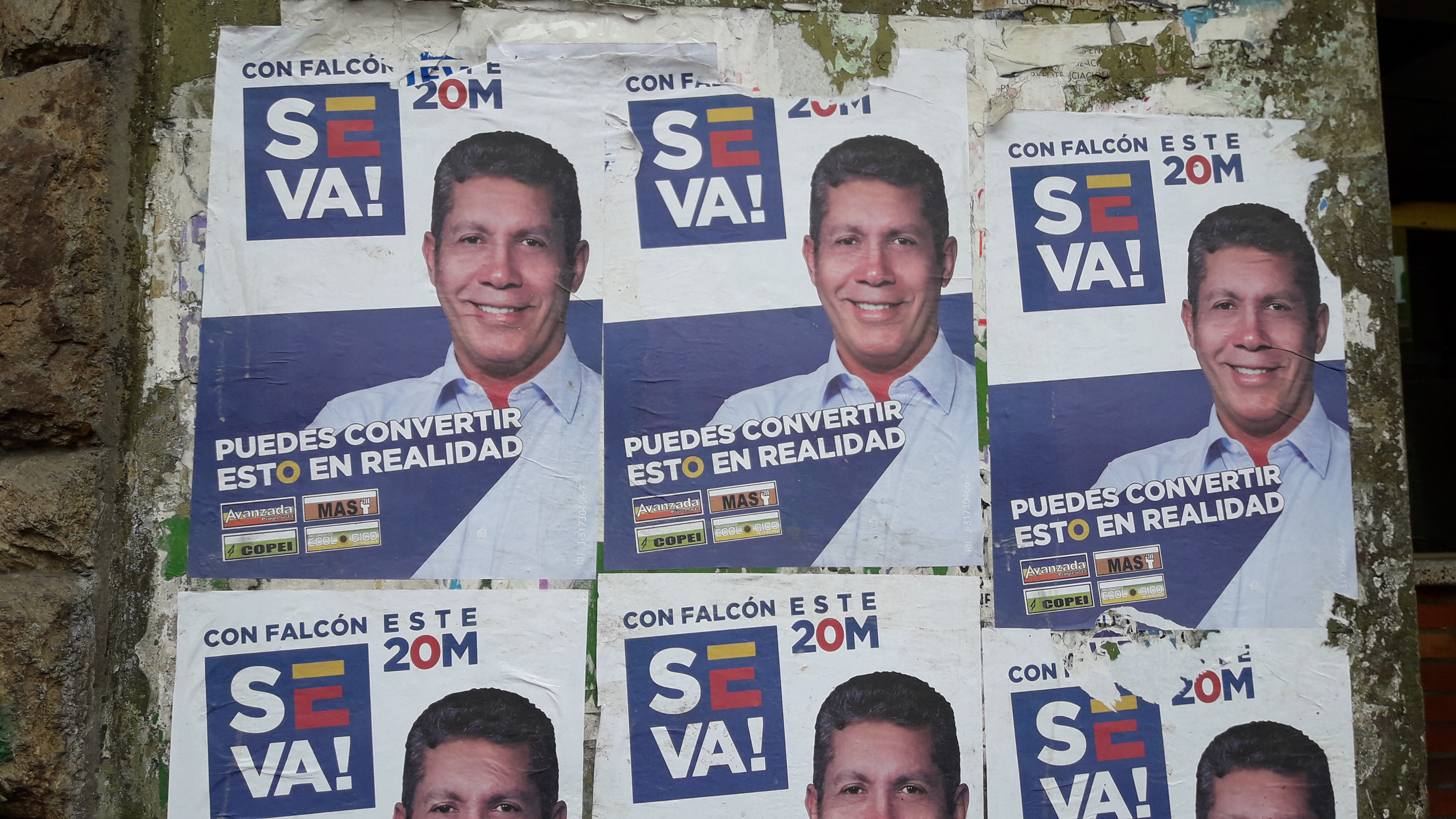
Campaign posters of Falcón in Caracas

Henri Falcón is a former governor of Lara who left PSUV in 2010 and founded the party Progressive Advance in 2012, which was affiliated to the Democratic Unity Roundtable until 2018. His political positioning was seen by some as a good way to govern from a position between the government and the opposition, though some Chavistas believe he is a "traitor" while some in the opposition think he is an infiltrator. Falcón was officially nominated as a presidential candidate by the Movement for Socialism on 26 February 2018.

=== Bertucci ===
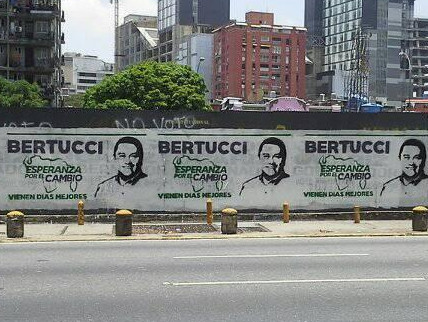
Wall paintings supporting Bertucci's campaign in Altamira, Caracas, along with a "no voto" (I don't vote) graffiti.

Javier Bertucci, an evangelical pastor, announced his candidacy on 18 February 2018. He emphasized bringing back the "values" of Venezuelans, stating that his church has cared for the poor in Venezuela. Bertucci is against abortion and believes same-sex partners should not adopt children, stating, "I respect and love any person who has a different sexual orientation, but in a legal sense, I would have to tell them categorically that I would never support this". However, Bertucci has said that despite his "absolutely conservative" values, he would hold a referendum on whether to legalize abortion and same-sex marriage, claiming that he would support the decisions of the people, "even those contrary to Christianity". Bertucci was one of the Venezuelan businessmen involved in the Panama Papers leak. On 18 February actress Diosa Canales expressed she was against the elections, but supported Bertucci's candidacy.

=== Quijada ===
Reinaldo Quijada an electrical engineer who follows the chavista movement, stated he would take up the "revolutionary process" in his campaign and that "we are certainly opposed to the government of President Maduro, we are certainly opposed to the PSUV, but we are not opposed to the revolutionary process".

=== Ratti ===
Luis Alejandro Ratti is a chavista businessman and evangelical pastor. He was formerly part of the Hugo Chávez Bolivarian Front until he broke ranks with the Maduro government. During his campaign, Ratti stated he would "represent the people with chivalry, bravery, and without fear, guaranteeing that they are going to have a different path than the last twenty years". After withdrawing from the Agreement of Electoral Guarantees on 30 April, he announced his exit from the presidential race on 8 May and threw his support behind Henri Falcón.

== Campaign ==
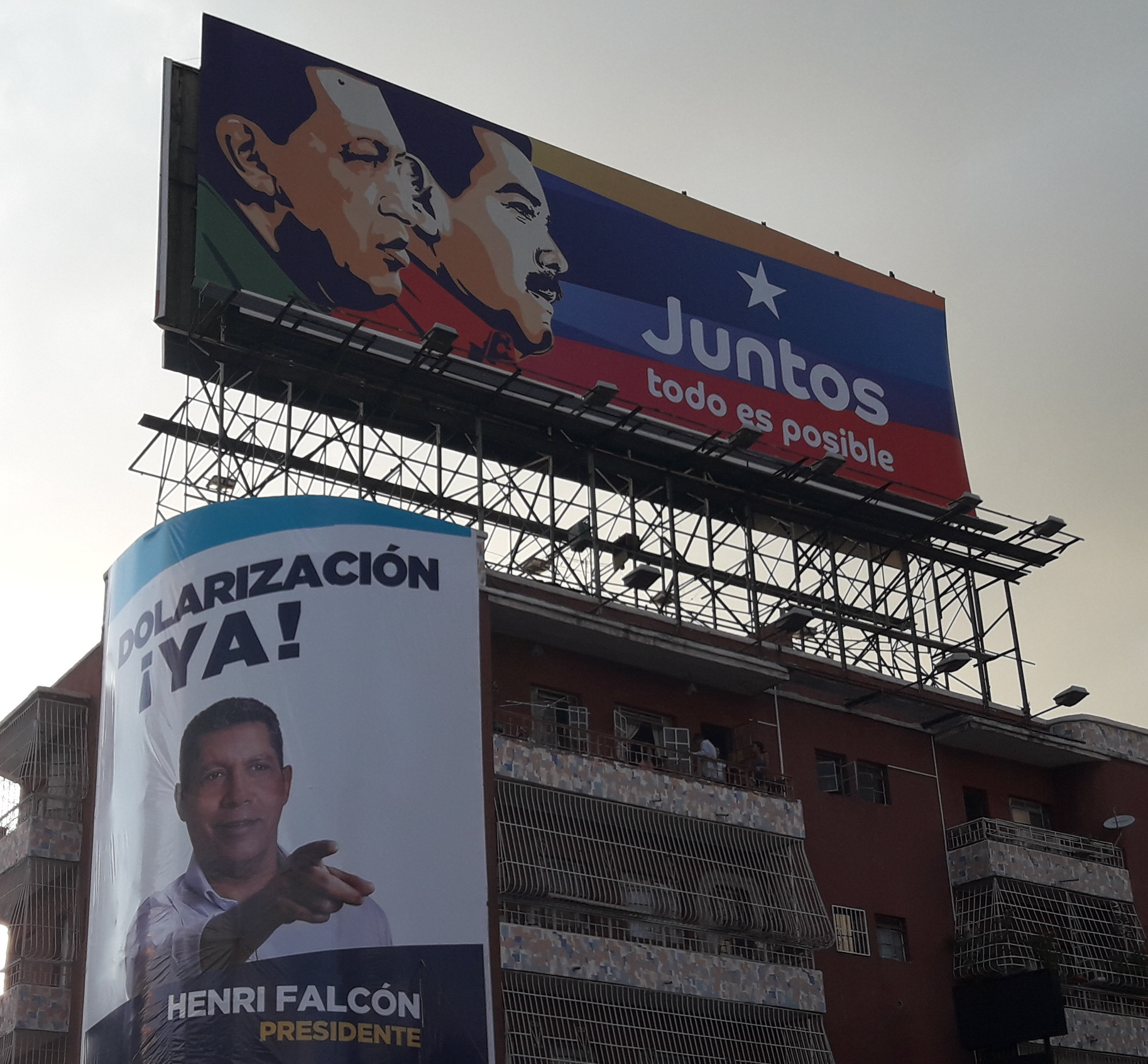
Two campaign billboards in Caracas of Nicolás Maduro and Henri Falcón.

On 2 April 2018, Falcón's security adviser Colonel Teodoro Campos was attacked by pro-government colectivos, with a head wound that left the deputy severely injured and later had him placed in an intensive care unit where he was intubated and placed on a ventilator.

CNE president Tibisay Lucena announced on 12 April that the political parties and individuals that promote abstention will be sanctioned. The campaign for the presidential elections and the legislative councils started on 22 April and ended on 17 May midnight. In late April, Maduro visited the state of Bolivar and stated that this "is a new beginning to get 10 million votes" and that "love will overcome May 20 over the lies, of manipulation and economic warfare".

On 24 April, during a campaign event in Carabobo state, Nicolás Maduro declared that during the electoral campaign, the government would call on all Venezuelans with the Carnet de la Patria to look after votes, assured that the closer they get to 10 million votes, "the more guarantee of peace, of stability" and of "economic recovery" there would be. Maduro called Henri Falcón "Faltrump" due to his dollarization proposal and labeled Javier Bertucci as "Little Soup Bertucci", referring to his charity activities of delivering soup to impoverished Venezuelans.

Bertucci denounced that his campaign manager in Sucre state, Ángel Arias, was shot in the stomach on 27 April while making preparations for a midday speech scheduled in Cumaná. According to a press release of Bertucci's party, a 25-year-old man shot Arias after trying to steal his cellphone; the robber did not achieve his mission and fled by motorcycle, leaving the manager at the scene. Aria was moved to a health center to be attended to his wounds.

I would take a rifle to start the armed revolution. This people will never stand a sellout and capitalist government, that is why we have to prepare ourselves to defend in peace the sovereignty and democracy of Venezuela

— Nicolás Maduro

On 1 May, in Cojedes state, Maduro threatened taking action against supermarkets and food centers nationwide if they increased the prices of products in the following days, declaring that after the 20 May election "I'll be president anyway...by hook or by crook"". On 2 May, Maduro warned in a campaign rally in Vargas state that if a "capitalist government" that handed over the country's resources were to be installed, he would take up arms himself to defend the revolution, stating "I would take a rifle to start the armed revolution. These people will never stand for a sellout and capitalist government, that is why we have to prepare ourselves to defend in peace the sovereignty and democracy of Venezuela", On 18 May, Maduro stated "Venezuela has become the focus and the elections in a world election ... I will accept the results, whatever they are". He said that his opponent Henri Falcón was the International Monetary Fund's candidate. Maduro affirmed not to care about the position of the countries that declared that they will dismiss the presidential elections, saying "What fuck do I give that Europe does not recognize me, that Washington does not recognize me. I care about what the Venezuelan people say".

On 11 May President Maduro said, during a campaign rally in Trujillo state, "Imperialism, go fuck yourself with your orders because here in Venezuela the sovereign people rules". Before a campaign rally in Charallave on 15 May 2018, President Maduro's group handed out free mangoes to supporters suffering from hunger who had arrived at the event. On 16 May President Maduro said that he foresaw a "great victory" and accused the US and France of trying to "put pressure on the country" to overthrow his government, saying "The Ku Klux Klan of Washington is pursuing us". Maduro also blamed Venezuela's economic difficulties on "the economic forces of the United States" and the "oligarchy that did not conform when it lost political power".

On 17 May the campaign closure rally of Nicolás Maduro took place on Bolívar Avenue in Caracas. During his speech of the campaign closure, Maduro expressed that Bolívar Avenue was "overwhelmed", but Winston Vallenilla once asked the assistants to come closer to fill the empty spaces and publications on social networks of deputy Luis Florido and other persons refuted the claim. Argentine former football player Diego Maradona and former reality star Tila Tequila participated and danced in the rally. The same day Bertucci condemned the international sanctions against Venezuela saying, "How can they ask for sanctions against the country. Oh, it is easy. They are abroad eating well, sleeping well, living in luxurious homes. Asking for the United States government to tighten sanctions, and to tighten the noose on the Venezuelan people. I think that is irresponsible. That's not what we need." A Venezuelan in Rome published a video explaining that he found a large painting on a wall promoting the vote for Maduro and complaining that the country's money is wasted on placing said messages abroad.

== Demonstrations ==
On 16 May the opposition and dissident chavismo called for a protest to reject the elections. The demonstrators marched to the seat of the Organization of American States in Caracas. In the morning officials of the Bolivarian National Police with anti-riot equipment forced the protesters in the Brión Square in Chacao to leave, arguing they did not have permission to meet in the public space. The Caracas Metro staff closed the Chacaíto station before the demonstration started as a security measure, as they informed in the loudspeakers to the users. Politicians such as Delsa Solórzano, Juan Requesens, Ivlev Silva and Andrés Velásquez participated.

== Opinion polls ==
Empty polling station in Caracas on election day

In a January 2018 poll surrounding the presidential election, Meganalisis stated that only 29% of respondents desired to vote in the elections and 72.5% stated that they did not trust the CNE electoral body. Those who chose not to vote had various reasons; 45% believed that even if they voted, hunger would continue, 20% believed it was a "waste of time", and 13% believed that the opposition had betrayed the country. As for the support of political parties, 81% stated that they were not part of any party, 12% were part of the government PSUV party, and 6% supported the opposition-led MUD.

According to Meganálisis, an April 2018 poll found that 65.4% of respondents believed that Falcón was working in collaboration with President Maduro to create the fraudulent appearance of a legitimate democratic election. Falcón disputes this, however, stating that "electoral boycotts almost never work. In country after country, opposition forces that abandoned the field of electoral competition have lost ground and allowed rulers to consolidate power."

Presidential election

Date(s) conducted	Pollster	Sample size	Maduro	Falcón	Bertucci	Quijada	Ratti	Others	None/Undecided	Lead
10–16 May 2018	Varianzas	1000	23.7%	32.2%	14.8%	–	Retired	0.8%	28.5%	8.5%
9–16 May 2018	Hercon	1000	28.7%	38.1%	9.3%	0.4%	Retired	1.4%	22.1%	9.4%
8–15 May 2018	Datanalisis	–	20%	33%	18%	–	Retired	–	–	13%
10 May 2018	Datanalisis	1,000	16.7%	27.6%	13.3%	0.2%	0.2%	4.7%	19.7%	11.1%
20 Apr – 4 May 2018	ICS	3,000	55.9%	25.4%	16.2%	-	-	–	-	30.5%
2–18 Apr 2018	Hinterlaces	1,050	51%	28%	16%	-	-	–	5%	23.0%
18 April 2018	Meganalisis	1,050	15.3%	6.2%	0.9%	0.07%	0.05%	–	77.1%	61.8%
11 April 2018	Datanalisis	–	32.0%	37.0%	14.0%	–	–	–	17.0%	5.0%
9 April 2018	Datincorp	1,996	22.0%	34.0%	9%	-	-	2.0%	33.0%	12.0%
8 April 2018	Datanalisis	800	34.0%	40.0%	–	–	–	–	–	6.0%
5 March 2018	Datanalisis	–	28%	39%	19%	-	-	-	-	11%
19–29 Mar 2018	Datanalisis	800	34.3%	41.4%	-	-	-	–	-	7.1%
27 Feb–4 Mar 2018	Meganalisis	1,090	13.7%	3.5%	0.03%	0.05%	0.01%	–	82.5%	68.8%
19 February 2018	Datincorp	1,499	28.0%	31.0%	-	-	-	31.0%	10.0%	3.0%
1–14 Feb 2018	Datanalisis	1,000	26.1%	38.0%	-	-	-	40.4% (Leopoldo López)	–	2.1%
24 Jan–13 Feb 2018	Hercon	1,200	19.5%	6.9%	-	-	-	21.0% (Lorenzo Mendoza)	26.8%	5.8%
8 February 2018	Consultores 30.11	–	32%	10.5%	-	-	-	25%	24.7%	21.5%
25 Jan–5 Feb 2018	Ivad	1,200	17.6%	23.6%	-	-	-	13.5%	10.6%	6.0%
22–27 Jan 2018	Meganalisis	1,120	9.4%	-	-	-	-	28.7% (Lorenzo Mendoza)	52.3%	23.6%

Date(s) conducted	Pollster	Sample size	MUD	GPPSB	AP	Others	Undecided	Lead
26 January 2018	MUD disqualified							
10 January 2018	Datincorp	1,009	55%	21%	-	-	4%	34.0%
10 January 2018	Datincorp	1,009	59%	19%	–	-	–	40.0%
14 December 2017	Delphos	-	52.8%	27.7%	–	-	10.6%	25.1%
7 December 2017	Venebarometro	1,200	46.3%	28.6%	–	-	25.1%	17.7%
10 Nov–23 Nov 2017	Datanalisis	997	44.4%	9.0%	–	-	-	35.4%
20–29 Aug 2017	Hercon	1,200	56.1%	15.6%	-	3.3%	25.1%	40.5%
10–17 May 2017	UCV	1,200	52%	14%	-	22%	12%	38%
28 Jan–8 Feb 2017	Venebarometro	1,200	44.8%	25.8%	-	23.4%	6.1%	29.0%
20 Jan–6 Feb 2017	Hercon	1,200	55.4%	19.9%	-	16.0%	8.6%	35.5%
29 Nov–12 Dec 2016	Datanalisis	1,200	58%	14.4%	–	-	9.6%	43.6%
15–30 Nov 2016	Hercon	1,300	53.13%	22.1%	-	15.53%	9.13%	31.03%
12–24 Nov 2016	Venebarometro	1,200	52.8%	26.5%	-	14.4%	6.3%	26.3%
20–24 Jul 2016	Meganalisis	1,220	66.1%	23.2%	–	-	10.6%	52.5%
1–16 Apr 2016	Hercon	1,200	73.2%	20.7%	–	-	–	42.9%
5–15 Sep 2015	Venebarometro	1,200	70.9%	17.0%	–	-	12.1%	53.9%
8–16 Aug 2015	Ivad	1,200	69.2%	18.1%	–	-	18.1%	51.1%
29 September 2014	Ivad	800	61.1%	26.8%	–	-	12.1	34.3%
4 June 2014	Hercon	-	62.5%	27.1%	–	-	10.4%	35.4%
10–22 Apr 2014	Venebarometro	1,200	49.6%	34.6%	–	-	15.8%	15%
10–26 Mar 2014	ICS	1,400	33.7%	55.8%	-	-	9.2%	22.1%
14 Feb–14 Mar 2014	Keller	1,200	48%	34%	-	3%	10%	14%
19–26 Jul 2013	Ivad	-	45.1%	39.3%	-	-	15.7%	5.8%
17 Jun–6 Jul 2013	Varianzas	2,000	50.0%	44.6%	-	-	5.4%	5.4%
2–11 May 2013	Hercon	1,300	54.8%	40.4%	–	-	4.8%	14.4%
28 Apr–5 May 2013	Ivad	1,200	45.8%	40.8%	-	-	–	5%

== Controversies and issues ==
=== National Electoral Council bias ===
While nothing in the Venezuelan constitution prevents elections from being called early, the Venezuelan Electoral Observatory noted that the call for elections was disrespecting the tradition of organizing them in December to avoid an extended transition, with exceptions in the year 2000 during the re-legitimization of all public powers by the approval of a new constitution; in October 2012 for the illness of Hugo Chávez, and in April 2013 for being an election due to the death of the president, maintaining that "the decision announced again showed the political bias of the electoral referee, since it included elements that made it difficult to have an election under equal conditions" and that the CNE" struck a blow to democratic plurality" by preventing opposition parties from participating in the presidential election. It also stated that since 2016 the electoral justice system administered in the country was "not impartial", citing the cases of the indigenous deputies of the Amazonas state who were dismissed from their positions for alleged irregularities in their election, which after two years have not been proven, while the fraud allegations made in October 2017 by the candidate to the governorship of Bolívar, Andrés Velásquez, had yet not been investigated.

=== Electoral Registry ===
The Venezuelan Electoral Registry determines the number of people that will vote and in it the voters that must comply with mandatory electoral service in electoral boards are chosen, as well as the regional, municipal and parochial boards for the elections. While in the 2012 presidential elections the CNE took two months to carry out the data update, migration and inscription of new voters in the Electoral Registry, in the 2018 elections the voters only had ten days between 10 and 20 February according to both the first 22 April and the definitive 20 May electoral schedules, both inside and outside the country, and the audits to the data were shortened from months to a few days. The Electoral Registry has not been audited since 2005, with no independent observation for over a decade by the date of the election.

It is clear that the CNE has done little to encourage the inscription of these new voters in the registry with institutional campaigns, breaking the current electoral law that which obligates it to deploy inscription and update centers in 'sectors of difficult access and/or of highest population concentration' in all the national territory and in any moment of the year

— Venezuelan Electoral Observatory

In 2012 more than 1,300 updates of the Electoral Registry points were deployed on a national scale, but in 2018 less than half were opened, 531. The Global Observatory of Communication and Democracy estimated in the report The Citizen Observation of the Electoral Registry 2017 that at least 1,769,035 young voters were not inscribed in the Electoral Registry by December 2017. For the Venezuelan Electoral Observatory, the "CNE has done little to encourage the inscription of these new voters in the registry with institutional campaigns, breaking the current electoral law that which obligates it to deploy inscription and update centers in 'sectors of difficult access and/or of highest population concentration' in all the national territory and in any moment of the year" according to Article 33 of the Organic Law of Electoral Processes, and that "what is needed for the citizen to exercise their right to vote is not being done".

On 15 February, President Maduro, without being an electoral authority, announced the extension for five days for the inscription in the electoral registry abroad and informed the opening of the Venezuelan consulate in Miami so that Venezuelans living in the city could make changes and participate. The second opening of the registry happened with the elections date change to 20 May and it was opened from 2 to 10 March. In theory, the registry allowed to update information or inscribe new voters for 24 days abroad the country and 19 in Venezuela, but electoral experts denounced obstacles for the inscription of Venezuelans abroad, because besides being insufficient it led to other obstacles that did not allow for more assistance to embassies or consultares. The electoral registry abroad only increased by 7,028 voters, which does not represent even the 0.5% of the Venezuelans estimated abroad. Nationally by 910,272 new voters were registered, adding to the 20,759,809 existing voters. Voto Joven complained because the consultes did not work on holidays, only worked on office hours without enough time or information, as well as the requirement to ask for a permanent visa to those who live in the countries where the opening was formalized, even though to vote only a laminated identity card is needed.

The Observatory also denounced that "The ER of Venezuelans abroad has been in a sort of illegal suspension since 2012, a measure violatory of the current electoral law" and that according to the last report of the CNE on 30 April 2017, the Venezuelans with the right to vote abroad are only 101,595 voters, "a number much lower than the migrants with the right to vote" in comparison to the estimates of between 2 and 4 million Venezuelans living abroad. Even though to vote only a laminated identity card is needed, active passports, original birth certificates, visas, residence letters, and other administrative requirements not covered by law were requested by consulates and embassies, preventing their participation in the elections.

=== Agreement of Electoral Guarantees ===
The Agreement of Electoral Guarantees is a scam for the citizen since it covers points already established in the Law and that the CNE has not met

— Beatriz Borges, Peace and Justice Center director

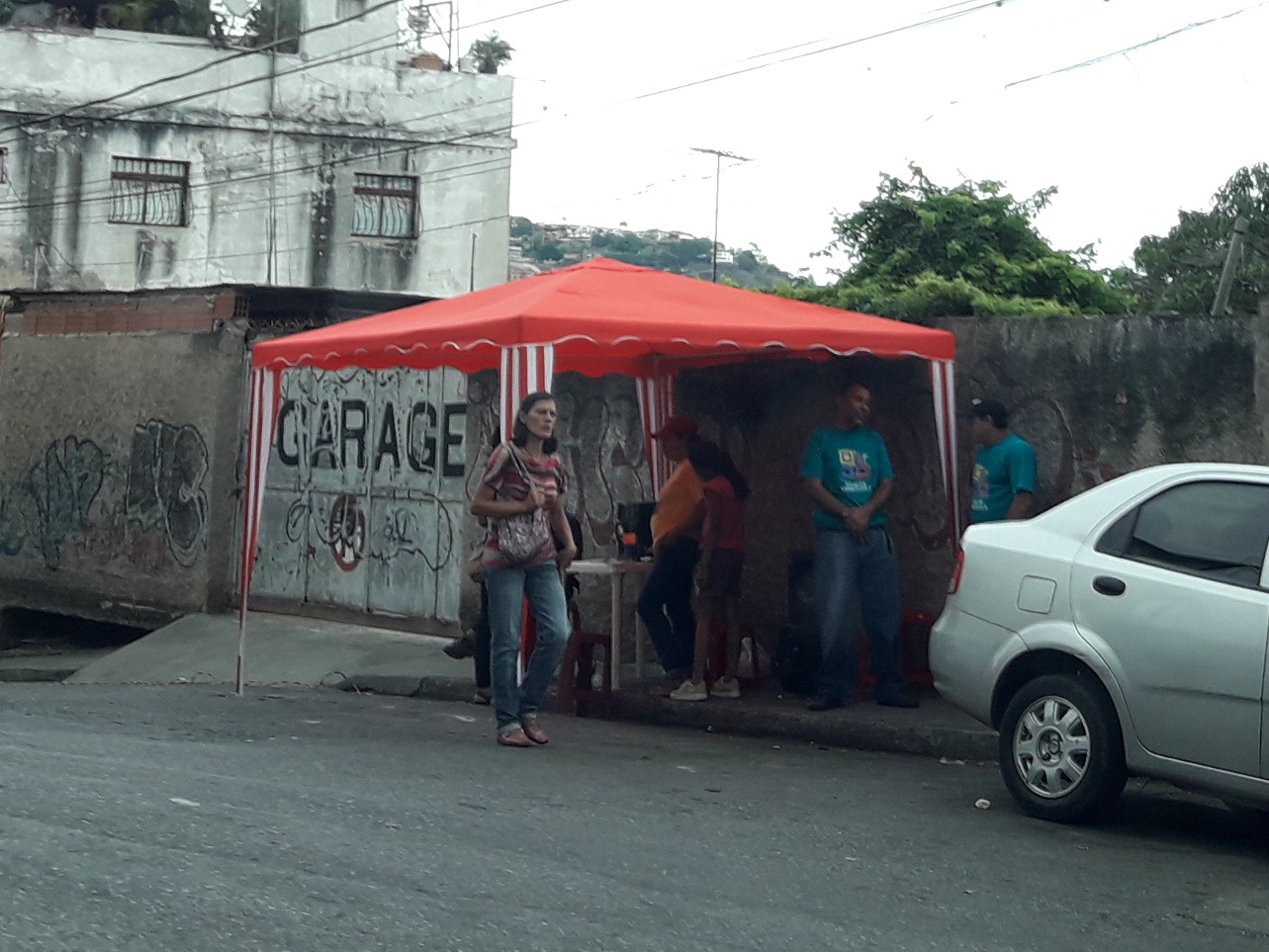
Red point in Caracas near a polling station in violation of the electoral norm

The signing of the Agreement of Electoral Guarantees by three of the original five presidential candidates – Maduro, Falcón, and Bertucci – was presented by the candidates as an extension of the electoral norms. The agreement included, among other aspects, the move to eliminate pro-government "red points" controlled by chavistas – which after the agreement had to be moved farther away from voting centers – the call for international observers and the return to voting center locations changed during the Constituent Assembly elections and the 2017 regional elections. The agreement has been questioned and rejected by the NGOs Voto Joven, CEPAZ, and the Global Observatory of Communication and Democracy. On 27 March, the CEPAZ director Beatriz Borges declared that "the Agreement of Electoral Guarantees is a scam for the citizen since it covers initiatives that were already established in the Law and that the CNE has not met".

Despite that the presidential candidates Henri Falcón, Javier Bertucci, and Luis Alejandro Ratti denounced the violation of guarantees provided in the agreement, on 2 May the president of the CNE, Tibisay Lucena, contradicted the complaints and assured that the Agreement of Electoral Guarantees was "fulfilled in its entirety".

=== Vote buying ===
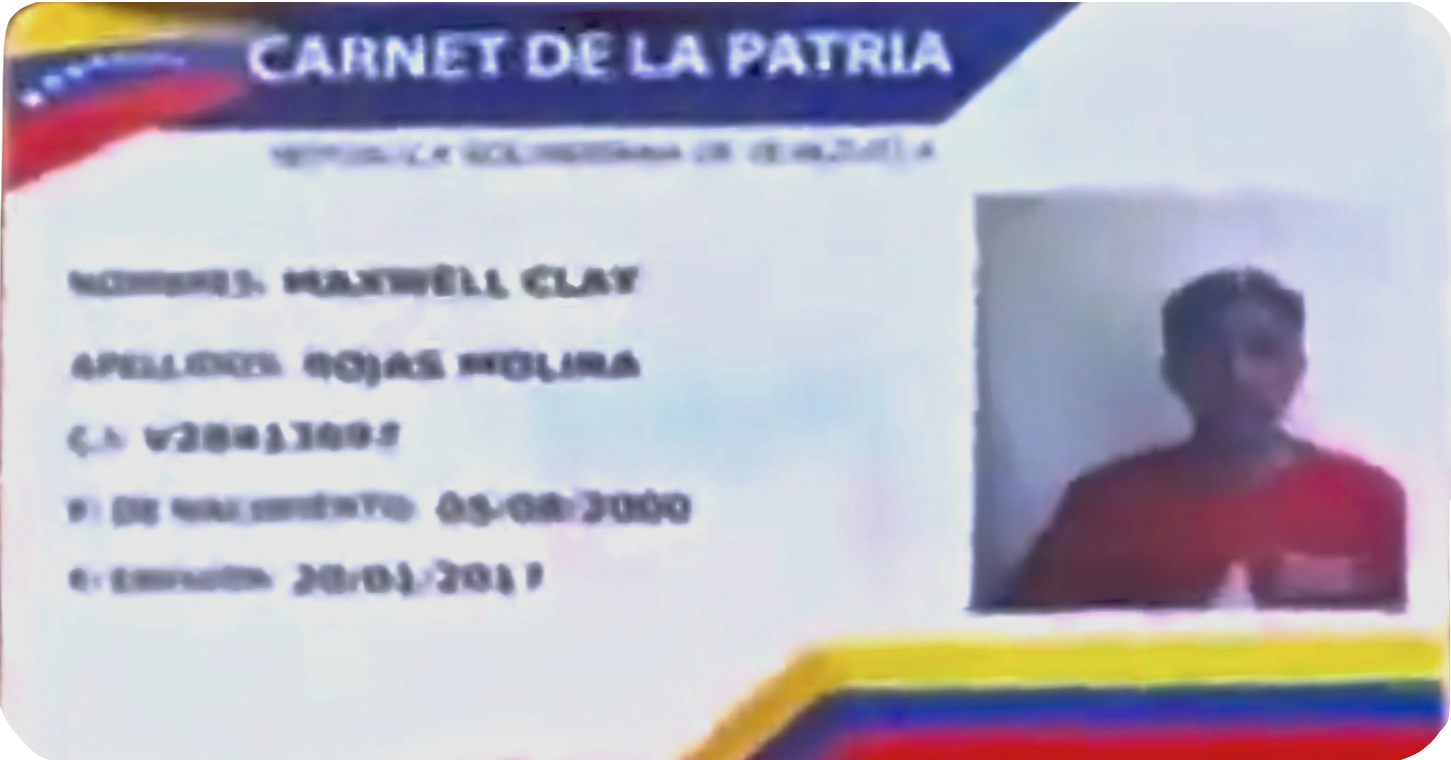
Carnet de la Patria

Reports of vote buying were also prevalent during the presidential campaigning. Venezuelans suffering from hunger were pressured to vote for Maduro, with the government bribing potential supporters with food. Maduro promised rewards for citizens who scanned their Carnet de la Patria at "red points" near the voting booth, which would record whether or not they had voted. Voters who scanned their cards would later receive a text message thanking them for supporting Maduro. People familiar with the system and cardholders said that these prizes were never delivered.

Everyone who has a Carnet de la Patria has to go to vote on 20 May. ... I am thinking of giving a prize to the people of Venezuela who go out to vote that day with the Carnet de la Patria

— President Nicolás Maduro, 28 April 2018

In a visit to Delta Amacuro, president and reelection candidate Nicolás Maduro gave away eight motor boats, nine ambulances, and reopened the "Antonio Díaz" Tucupita Airport, among other announcements, violating Article 223 of the Organic Law of Electoral Processes which forbids the use of state resources during election campaigns, as well as one of the prerogatives in the Agreement of Electoral Guarantees signed by the presidential candidates to the CNE. On 8 May Maduro again violated the electoral law during an electoral act in the Amazonas state by promising to give fuel to the entity in exchange for votes.

=== Medical care and voter fraud ===
Mission Barrio Adentro was a program established by Chávez to bring medical care to poor neighborhoods; it was staffed by Cubans that were sent to Venezuela in exchange for petroleum. The New York Times interviewed Cuban medical professionals in 2019 who had worked for Barrio Adentro prior to the election; sixteen revealed that they were required to participate in voting fraud. In the earlier 2013 election, four of the Cubans said that "command centers" for elections were placed near clinics to facilitate "dispatching doctors to pressure residents".

But they also "described a system of deliberate political manipulation"; their services as medical professionals "were wielded to secure votes for the governing Socialist Party, often through coercion", they told The New York Times. Facing a shortage of supplies and medicine, they were instructed to withhold treatment–even for emergencies–so supplies and treatment could be "doled out closer to the election, part of a national strategy to compel patients to vote for the government". They reported that life-saving treatment was denied to patients who supported the opposition. As the election neared, they were sent door-to-door, on house visits with a political purpose: "to hand out medicine and enlist voters for Venezuela's Socialist Party". Patients were warned that they could lose their medical care if they did not vote for the socialist party, and that, if Maduro lost, ties would be broken with Cuba, and Venezuelans would lose all medical care. Patients with chronic conditions, at risk of death if they couldn't get medicine, were a particular focus of these tactics. One said that government officials were posing as doctors to make these house calls before elections; 'We, the doctors, were asked to give our extra robes to people. The fake doctors were even giving out medicines, without knowing what they were or how to use them," he said.

== Conduct ==
The electoral conduct has been described as being fraudulent, with the call for an election by the pro-government Constituent National Assembly being declared unconstitutional in the first place, especially when the body moved the election date ahead from December to April. The National Electoral Council (CNE), which is charged with overseeing elections in Venezuela, is also controlled by Maduro sympathizers. The Venezuelan government has also been accused of excluding opposition candidates, handpicking candidates, voter intimidation, vote buying, and offering food to those who vote for President Maduro. No recognized electoral observers were reported to be present for the elections.

=== Announcement ===
The 1999 Venezuelan constitution establishes that the Electoral Branch, conformed by the National Electoral Council and its subordinate organisms, is responsible for "the organization, administration, direction and surveillance of all the acts related to the election of positions of representation of the branches of government, as well as referendums". Despite this, the Constituent Assembly issued a decree in January 2018 ordering the CNE to organize the presidential elections to be held in April. The Venezuelan Electoral Observatory declared that "the decision announced by the CNE evidences once more the political bias of the electoral arbitrator" and warned that 74 days are insufficient to guarantee the equality and transparency of the elections.

We deeply regret that elections were summoned without a broad agreement of its schedule nor of the conditions for an inclusive and credible electoral process.

— Federica Mogherini

The Observatory pointed out that phases of the process such as the selection of new board members, the choosing of subordinate electoral organisms in public raffles, the deployment of extraordinary journeys of inscription, the update of the Electoral Registry in a broad span that allows the incorporation of the largest amount of Venezuelans, the maintenance of the voting machines, the appropriate implementation of technical audits that guarantee the proper functioning of the automated voting system, and the organization of quality international missions would all be affected due to the lack of time.

The Electoral Citizen Network described as "irregular" the order of the Constituent Assembly to summon presidential elections before 30 April 2018, defining that it was a violation of the constitution and civil rights. Like the 2017 municipal elections, the announcement was made less than six months in advance, the time necessary to facilitate the lapses established in the normal electoral process. Súmate and Voto Joven indicated that this would shorten the terms of the Electoral Registry, generating a "hasty and little transparent process". The Electoral Citizen Network demanded the Electoral Branch the performance of special operatives for the inscription and update of voters in Venezuela and abroad.

Ramón Guillermo Aveledo, former executive secretary of the Democratic Unity Roundtable, compared the elections to the 1957 referendum of dictator Marcos Pérez Jiménez, noting that Article 82 and the Organic Law for the Public Municipal Branch specifies the prohibition that the elections for municipal positions are carried out along with the national elections, and that the mandate of the National Assembly ends in 2021, meaning that shortening its period, something not provided in the constitution, or the Venezuelan electoral laws, is "dissolving it", which would be considered "a coup d'état" against the Legislative Branch.

=== Electoral schedule ===
Two weeks after the Constituent Assembly ordered the elections and following the failure of the dialogue between the Bolivarian government and the opposition in the Dominican Republic, the CNE fixed 22 April 2018 as the day of the elections in a press conference, also announcing 15 audits and giving some dates, but without formally disclosing the electoral schedule. After changing the date of the elections to 20 May 2018 on 1 March, the CNE took 13 days to disclose the schedule. The Venezuelan Electoral Observatory and the Global Observatory of Communication and Democracy declared that the CNE has reduced the terms in each of the phases of the electoral schedule for the presidential elections since 2013, and in comparison to the 2006 and 2012 schedules with the 2018 one, the spans of the phases went from having up to three months to only two or three days in fundamental aspects, according to the last announcement of the elections. Both the time allotted for applications toward the Electoral Registry and the electoral campaigns were significantly reduced. To determine the electoral districts, the CNE must comply with the population estimates provided by the state-run National Institute of Statistics of Venezuela, which in turn requires the approval of the National Assembly first. This step was omitted and the CNE published the districts for the legislative councils at its own discretion, without disclosing its process and without answering any complaints.

On 26 March, the Peace and Justice Center (CEPAZ) denounced how the CNE changed the schedule of the 20 May elections "clandestinely and surreptitiously", what it constituted as "a new irregularity that prevents the adequate information about the electoral offers from being guaranteed and facilitated to the voters", referring to the modification made for the ballot choices by the political parties, electoral groups, indigenous organizations, initiatives carried out on 24 March and for the regional candidates, they were scheduled for 26 March in the 23 regional offices of the CNE. According to the Electoral Branch schedule published on 13 March, the choice on ballot for national organizations would be carried out on 21 March and in the case of the regional ones on 22 March, but each one was postponed between three and four days, prompting CEPAZ to warn that due to the "opaque and quiet modification of the electoral schedule", five days were removed from the production and distribution process of the invalid electoral ballots, "further diminishing the possibility of having voters informed".

The Venezuelan Electoral Observatory stressed in its report about the elections that the process for nominating presidential candidates was only allowed for only three days in 2018, from 26 to 28 February, while the modification and substitution of nominations, "the CNE enabled 118 days on 2012 and only 2 March in 2018 for this occasion". The Observatory also stressed that although the terms were changed to add the legislative councils, this did not mean a further extension of the days because "16 activities were compressed to be carried out in only 17 days, a schedule in which no task lasted more than eight days". The electoral schedule did not include national observers nor international accompaniment, which the CNE accepted until 2015. After the signature of the Agreement of Electoral Guarantees on 1 March by the political parties Great Patriotic Pole, Movimiento al Socialismo, Avanzada Progresista, and COPEI, the United Nations was requested to head an electoral mission, but the organization refused to accept the offer, even after receiving a formal invitation and accepting visits from principal candidates or their representatives.

=== Campaigning ===
It should be prevented that an official, such as the president, use the communication platform to take advantage of the other candidates. In this election there are several who have propaganda on television, but there is no CNE that limits the number of times that is transmitted daily neither the minutes nor the content

— Francisco Castro, national coordinator of Súmate

The presidential and legislative councils campaign started on 22 April and ended on 17 May at midnight, according to the schedule approved by the CNE. However, candidates postulated for the presidency or the reelection carried out activities with the electorate and exposed proposals that will be executed in case of being elected, violating Article 75 of the Organic Law of Electoral Processes. Francisco Castro, national coordinator of Súmate, pointed out that the CNE provided only 26 days for the national campaigning, explaining that the term "does not allow candidates to have enough time to promote their ideas and call for participation, so they are forced to anticipate their campaign. By tradition, the process lasts more than 60 days", noting that the CNE began the process only 80 days prior to the election of more than 500 positions, reducing the time of the activities. Equally, he indicated that the CNE does not regulate pre-campaign activities and stated that as long as there is not an explicit call to vote, then the candidate cannot be sanctioned. Castro explained that the pattern carried out since the government of Hugo Chávez is repeated in which electoral campaigns are used to inaugurate works and make promises. He continued by stating that the practice should be prevented, that "an official, such as the president, uses the communication platform to take advantage of the other candidates", saying that during the elections there were several candidates who used propaganda on television, but that the CNE does not limit the number of minutes, the content or the number of times that it is transmitted daily.

Ignacio Ávalos, director of the Venezuelan Electoral Observatory, and political scientist Luis Salamanca agreed that until now, an electoral environment or government project does not exist, but rather "a struggle to achieve power", stressing that electoral competition was suppressed and that an electoral campaign was designed for the United Socialist Party of Venezuela's own convenience. Salamanca asserted that "Maduro distributes benefits to obtain votes and Falcón offers benefits in the future in exchange for votes. Neither has enough weight to mobilize the country electorally".

The Tal Cual newspaper published an article describing Maduro's final campaign rally on 17 May as "the greatest demonstration of corruption", criticizing the "shameless" use of state resources, including the use of ministerial staff and publishing audio which revealed that promotion of the final rally was created using the payroll of government offices. Tal Cual also published the PSUV's operative plan of the rally, which did not include tasks directed towards PSUV party members but instead assigns responsibilities to the state ministries and other public institutions, including the mobilization of people. The operative plan details that the state-run oil company PDVSA installed the main stage, generators, the backing, and the sound systems, that the Defense Ministry was in charge of the fireworks detonations, that the Ministry for Mining Development was responsible for decoration and that other institutions were responsible for the installation of portable bathrooms, visual displays, barriers, awnings, and refreshments. In page six of the PSUV plan it is also written that the people that surrounded the stage from which Maduro was speaking were militias dressed as civilians.

== Results ==
By the time polls were to officially close at 6:00pm VST, it was reported by a CNE source that voter turnout was only 32.3%, the lowest turnout in Venezuela's modern democratic history since the 1958 coup d'état. CNE data would later show that turnout was 46.1%, a record low.

Both Falcón and Bertucci rejected the results, stating that there were too many irregularities. As the results were read by the CNE, many Venezuelans throughout Caracas began a cacerolazo protest against Maduro, with some beginning to barricade streets.

Candidate	Party	Votes	%
Nicolás Maduro	United Socialist Party of Venezuela	6,248,864	67.85
Henri Falcón	Progressive Advance	1,927,958	20.93
Javier Bertucci	Esperanza por El Cambio	989,761	10.75
Reinaldo Quijada	Popular Political Unit 89	43,194	0.47
Total		9,209,777	100.00
Valid votes		9,209,777	98.11
Invalid/blank votes		177,672	1.89
Total votes		9,387,449	100.00
Registered voters/turnout		20,526,978	45.73
Source: CNE, IFES

== Aftermath ==
Tibisay Lucena stated that the CNE forbade the payment to voters offered by Maduro. On 22 May when the CNE proclaimed Maduro as president, Maduro announced the creation of a presidential commission for economic advice. The same day, Maduro declared as personae non-gratae American diplomats Todd D. Robinson and Brian Naranjo, who had to leave the country within 48 hours.

In the week prior to the presidential elections around 40 military personnel from different parts of the country were arrested. On 16 May, officials of the Dirección General Contrainteligencia Militar (DGCIM) arrested 12 members of the National Armed Forces with the frigate lieutenant rank. Three days later, 20 military people were detained and on 21 May six more were arrested. Among the detainees are six lieutenant colonels, a first lieutenant and two sergeants, arrested on the charges of crimes against military decorum, treason and instigation of rebellion. Foro Penal lawyer Mariana Ortega informed receiving reports of arbitrary detentions.

On 24 May, Maduro took oath among the Constituent Assembly, a ceremony that should have taken place in January 2019 with the opposition-led National Assembly in accordance with Article 231 of the Venezuelan constitution. The National Assembly rejected the election's results, calling them an "electoral farce" and declared that Maduro must be considered "a usurper". However, Maduro's new six-year term did not begin until 10 January 2019, when he took his official oath at a public ceremony in Caracas in front of the Venezuelan Supreme Tribunal. The ceremony was attended by spectators such as Nicaraguan President Daniel Ortega and president of Bolivia Evo Morales.

Between the May 2018 presidential election and Maduro's inauguration, there were calls to establish a transitional government. CEO of Venezuela Al Día, Manuel Corao, argued that Maduro was no longer the president and that "the tendencies in Venezuela represented in the National Assembly [wish to] designate a transitional government that fills the vacuum of power and liberates Venezuelans from Communist evil". Former Venezuelan legislator Alexis Ortiz stated that "Castrochavism [...] rots in incompetence, corruption, and surrender of national sovereignty", calling on a transitional government to work on reconciliation, establish general elections, receive humanitarian assistance and protect civil liberties, among other requests.

A November 2018 report by the International Crisis Group said that "[n]eighboring countries and other foreign powers have taken steps–including sanction–to achieve some kind of negotiated transition, which is still the best way out of the crisis".

In January 2019, the National Assembly declared the results of the election invalid, and invoked clauses of the 1999 Venezuelan Constitution to appoint National Assembly Speaker Juan Guaidó as acting president, precipitating the Venezuelan presidential crisis. Maduro's supporters refused to acknowledge the move, and Guaidó was placed under arrest for a short time. Several international organizations and independent countries have lined up to support either side of the conflict, and the former Supreme Tribunal of Justice of Venezuela, in exile in Panama since 2017, has given its support to the legitimacy of the National Assembly's moves.

== Reactions ==
=== Domestic ===
The Democratic Unity Roundtable (MUD) opposition coalition confirmed on 21 February 2018 that it would not participate in the elections since they "do not comply with democratic conditions or guarantees". Henri Falcón, independent presidential candidate and former Lara State Governor, lambasted the Democratic Unity Roundtable for their boycott of the elections and stated: "You will disappear as politicians and as parties for not understanding the dynamics of a country that demands solutions and not conflict", and also stated, "four parties (those participating in the elections) believe in national unity".

Movimiento Estudiantil rejected the elections, saying they were called "outside of the lapses established by our Carta Magna" and stated that it they were "requested by an unconstitutional, incompetent body erected on the blood of hundreds of Venezuelans", considering that the elections are not designed for the Venezuelan public, but were created to "perpetuate the hell and the misery lived today". The movement stated that it would not participate in the process and demanded political leaders not to endorse the process.

The NGO Foro Penal decided not to endorse the announcement of the presidential elections based on the fact that the Constituent Assembly does not have constitutional faculties to summon an election because it is only empowered to draft a new constitution, assuring that it would be seizing functions from other political bodies when calling for elections and that the announcement is violating the right of Venezuelans to choose in valid and fair conditions attached to the constitution. Both the Episcopal Conference of Venezuela and the Venezuelan Federation of Chambers of Commerce (Fedecámaras) rejected and asked to postpone the elections in statements published on the week of the elections. The head of the Caracas-based Global Observatory of Communication and Democracy Griselda Colina and former Director of the Carter Center's Americas Program Jennifer McCoy concluded that Maduro's victory could not be considered democratic due to a wide range of failings in prevailing electoral conditions.

=== International ===
==== Supranational bodies ====
United Nations High Commissioner for Human Rights Zeid Ra'ad al-Hussein noted that his office had concerns that reports of extrajudicial killings cast doubts on fairness, stating "this context does not in any way fulfill minimal conditions for free and credible elections". On 23 March 2018 a United Nations official informed that the organization would not offer electoral assistance in the elections, without explaining the motives. Spokesperson Farhan Haq stated that a letter was sent to Venezuelan authorities regarding the request of electoral experts, but did not explain the content.

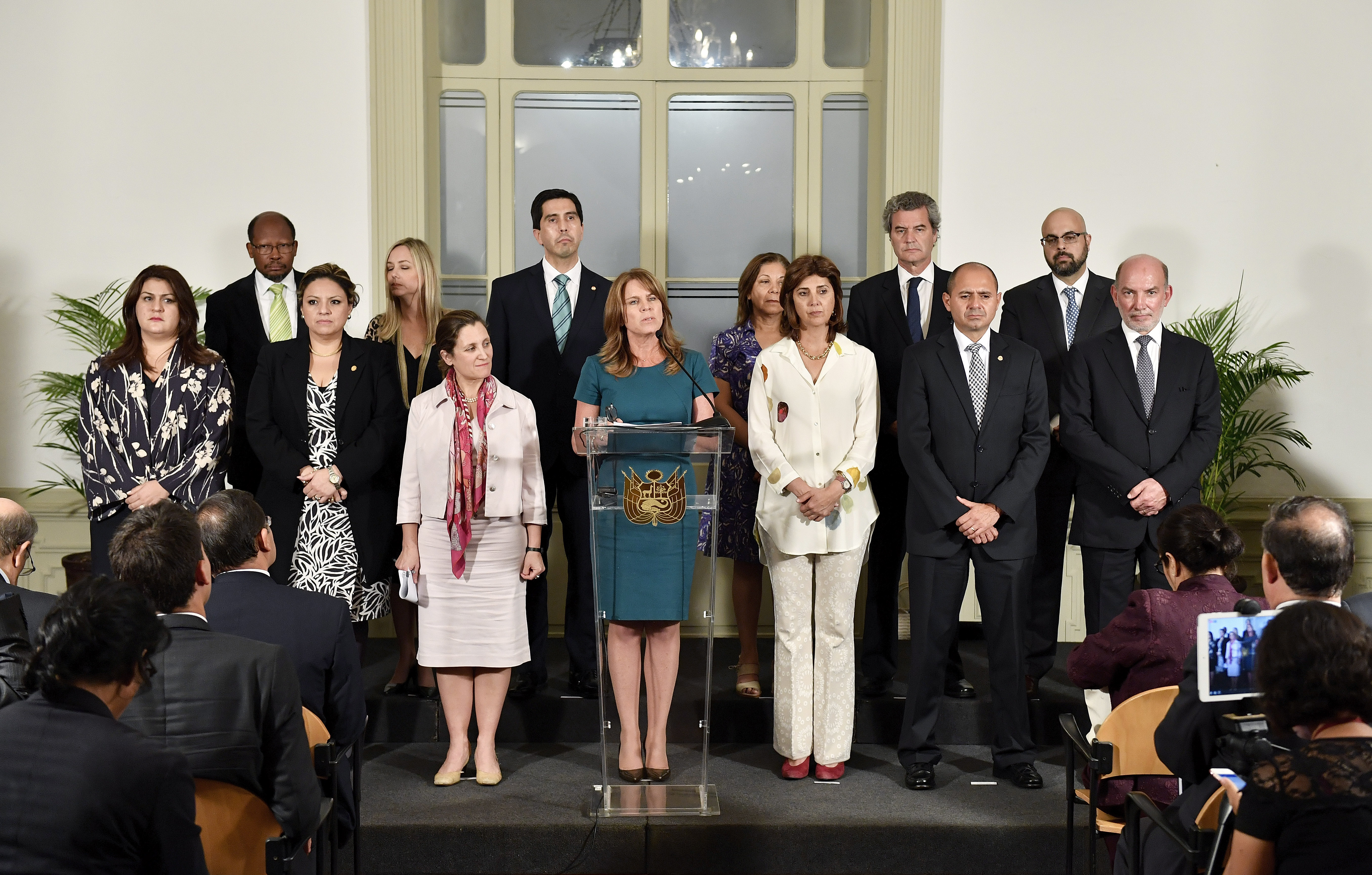
Representatives of Lima Group members gathered on 13 February 2018

Prior to the elections, the Lima Group, with its participating nations of Argentina, Brazil, Canada, Chile, Colombia, Costa Rica, Guatemala, Guyana, Honduras, Mexico, Panama, Paraguay, Peru, and Saint Lucia, stated that they would not recognize the results of the presidential elections due to the perceived lack of transparency. With the support of the Lima Group, the Peruvian foreign minister Cayetana Aljovín informed that the presence of President Maduro in the 8th Summit of the Americas "would not be welcome in said encounter", quoting the 2001 Quebec Declaration, which states that "the rupture of democracy constitutes an insuperable obstacle for the participation of a State in the Summit of the Americas". After the vote, Canada joined the group in condemning the election as fraudulent.

On 23 February 2018, at a special session supported by its Secretary General Luis Almagro, the Permanent Council of the Organization of American States (OAS) adopted a resolution that asks the Venezuelan government to reconsider the announcement of the presidential elections and to present a new electoral schedule to make possible the performance of elections with all the guarantees needed. The 19 countries that supported the resolution were Argentina, Bahamas, Barbados, Brazil, Canada, Chile, Colombia, Costa Rica, Guatemala, Guyana, Honduras, Jamaica, Mexico, Panama, Paraguay, Peru, Saint Lucia, the United States, and Uruguay. Following a meeting held on 10 May, the Inter-American Commission on Human Rights (IACHR) published a document stating that the process did not meet international standards, that the CNE electoral body was biased and that the "hurried announcement ... has seriously affected the warranty of the universal vote for the new voters and Venezuelans abroad", concluding that the election would not meet "the minimal conditions needed for the realization of free, fair and reliable elections in Venezuela".

On 8 February, the European Parliament, with 480 votes in favor, 51 against, and 70 abstentions, adopted a resolution demanding sanctions against President Nicolás Maduro, Vice President Tareck el Aissami, and other officials, considering them "responsible for the aggravation of the crisis. The European Union, through the European Parliament, also ruled that it would not recognize the 20 May elections and called the electoral process "fraudulent". On 3 May 2018, the European Parliament again called for the immediate suspension of the 20 May election until "free and fair elections were held on a schedule agreed upon with the participation of all relevant actors and political parties".

==== Governments ====
The governments of Argentina, Canada, Chile, Colombia, Costa Rica, France, Jamaica, Panama, Paraguay, Spain, the United States and Uruguay directly criticized the electoral process in various ways, condemning the disqualification and imprisonment of MUD individuals, the lack of advanced notice for the election date and the bias of electoral bodies, describing such actions by the Venezuelan government antidemocratic. Remaining member governments representing countries from the Lima Group, including Brazil, Guatemala, Guyana, Honduras, Mexico, Peru, and Saint Lucia, denounced the elections in a joint statement through declarations made by the organization.

Meanwhile, the governments of Antigua and Barbuda, Bolivia, Cuba, Nicaragua, North Korea and Russia reacted to the call for elections positively, showing support for the process and demanded that there be no intervention.

== Recognition ==
Map of countries which recognized Venezuela's 2018 presidential election Venezuela Recognize Do not recognize Not stated

=== Domestic ===
The opposition-led National Assembly of Venezuela rejected the results, calling them an "electoral farce". The Democratic Unity Roundtable opposition coalition formalized their dismissal of the electoral results on a legislative level.

Candidate Henri Falcón denounced the election before the announcement of the results. CNE rector and president of the Political Participation and Finance Commission Luis Emilio Rondón González announced his rejection of the electoral results, stating that "clearly they were flawed". Rondón offered the office of the commission to the candidates to file their irregularities reports that they exposed to "organize the claims that correspond to the clarification of all these aspects that disrupt the electoral process".

=== International ===
==== Unrecognized ====
The European Union, after calling for the suspension of the elections, stated that they would not recognize the results. On 28 May 2018, the Council of the European Union, with its members representing the executive governments of members states including Austria, Belgium, Bulgaria, Croatia, Cyprus, Czech Republic, Denmark, Estonia, Finland, France, Germany, Greece, Hungary, Ireland, Italy, Latvia, Lithuania, Luxembourg, Malta, Netherlands, Poland, Portugal, Romania, Slovakia, Slovenia, Spain, Sweden and the United Kingdom, refused to recognize the election results and called for new, democratic elections.

The Lima Group—comprising Argentina, Brazil, Canada, Chile, Colombia, Costa Rica, Guatemala, Guyana, Honduras, Mexico, Panama, Paraguay, Peru, and Saint Lucia—announced that it would not recognize the results. In written statements, the Group's members said they would reduce their diplomatic relations, consult with their ambassadors and summon the Venezuelan ambassadors in their countries to protest against the election for "not complying with international standards for a free, fair and transparent process".

The leaders of the G7 group, Canada, France, Germany, Italy, Japan, the United Kingdom and the United States, joined the European Union in rejecting the elections and denounced that their development did not "comply with international standards" and did not grant "basic guarantees".

Individually, Australia, Chile, France, Germany, the Netherlands, New Zealand, Spain, Switzerland, the United Kingdom, the United States, and Georgia also refused to recognize the election.

==== Recognized ====
Antigua and Barbuda, Belarus, Bolivia, China, Cuba, Dominica, Egypt, El Salvador, Iran, North Korea, South Africa, Russia, Saint Vincent and the Grenadines, Syria, Turkey (the only NATO member), Vietnam and the disputed state of the Saharawi Arab Democratic Republic (Western Sahara) recognized the election result. The Houthis (Ansar Allah), who took over the government of Yemen in 2014–2015, congratulated Maduro on the election results. Many of the Caribbean nations that recognized the election rely on Venezuela for oil as part of the Petrocaribe programme.

== See also ==
- 1989 Panamanian general election
