= José Bernardino Quijada =

Chilean educator

José Bernardino Quijada Vivanco (May 20, 1848 - date of death unknown) was a Chilean educator.

He was born May 20, 1848, in Lontué, Talca Province, Chile. His parents were Pedro Pablo Quijada and Carmen Vivanco. He did his first studies of humanities at the Liceos of Curico and Talca. He studied teaching in the classes in the Escuela Normal de Santiago. He started teaching in 1863, teaching primary instruction in the province of his birth, in elementary schools and secondary schools. In 1865 he was appointed professor and librarian at the Liceo de Talca. In 1869, he was appointed professor at the colejio of San Vicente de Paula. Until 1871 he devoted himself to teaching in various educational establishments in his home province. In 1872 he was appointed rector of the Liceo de Ancud, and was in charge of several subjects. In 1873 he was appointed city treasurer of Ancud. In 1885 he was appointed rector of the Liceo de Rancagua, in which post he remained for two years. At the founding of the Pedagogical Institute, he was commissioned by the government to make special studies in that institution, to introduce reforms in teaching methods of secondary schools. At the request of the Ministry of Education, he visited the liceos of Valdivia, Puerto Montt, and Ancud.
