= Reinaldo Quijada =

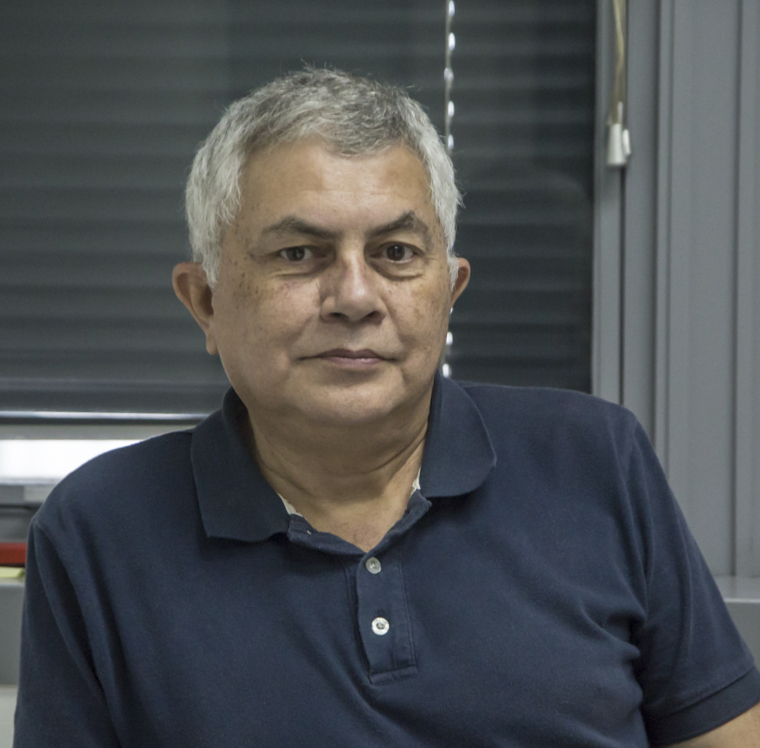

Personal details
- Born: November 21, 1959 (age 66) Geneva, Switzerland
- Party: UPP89
- Parent(s): Manuel Quijada; Evelina Cervoni
- Occupation: Electronics engineer

Reinaldo José Quijada Cervoni (born November 21, 1959) is a Venezuelan engineer and politician. He was a candidate in the 2018 Venezuelan presidential election, in which he received 36,132 votes.

== Biography ==
He was born in Geneva, Switzerland, when his father Manuel Quijada was representative of Venezuela at the UN. He was born in the Venezuelan embassy in Switzerland.

== Politics ==
In February 1992, when Hugo Chávez's coup d'état was carried out against Carlos Andrés Pérez, he openly supported it. That same year, he founded with other fellow activists, the Patriotic Front, which supported socialist ideas within the nation. In 2008, he became a member of the PSUV. That same year he was a candidate for the governorship of Miranda State.

In 2013, after Chávez's death, the PSUV underwent a series of changes that led Quijada, together with other members of the People's Electoral Movement, to abandon the idea of participating in the government of Nicolás Maduro, and in 2015 he founded the UPP89 party.

On February 21, 2018, he announced his candidacy in the 2018 Venezuelan presidential election under his UPP89 party, with the main platform of the campaign being to support a revolutionary process that Nicolás Maduro had abandoned. The campaign was registered with Venezuela's National Electoral Council on February 27. He came in fourth place with 36,132 votes.
