= Gilber Caro =

Venezuelan politician (born 1974)

Deputy of the National Assembly for Miranda

Personal details
- Born: January 30, 1974 (age 52) Caracas, Venezuela
- Party: Voluntad Popular
- Children: 1

Gilber Caro (born 30 January 1974) is a Venezuelan politician, activist and thrice political prisoner.

== Early life ==
Caro grew up in Catia, a poor area of Venezuelan capital Caracas, with many siblings. (Note: Efecto Cocuyo mentions two brothers, and in an interview for World Movement for Democracy his sister mentions another sister.) At a young age, one of his brothers died in an accident and another was sent to prison for a long time; his father then became an alcoholic. This left him to fend for himself, so he dropped out of school and turned to crime. He was frequently arrested for dealing drugs, and was eventually charged with murder and sentenced to 20 years in prison when he was young, ultimately serving 10 years in prison from 1994 to 2004, and was then released but on probation until July 2013; he says he did not commit the crime and that everyone in the neighborhood knew it, but they all also knew that if he told authorities who the real shooter was then he would have been killed for speaking. In prison he became a leader to the weaker men, formed a band called 'Carblack', and became a preacher. After finding his spirituality, he worked hard to gain respect and eventually was placed in charge of the prison cafeteria, protecting food to be shared between everyone.

After release, he studied law at Universidad Santa María, and has been a motivational speaker at other institutions, in prisons, and for the 2009 Venezuela national under-20 football team before qualifying games for the 2009 World Cup.

== Political career ==
When he was in prison, Caro listened to the speeches of Hugo Chávez, who he resonated with because Chávez had also been imprisoned around the same time and because he didn't like politicians, thinking they were "thieves". However, when he left prison after Chávez took office, he "felt that [Chávez] was going the wrong way". In 2007 he began working for Popular Will, and in 2009 he officially joined the party. In 2012, he was an advisor for the prison measures as part of Henrique Capriles' presidential campaign. Caro was first elected as an alternate deputy in 2015. One of the first things he mentioned as wanting the Assembly to achieve was an Amnesty Law to release all political prisoners. He was elected as a deputy in 2016.

=== 2017 incarceration ===
Despite having parliamentary immunity, Caro was arrested arbitrarily by the government on 11 January 2017, accused of possession of military weapons and US dollars, and treason. After his arrest, his family were not told anything and did not get to see him for 73 days. He was released on 3 June 2018, aged 43, having never had a trial.

In early March 2018, Caro was transported to another prison without the government informing anyone. Amnesty International then began investigating and asking for information, and a video of Caro in prison was quickly released to make certain his situation known.

Caro was released in the second round of political prisoners after Maduro won re-election in 2018, all of them directly transferred to hospitals. He was weak and unhealthy when he was released, having suffered from gastrointestinal and bone problems during his time incarcerated, and said that he had spent a year isolated in a cell, sometimes going a whole month without being allowed out of it. In addition, he was not allowed to see his lawyers or family, and went on hunger strike for eight days. He was also in the Fénix prison in Lara during a riot where 11 men died. He announced that he wanted dialogue and reconciliation of the opposition Assembly and the government, to help release more political prisoners. The terms of his release mean he is still considered on probation and has to report his presence every 30 days, as well as not speak about his case.

Four months after the releases, the military judge who had imprisoned Caro defected to Colombia after apologizing to him.

=== Activism ===
Gilber Caro strips in front of the Assembly

Caro has always fought for human rights, with his sister describing him as a "social activist", and particularly focused on political prisoners both before and after he was incarcerated himself. In 2015, he opened a training center for ex-prisoners, hoping to reform them, which he named after Leopoldo López. This built on his work from 2013, when he started several programs for social reform to help ex-prisoners and at-risk people, including the foundations Liberados En Marcha, Dale La Mano A Tu Par, Santa En Las Cárceles and Educando Por La Paz.

When Juan Requesens was detained and humiliated, Caro made an impassioned speech in the National Assembly on 14 August 2018, where he stripped to his underwear (like Requesens had been in a prison video) and said that a man's dignity is not measured by his state of dress, as part of national underwear protests in solidarity with his fellow politician.

=== 2019 disappearance and detentions ===
During the 2019 presidential crisis, Caro said that he did not want help from the "gringos" in the United States or military intervention to help Venezuela, saying "I am going to free my country". He later told Te Lo Cuento that "speaking in the first person" was a mistake, and that he meant all Venezuelans.

On 26 April 2019, Caro was detained a second time. The National Assembly considers that the arrest goes against Caro's parliamentary immunity. OAS Secretary-General Luis Almagro demanded “his immediate liberation”. The UN Human rights office demanded Maduro administration to update on Caro's whereabouts. UN representative Ravina Shamdasani insisted that Caro was not brought before a tribunal in the 48 hours after his detention as required by Venezuelan law. Amnesty International requested the Bolivarian Intelligence Service to handle information on Caro's whereabouts. Guaidó, the National Assembly, OAS General Secretary Almagro and the UN Human Rights office condemned the new arrest as a violation of parliamentary immunity.

On 15 May, the Inter-American Commission on Human Rights (IACHR) issued a protective measure on Gilber Caro and gave 7 working days to Maduro administration to report on Caro's well-being and process. By 24 May, Caro had still not been seen; his lawyer was informed that he was held at El Helicoide, but when people tried to reach him the guards at Helicoide said he was not being held there. One of Caro's sisters suggested that they were not allowed to see him because the guards "did something to him". On 30 May, magistrates announced that Caro would have a court hearing that day, to happen at Fort Paramacay in Naguanagua, but this did not happen; the court explained that it is not permitted to transport prisoners from Helicoide to Paramacay and so the hearing could not happen.

On the evening of Monday 17 June, Caro was released. He was received by delegates from the Grupo de Boston, though his condition is unknown. Voice of America report that his freedom comes only a few days before the UN Human Rights Commission's planned inspection on 19 June. Though his lawyers informed the press, the Grupo de Boston were the first to know of his release.

On 20 December, Caro was detained for a third time. Four other lawmakers were also indicted in December; Popular Will consider that Caro's detention is part of a series of actions by the Maduro administration to force a boycott of the reelection of Juan Guaidó as President of the National Assembly on 5 January 2020. On 21 January 2020, Caro's lawyer confirmed that the lawmaker was detained by Venezuelan special police forces (FAES). The lawyer was not allowed to disclose Caro's whereabouts. FAES operations usually focus on poor neighborhoods and the squad has been accused of carrying thousands of extrajudicial killings. This arrest would be the first time that FAES deals with a public figure.

== 2024 arrest in Miami ==
Caro was arrested on 3 September 2024, in Miami for fleeing the scene following a deadly hit-and-run crash. He has been charged with leaving the scene of the crash. He will face additional charges after police viewed video which showed the fatal crash was caused by Caro running a red light.

== Personal life ==
Caro has a daughter, and he also began acting as a paternal figure to his nephew after his sister's husband died. At least one of his sisters has left Venezuela, a departure he missed whilst in prison.

== See also ==
- Political prisoners in Venezuela
- Enforced disappearances in Venezuela
