= Geraldine Chacón =

Venezuelan lawyer and human rights advocate

- Geraldine Chacón in Bolívar Square, Caracas, July 2018.
- Born: Geraldine Patricia Chacón Villarroel; December 23, 1993 (age 32); Caracas, Venezuela
- Education: Universidad Metropolitana

Geraldine Patricia Chacón Villarroel (born 23 December 1993, in Caracas, Venezuela) is a lawyer and human rights advocate.

Chacón was arrested by the Bolivarian National Intelligence Service (Servicio Bolivariano de Inteligencia Nacional, SEBIN) in the early hours of the morning of 1 February 2018, without warrants and under false pretenses. She was taken to El Helicoide for questioning and detained there. Legal orders for her release, issued by the Venezuelan judicial system, were ignored by the prison authorities. She was declared a prisoner of conscience by Amnesty International who issued an urgent action calling for her immediate and unconditional release on 27 April 2018.

Chacón was finally conditionally released on 1 June 2018. Amnesty continues to consider her at risk and to appeal on her behalf.

== Education and career ==
Geraldine Chacón was motivated to become a lawyer from an early age. At age 14, she participated in local city youth government.

As of 2010 Chacón attended the Universidad Metropolitana (Metropolitan University) where she pursued a law degree. Her academic work included the study of 19th century etiquette and citizenship manuals for young people, written by Colombian author Pío del Castillo. She was an exchange student at the Institut d'Etudes Politiques de Paris (Sciences Po) in Paris, France in 2013–2014.

She returned to Metropolitan University to complete her law degree and study Liberal Studies. She was a student in that program at the time of her arrest. On 9 April 2018, the Academic Council of the Metropolitan University published a statement in her support. She could not attend graduation to receive her law degree because she was in prison.

Chacón worked as a litigation and court assistant in a legal firm, and in the Legal Consultancy for the Central Bank of Venezuela.

== Advocacy and human rights ==
Chacón served as director of her university's newspaper Naranja Pelada (The Peeled Orange).

In 2012, Chacón was the founder of the Amnesty International Venezuela Network at the Universidad Metropolitana (UNIMET Network).

Chacón worked as a volunteer with the Latin American nonprofit organization Un Techo para mi País whose goal is to provide safe housing.

=== Community Ambassadors Foundation ===
Around 2015, as part of her community service while at university, Chacón began to volunteer with the Community Ambassadors Foundation (Fundación Embajadores Comunitarios, FEC), an NGO founded in 2008 by university students to empower and support youth from vulnerable communities in Caracas. After completing her service requirements, she continued to work with the organization, eventually becoming one of its directors.

The Community Ambassadors Program implements a program of youth empowerment through the development of skills such as oratory, leadership, negotiation, peaceful resolution of conflicts and critical thinking, organized around the Model of the United Nations. It has been reported to have reached over as many as 1000 individuals in 3 cities, 11 communities and 13 educational institutions in Venezuela, including Filas de Mariche (Miranda state), Petare, Chacao, Catia, San Agustín del Sur, La Vega and Antímano (Caracas).

== Detention ==
On 31 January 2018 at noon, SEBIN officials searched the offices of the Community Ambassadors Foundation, without a court order or witnesses to the proceedings. The house of Geraldine Chacón was raided in the early morning of 1 February 2018 by SEBIN officials. Chacón was told that she was going to be interviewed and was taken to El Helicoide, where she was detained, in spite of the officers not having an arrest warrant. The homes of other directors of the Community Ambassadors Foundation were also visited by SEBIN.

At a hearing held on 5 February 2018 Geraldine Chacón was charged with public gathering and instigation, as was Gregory Hinds, another director of the Community Ambassadors Foundation. Hinds and Chacón were not allowed to see their families or their lawyers, before being brought into court. The court supported their release on bail during the initial investigation, on the condition that two people be appointed to act as guarantors of their reappearance, with appropriate documentation. The requested forms were presented by the guarantors, but Chacón and Hinds were not released.

On 2 April 2018, a Venezuelan judge issued a release letter for Geraldine Chacón on the grounds that prosecutors had failed to present formal charges within 45 days, as required under Venezuelan law. However, officials at the SEBIN facilities, both in the administrative headquarters and in the detention center, repeatedly declared that they had no such order ("no tienen órdenes para acatar") and Chacón remained in arbitrary detention. SEBIN officials told relatives and lawyers that they were unaware of the location of any release order, and had not received it.

=== Prisoner of conscience ===
Geraldine Chacón was declared a prisoner of conscience by Amnesty International and an urgent action was sent out on her behalf as of 27 April 2018. A prisoner of conscience (POC) is a prisoner of conscience or people who, although they have not advocated or resorted to violence, have been imprisoned for being who they are (because of their sexual orientation, origin ethnic, national or social, language, birth, color, sex or economic situation) or by what they believe in (for their beliefs, political ideas or other deep convictions).

=== Hunger strike ===
On 16 May 2018, detainees in El Helicoide staged a peaceful protest, barricading themselves in a section of the cells and requesting independent mediation by the Catholic Church and other organizations. One of their requests was that judicial release orders of detainees such as Hinds and Chacón be honored. On 18 May 2018, Chacón was one of 18 women who went on a hunger strike.

=== Appeal to the United Nations ===
On 31 May 2018, appeals were presented to the United Nations Working Group on Arbitrary Detention, on behalf of Geraldine Chacón and Gregory Hinds, by the Observatory for the Protection of Human Rights Defenders and COFAVIC (Comité de Familiares de Victimas, Relatives of Victims Committee). At that time, Chacón and Hinds had been imprisoned for 120 and 121 days respectively.

=== Prison conditions ===
Geraldine Chacón was held in a cell with 25 women, with little or no access to drinking water, clean clothes, sanitary facilities, medicines or other medical services. She was not allowed to go outside in the sunlight, to see family members or to see her lawyers. Information on her condition was available only indirectly through reports from people who managed to visit their relatives in the same cell as Geraldine. It was left to her mother, Natividad Villarroel, to attempt to supply her with 15 liters of water a week, medicines and personal hygiene items. There was concern that the "conditions of detention could constitute torture or cruel, inhuman or degrading treatment".

== Release ==
Chacón was conditionally released on 1 June 2018, one of a group of 87 political prisoners released at that time. Her release included a number of legal restrictions, including limiting her contact with media outlets. Her risk of re-imprisonment remains high.

== See also ==
- Political prisoners in Venezuela
