= Luis Carlos Díaz =

Venezuelan journalist and activist

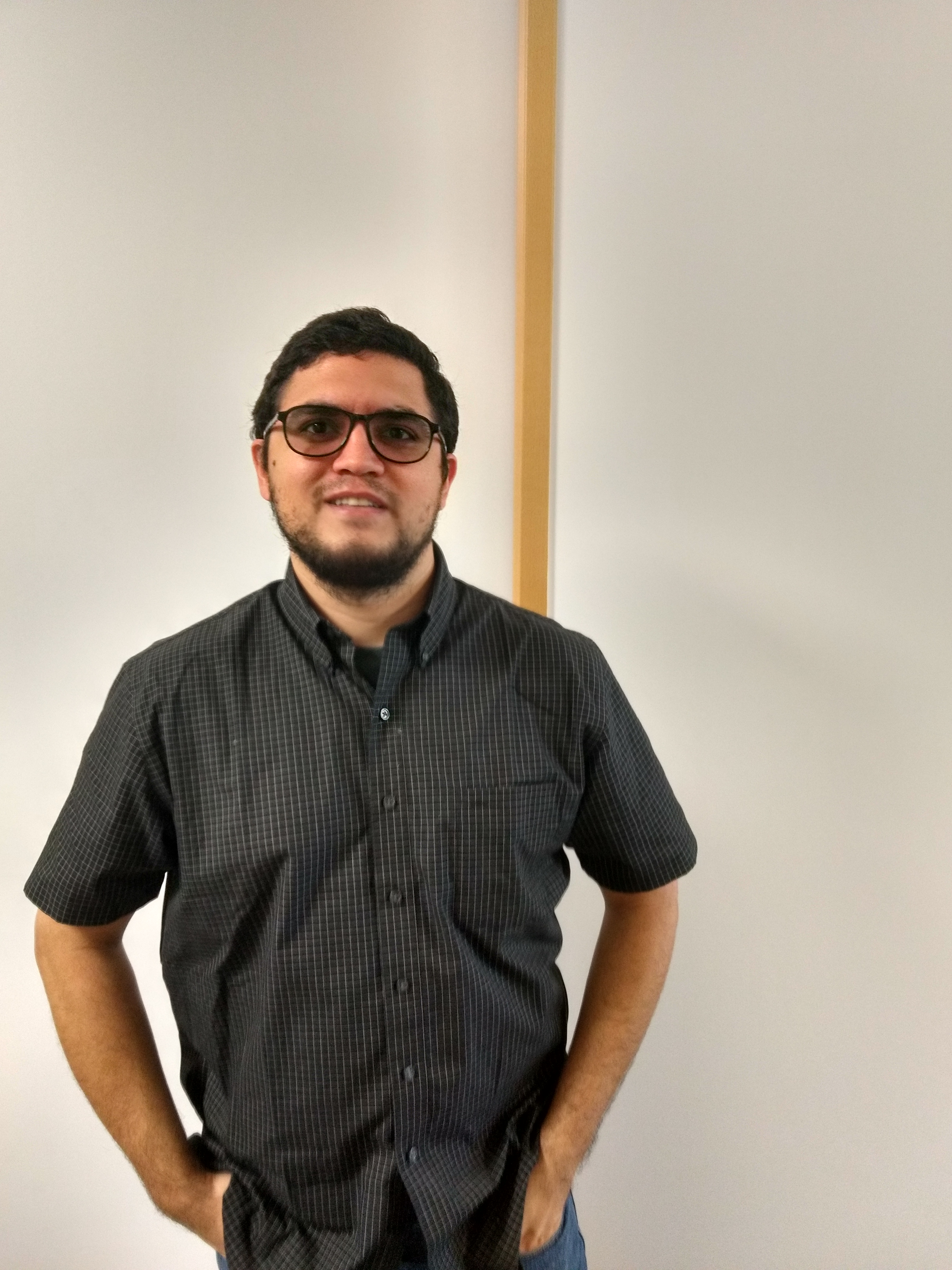
- Born: 15 February 1985 (age 41); Caracas, Venezuela
- Education: Central University of Venezuela
- Occupation: Journalist
- Spouse: Naky Soto

Luis Carlos Díaz Vázquez (born 15 February 1985) is a Venezuelan journalist and cyberactivist. He has worked at the Instituto Radiofónico Fe y Alegría, the Centro Gumilla and newspapers such as El Nacional and Tal Cual, as well as a radio host at Circuito Unión Radio, and served as a member of the editorial board of SIC magazine. Luis Carlos was arbitrarily detained in 2019 by agents of the Bolivarian Intelligence Service (SEBIN) during the nationwide blackouts of that year, being declared by Amnesty International as a prisoner of conscience. He was released the following day with precautionary measures and his case was archived in 2021, suspending such measures.

== Biography ==
He grew up in the city of Charallave, in the Valles del Tuy, and started using the Internet in 1994. With the popularization of the Internet in the 2000s, he came into contact with the world of blogs where he created his blog Periodismo de paz, began studying for a degree in social communication at the Central University of Venezuela and began his career as a journalist. Aligned with the activity of the jesuits and critical of chavismo, he worked, among other media, in the magazine Comunicación and the newspaper El Nacional, as co-producer and announcer of the Instituto Radiofónico Fe y Alegría, as columnist on the political use of information and communication technologies in the newspaper Tal Cual, as coordinator of communication and networks of the Fundación Centro Gumilla and as a member of the editorial board of the magazine SIC. He also participated in the drafting of Versión beta: tendencias de la prensa y el periodismo del siglo XXI en Venezuela, published in 2008, where he talks about the future of the Internet. Since 2010 he was coordinator and presenter of the International Meeting of Peace Builders, held annually. In 2015 he began working at Circuito Unión Radio. with the Circuito Éxitos program, which was cancelled at the beginning of 2019, while Díaz was traveling in Mexico.

=== Detention ===
Between the night of March 11 and the early morning of March 12, 2019 agents of the Bolivarian Intelligence Service (SEBIN), at the service of the government of Nicolás Maduro, detained him, raided and looted his home in Caracas and transferred him to El Helicoide. His wife, Naky Soto, the National Union of Press Workers of Venezuela (SNTP) and the NGO PROVEA denounced the events. Luis Carlos was accused of promoting Venezuela's power blackout that began on 7 March 7 and was ongoing. The agents also threatened Naky with arrest if she made "too much noise" about what had happened. Amnesty International later declared Luis Carlos a prisoner of conscience. Naky would also later denounce that the first SEBIN commission that interviewed him beat him with the helmet of his bicycle, stole all the cash and jewelry they had, told him that they had arrested her at the Military Hospital and that they would take a corpse to his house to accuse them of murder, threatening him several times with her health, as she was suffering from cancer. Naky pressed for her husband's release and called on the United Nations Human Rights Commission in Caracas to inquire about his well-being.

Luz Mely Reyes told The Guardian that the arrest of Luis Carlos Díaz was part of the "war against the press" waged by Nicolás Maduro. Erika Guevara Rosas, Amnesty International's director for the Americas, declared that Luis Carlos Díaz had been detained "for his widely respected work covering the demands of the people of Venezuela to live in dignity" and for "denouncing the authorities' response to the serious human rights crisis" underway, described him as a prisoner of conscience and demanded his immediate and unconditional release. Almost 24 hours after his arrest, the United Nations High Commissioner for Human Rights, Michelle Bachelet, expressed her concern for the journalist and asked for "urgent access" to him.

On the night of 12 March 2019, he was released from prison after a hearing in the Caracas courts, in which, according to the organization Espacio Público, he was charged with the crime of "public instigation" and imposed the obligation to appear in court every eight days and prohibitions to leave the country and to testify before the media about his case. He was not able to return to radio and was prevented from participating in international events as a consultant, speaker and journalist.

On 1 February 2021, his case was filed, suspending the precautionary measures against him.

The case of Luis Carlos Díaz is included in the report of the International Fact-Finding Mission on Venezuela published on 20 September 2022, where he recounted that he was handed over to officials of the General Directorate of Military Counterintelligence (DGCIM) and transferred to a clandestine detention center, where he was subjected to cruel and inhumane treatments, before being transferred to El Helicoide the following day.

== Awards ==
In 2013 Luis Carlos Díaz received the international award The BOBs as the best person to follow on Twitter in Spanish language from Deutsche Welle.

In 2020 he was awarded the Sophie Scholl Prize by the German embassy in Venezuela, an award that "seeks to recognize and accompany institutions or people who, through their commitment and work, contribute to the strengthening of democracy and the values that they support it ", along with Naky Soto.

== Works ==
- Versión beta: tendencias de la prensa y el periodismo del siglo XXI en Venezuela (2008)
- Justicia transicional en medios de comunicación (2022)

== See also ==
- Political prisoners in Venezuela
- Torture in Venezuela
