= La Tumba =

Prison in Caracas, Venezuela

- Caracas, Venezuela
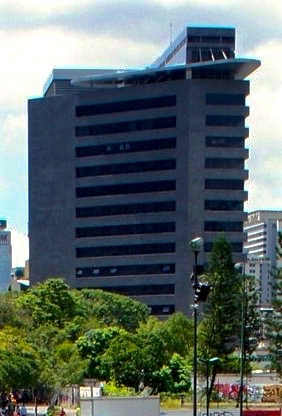
- La Tumba seen from Plaza Venezuela

Site information
- Type: Office building, headquarters
- Owner: Government of Venezuela
- Operator: SEBIN
- Controlled by: Ministry of Interior, Justice and Peace
- Condition: In service

Location
- Coordinates: 10.4954°N 66.8826°W
- Area: 3,689.89 m^{2} (39,717.6 sq ft)
- Height: 16 stories above ground, 5 floors below.

Site history
- Built: 2005
- In use: 2014
- Events: 2014–17 Venezuelan protests

La Tumba (lit. 'The Tomb') is an underground detention facility of a tower in Caracas, Venezuela, that serves as the headquarters for the Bolivarian Intelligence Service (SEBIN). It was initially designed as offices for the Caracas Metro.

== History ==
=== Design and construction ===
The initial project for an office tower and metro station was designed by the Central University of Venezuela's Andres Bello Foundation Fund for Development to serve as the Corporate Tower of the Caracas Metro. In 2003, a plot of land was awarded for the project near Plaza Venezuela, near the geographical center of Caracas where many offices and other important locations are found. In July 2005, construction began on the project with more than $18 million invested into construction.

Plans for the tower included a height of 16 stories as well as having five basement levels. The levels were to include an exit for Zona Rental station where it was the meeting point of major arteries of the Caracas Metro; Lines L1, L3 and L4. The basement levels also had space for approximately 100 parking spaces. The projected finish date was in 2008, though the use of the tower by the Caracas Metro was never realized.

=== SEBIN headquarters ===
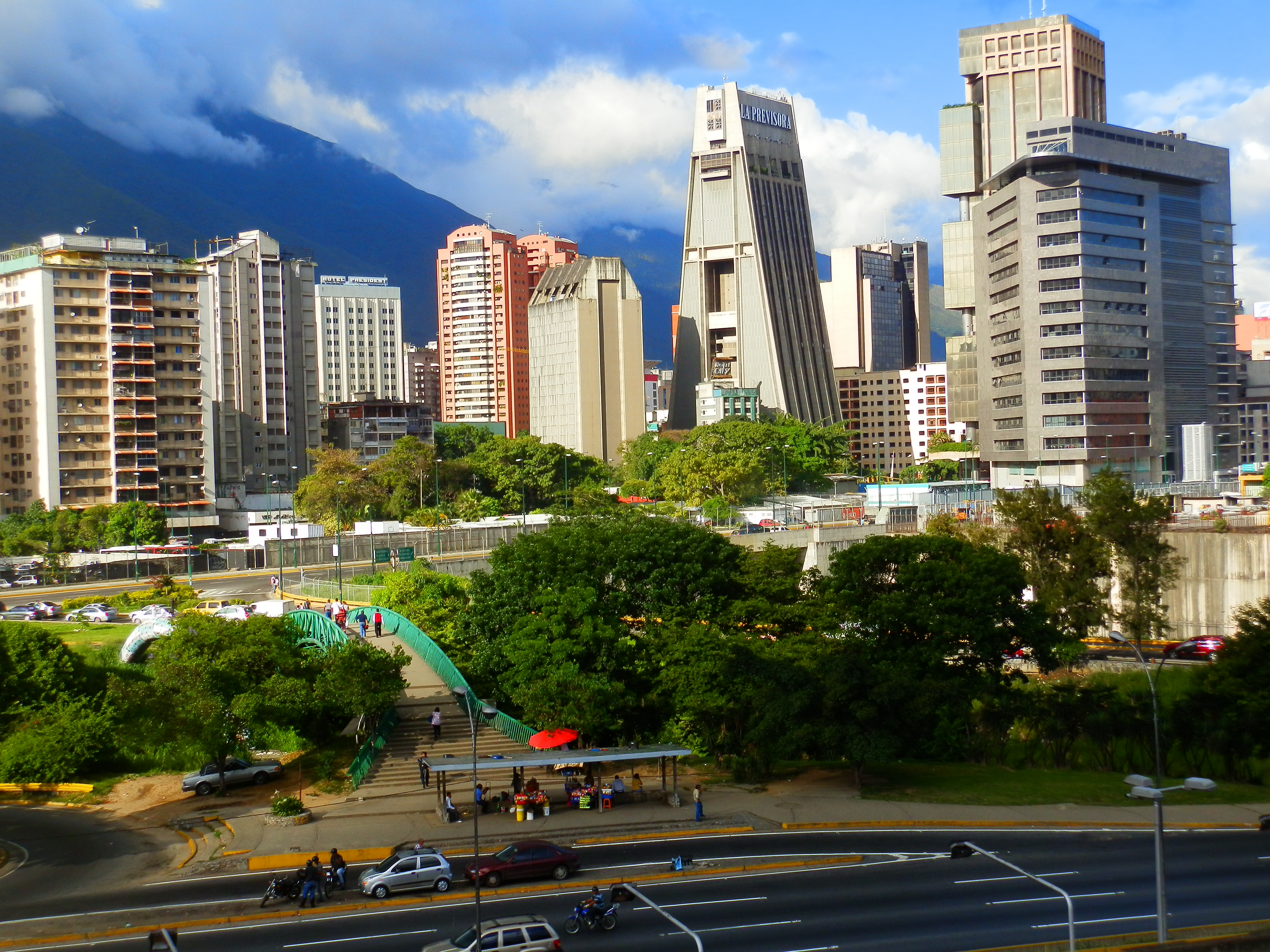
La Tumba seen on the right, located in the center of Caracas among other prominent locations.

The Bolivarian Intelligence Service (SEBIN) eventually made the tower its headquarters following restructuring of the agency in 2013. The detention facility was then dubbed "La Tumba" by Venezuelan government officials since many political prisoners were held there by the government following the Venezuelan protests.

==== Underground detention facility ====
The underground detention facility is located where the underground parking for the Metro Caracas was to be located. The cells are two by three meters that have a cement bed, white walls, security cameras, no windows and barred doors, with each cell aligned next to one another so there are no interactions between prisoners. Such conditions have caused prisoners to become very ill, though they are denied medical treatment. Bright lights in the cells are kept on so prisoners lose their sense of time, with the only sounds heard being from the nearby Caracas Metro trains. Those who visit the prisoners are subjected to strip searches by multiple SEBIN personnel.

Reports of torture in La Tumba, specifically white torture, are also common, with some prisoners attempting to commit suicide. Such conditions according to NGO Justice and Process are to force prisoners to plead guilty to crimes they are accused of.

== See also ==
- El Helicoide
- Enforced disappearances in Venezuela
