= Carlos Andrés García (politician) =

Venezuelan politician

- Born: c. 1973
- Died: 17 September 2017 (aged 43–44); San Cristóbal, Táchira, Venezuela
- Occupation: Politician
- Political party: Justice First

Carlos Andrés García (c. 1973 – 17 September 2017) was a Venezuelan politician who served as councilor of Guasdualito, Apure, and who died while incarcerated by the Bolivarian Intelligence Service (SEBIN).

== Detention and death ==
On 17 December 2016, the Bolivarian Intelligence Service (SEBIN) raided the house of Councilman García and arrested him after several protests were registered in Guasdualito that resulted in at least three bank entities looted and one injured and during negotiations between the opposition and the government. The opposition deputy for the Apure state, Luis Lippa, was also detained "to protect him", violating his parliamentary immunity, being released shortly afterwards. The councilman was arrested allegedly in possession of a sum of money in cash, but the Justice First party assured that the security forces planted a package of bills that supposedly at that time was no longer valid. The authorities considered that the sum of money was suspicious, but Garcia assured that it was a set-up and declared innocence. García remained in custody accused of the crimes of theft, public incitement and arson, without a trial being instituted against him. Justice First also denounced that despite demanding García's release for health reasons, the government "refused and he left him unjustly detained."

In August 2017, García suffered a stroke while he was being held in SEBIN prison. Security officials reportedly systematically refused to give medical attention to García and ignored the orders to allow the councilor to move to a hospital center. Family members reported that the officials did not deliver him the medicines that he had to take by prescription that they had sent him. His sister Yhorlenys Aular also complained that the officials claimed that García was only "pretending" to be ill and that they did not provide him first aid.

Up until 17 August, SEBIN was reported to have refused to transfer him to a healthcare center. However, the following day, he was transferred to the Central Hospital of San Cristóbal, Táchira. Justice First affirmed that García "was only transferred to a health center when there was no possibility of doing anything to improve his health". On 17 September 2017, the councilor's family confirmed his death at the health center. Despite being considered a political prisoner and having received the benefit of house arrest as Leopoldo López and Antonio Ledezma, the order was not executed by the security forces. The government refused to allow an autopsy of the body.

=== Reactions ===
It is the best demonstration of how perverse a government can be and how the life of the Venezuelans can be worth nothing to a government.

— Tomás Guanipa

Justice First stated that Garcia's death was the exclusive responsibility of the government. Fellow councilors stated that they would take García's case to international instances. During a press conference on 18 September, Tomás Guanipa, deputy and secretary general of Justice First, reported that a complaint would be lodged with the Prosecutor's Office, the United Nations High Commissioner for Human Rights, the Inter-American Commission on Human Rights, the Office of the Rapporteur on Arbitrary Detention of the United Nations and the World Health Organization.

The Supreme Tribunal of Justice (TSJ) issued a statement affirming that García entered the Central Hospital of San Cristóbal with a "pathology of arterial hypertension", which received the proper medical attention from his date of admission and was even subjected to "different medical studies showing a pathological result of presumed infectious immunodeficient disease, all of which could have produced complications in the pathology of cerebral toxoplasmosis", which according to the tribunal led to his death. The tribunal also maintained that there were no warnings or requests in García's file about him suffering from a chronic illness and asked the opposition "to refrain from issuing irresponsible opinions with false information and with the sole purpose of causing alarm in the population".

The Secretary General of the Organization of American States (OAS) Luis Almagro and the Venezuelan Attorney General in exile Luisa Ortega Díaz blamed the government for the death of councilman García and described it as another violation of human rights in the country. The metropolitan mayor Antonio Ledezma and the NGO Foro Penal attributed the death to the lack of timely medical attention. Deputy Freddy Guevara and member of the opposition María Corina Machado described the death as a "murder". Baruta councilor and coordinator of the Popular Will party Luis Somaza stated that "The death of Councilman Carlos Andrés García makes it even clearer to the world that in Venezuela there are political prisoners and that their human rights are violated," stating that García was deprived of medical attention when he required it and that was the reason for his death. The governor of Miranda Henrique Capriles extended his condolences to García's family. It was announced that the National Assembly would investigate Garcia's death.

== See also ==
- Political prisoners in Venezuela
- Enforced disappearances in Venezuela
- Fernando Albán Salazar
- Rafael Acosta Arévalo
- Salvador Franco
