= Víctor Navarro =

Venezuelan journalist and activist

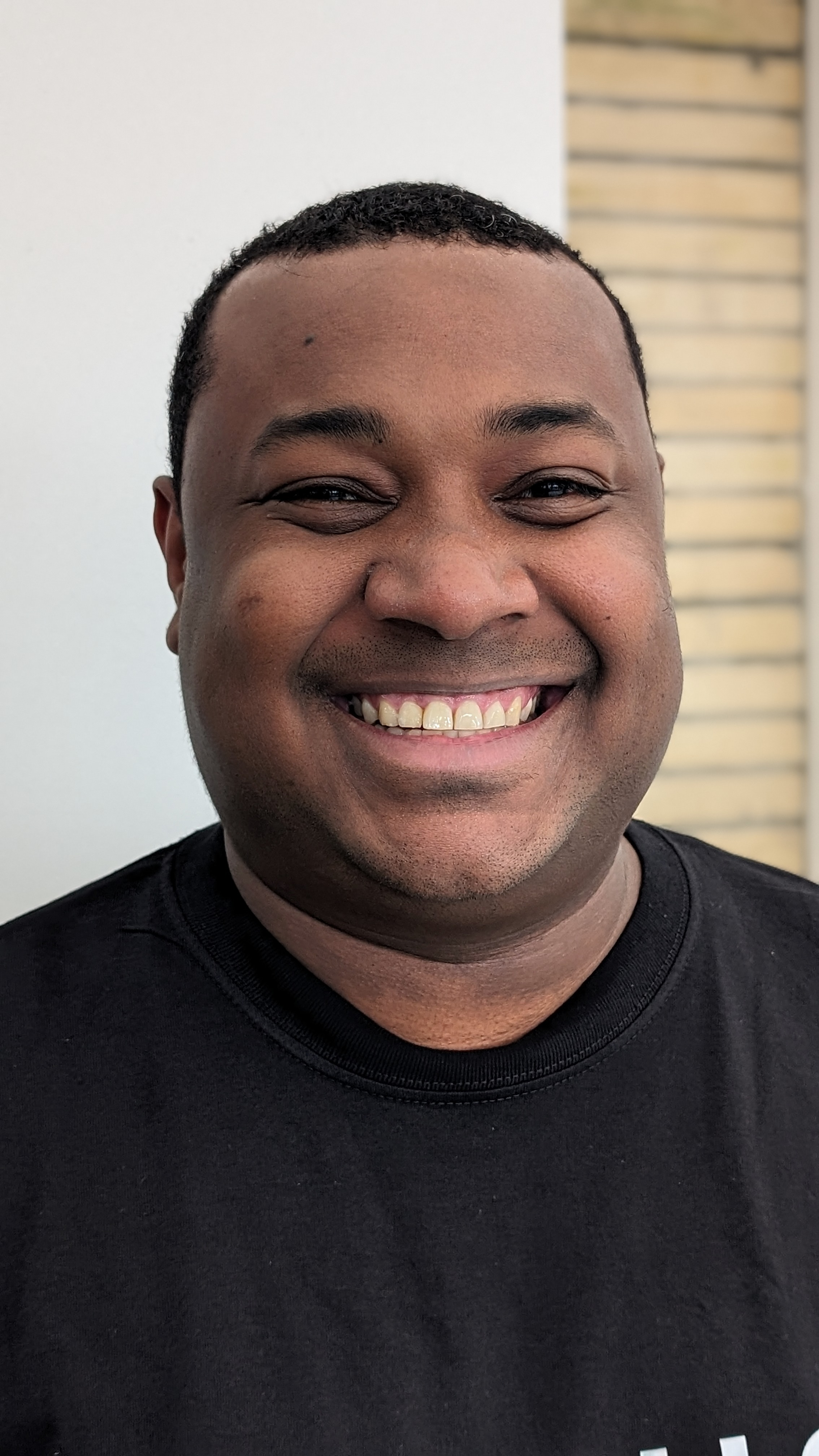
- Victor Navarro in 2024
- Occupation: Journalist
- Known for: Human rights activism
- Notable work: Helicoide, a virtual reality experience

Víctor Navarro is a Venezuelan journalist, human rights activist, and former political prisoner. He now operates a human rights NGO, Voces de la Memoria, and developed a virtual reality experience of the human rights abuses Venezuelan political prisoners face.

== Biography ==
Navarro had worked as a journalist in Caracas while completing his university thesis. Due to his writings critical of the Maduro government, he was arbitrarily detained in 2018 at the age of 22 and held in El Helicoide, Venezuela's clandestine torture facility. He underwent physical and psychological abuse, but was able to secure his release when, under duress, he affirmed Maduro was the legitimate president of Venezuela. He then fled for Argentina where he now lives as an exile.

He is the executive director of Voces de la Memoria, an NGO focused on integrating technology for human rights activism. Most recently, Voces de la Memoria developed Helicoide, a virtual reality experience, which recreates the torturous experience of political prisoner's in El Helicoide.

== See also ==
- Political prisoners in Venezuela
