= Edmundo Rada =

Venezuelan politician (died 2019)

Sucre Municipality Councilman

Personal details
- Died: 17 October 2019 Caracas
- Party: Popular Will

Edmundo Rafael Rada Ángulo, also known as Pipo, (died 16 October 2019) was a Venezuelan politician who served as councilman for the Popular Will party for Petare, in the Sucre Municipality of State Miranda del Distrito of Caracas. Rada, went missing on 16 October 2019 and was found dead The next day, on the edge of one of the roads of Petare Santa Lucía-Urbanización: Guicoco in Petare, burned and with two shots in the back of his neck.

== Career ==
Rada was known as a social leader who spearheaded the organization of community kitchens and the recovery of sports facilities. Through public consultation and with the educational units of the Sucre Municipality, he created the Municipal Flag. He also established the first Children's Municipal Council and created municipal networks and command centers in different sectors. Furthermore, he activated immediate assistance programs in conjunction with the mayor's administration in the five parishes that comprise the municipality, giving voice and participation to the communities and grassroots leaders. He was an active member been a member of Popular Will since the party was founded, according to Leopoldo López.

== Disappearance and death ==
Rada was reported missing on October 16, 2019. His body was found on the next day on the side of the road out of Petare, burned and with two shots in the back of his neck. 2019 Venezuelan president and leader of the Popular Will party Juan Guaidó declared that Rada's death was "a murder [committed by] the dictatorship" (i.e. forces loyal to Maduro) and that "there are clear indications that the cause [was] political," suspecting that the crime was committed by the Special Action Forces (FAES). Guaidó noted that Rada was murdered on the same day that Venezuela was elected as member of the United Nations Human Rights Council. Rada's family gave public statements only to Colombian networks, reporting that Rada had fears of the FAES coming after him after they took photographs of him at a protest in late September.

His funeral was held in "Barrio Unión" de Petare, sector "vuelta del beso" and he is interred at the Caracas East Cemetery The Guarita. His body was identified and recovered from the Bello Monte morgue by his family, son and fellow politicians. On Friday 18 October, the Spanish government condemned the "cruel murder" of a politician.

== See also ==
- Fernando Albán
- Enforced disappearances in Venezuela
- List of solved missing person cases (2000s)
- List of unsolved murders (2000–present)
