= Naky Soto =

Venezuelan writer

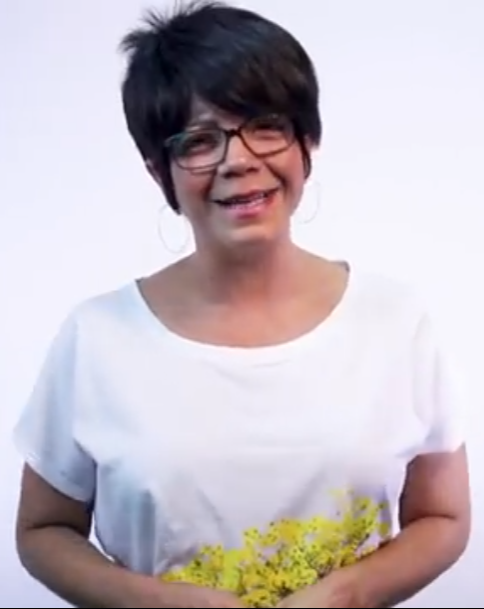
- On YouTube in 2019
- Born: 16 March 1973 (age 53)
- Education: Andrés Bello Catholic University
- Occupation: Writer
- Spouse: Luis Carlos Díaz

Naibet Nakarina Soto Parra (born 16 March 1973) is a Venezuelan writer.

== Biography ==
Naky is an industriologist graduated from the Andrés Bello Catholic University, has worked in the NGO Liderazgo y Visión and has an online journal about current affairs in Venezuela, the blog Zaperoqueando.

Along with her husband, journalist Luis Carlos Díaz, she has hosted and created programs on various Internet platforms. In one of their first projects, "Political Hangouts", they used Google Hangouts to explain the crisis in Venezuela, where the audience participated by sending comments and questions.

On 11 March 2019, Naky denounced the raid of their residence and the arrest of her husband by officials of the Bolivarian Intelligence Service (SEBIN). Naky pressed for the release of Luis Carlos and called on the United Nations Human Rights Commission in Caracas to learn about his well-being. Luis Carlos was released the following night with precautionary measures.

In 2019, the Andrés Bello Catholic University published the book El costurero de lata, a compilation of Naky's chronicles. In 2020 she was awarded the Sophie Scholl Prize by the German embassy in Venezuela, an award that "seeks to recognize and accompany institutions or people who, through their commitment and work, contribute to the strengthening of democracy and the values that they support it ", along with Luis Carlos Díaz.

She has been a contributor to different media and host of the YouTube channel NakyLuisCarlos along with her husband, hosting the program En serio.
