= Fernando Albán =

Venezuelan-Colombian activist, lawyer and politician

Fernando Albán Salazar

Libertador Bolivarian Municipality Councilman
- In office 16 December 2013 – 8 October 2018

Personal details
- Born: Fernando Alberto Albán Salazar; 1 October 1962 Palmira, Valle del Cauca, Colombia
- Died: 8 October 2018 (aged 56) Caracas, Venezuela
- Party: Justice First
- Education: Central University of Venezuela

Fernando Alberto Albán Salazar (Latin American Spanish: [feɾˈnando alˈβeɾto alˈβan salaˈsaɾ], 1 October 1962 – 8 October 2018) was a Venezuelan–Colombian activist, lawyer, politician, and prominent figure within the Justice First opposition party. Albán served as a councilman of the Libertador Municipality of Caracas from 2012 until his death in office in 2018.

He died while he was detained in the headquarters of the Bolivarian Intelligence Service (SEBIN) in Plaza Venezuela, Caracas. Government officials initially reported his death as a suicide, but his friends, family, opposition political parties and Luis Almagro, Secretary General of the Organization of American States, argued that the councilor's death was murder.

In May 2021 Maduro's Attorney General, Tarek William Saab, admitted that Albán did not commit suicide as initially reported, but was killed by two SEBIN officers guarding him.

== Personal life and early career ==
Albán was born in Colombia, and relocated to Venezuela at the age of four. At the time of his death, he held citizenship in both countries. He was a devout Catholic, and had worked with the Archdiocese of Caracas on many charity projects.

Albán, a lawyer who specialized in labor law, received his law degree from Central University of Venezuela. He served as the national secretary of the Justice First trade union association. He was elected to the Capital District's Libertador Bolivarian Municipality council in the 2013 municipal elections, winning the election with 6,170 votes and representing Circuit 3 on the council.

Albán with his wife, Meudy, and their two children, Fernando and María, maintained a residence in New York at the time of his death.

== Arrest ==
Albán traveled to New York City for the 73rd session of the United Nations General Assembly, as part of a Justice First opposition delegation led by Julio Borges. Albán, Borges, and other members of the delegation had meetings with foreign dignitaries and other groups attending the assembly. Albán was detained by Venezuelan authorities at Simón Bolívar International Airport on Friday, 5 October 2018, upon his return to the country. No reason for his arrest was given, and no details were provided of where he was being held, until after his death. The BBC reported that people close to him did not believe the official reason for arrest, instead saying that Albán was arrested for presenting information about human rights violations in Venezuela during the assembly. Albán told his family and lawyers that he was pressured by the Maduro government to testify against Borges about the Caracas drone attack and he refused.

Tarek William Saab, prosecutor general for the Maduro administration, later stated that Albán was arrested because of "evidence of 2,000 chats with conspiratorial themes". The number has also been reported as 200, and the chats were defined as conversations found on Albán's personal mobile phone.

== Death ==
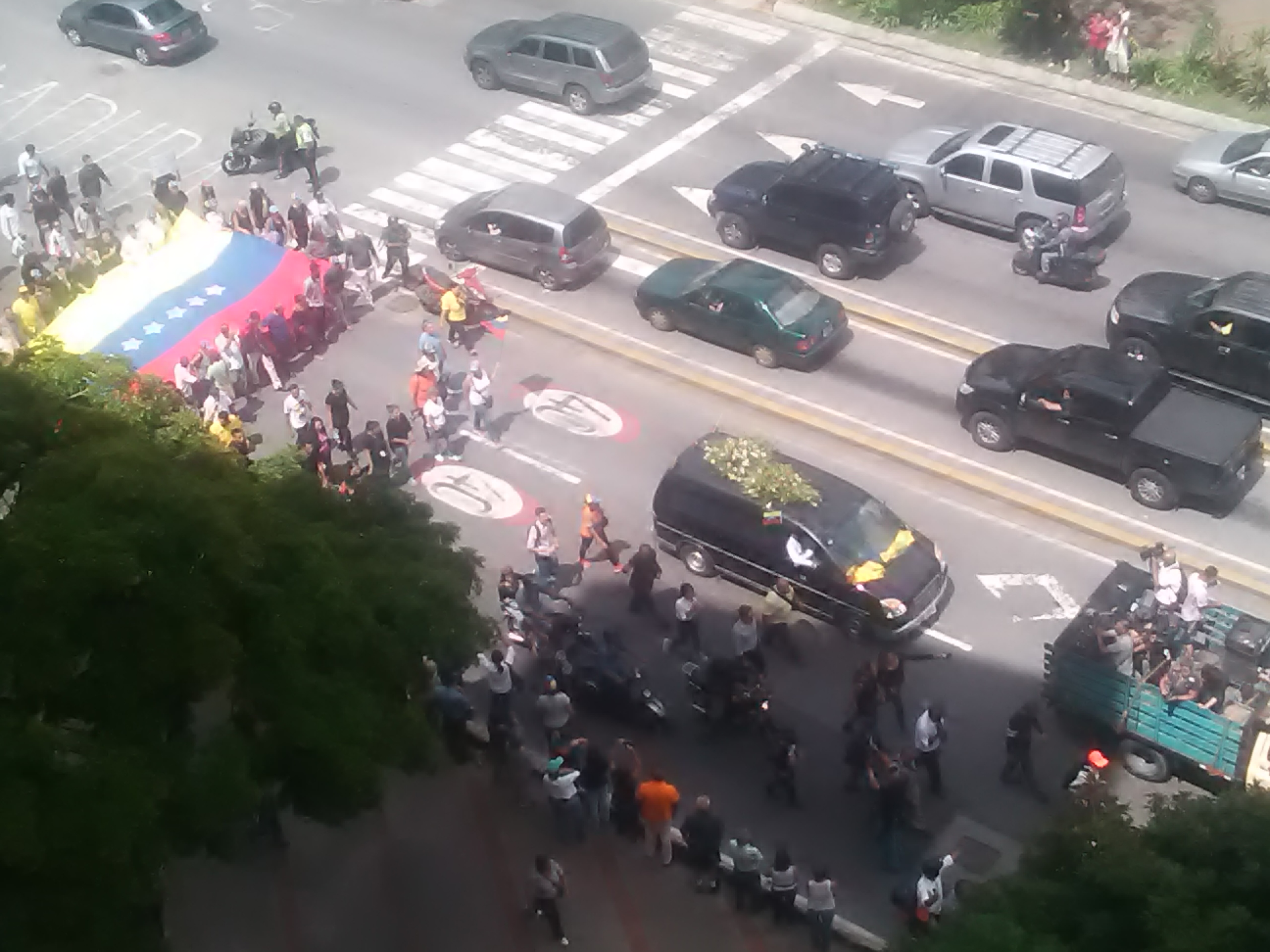
Albán's hearse and funeral procession

Albán was taken into SEBIN custody after his arrest, and was said after his death to be a suspect for the Caracas drone attack that had occurred two months earlier. He was seen by lawyer Joel García on Sunday after his arrest on Friday, but was reported dead on Monday, 8 October, 2018. The government states that he died by suicide when he jumped from a tenth-floor window either whilst he was waiting to be transferred (Interior Minister Néstor Reverol's account) or whilst going to the bathroom (Saab's account) at around midday. According to anonymous sources that Julio Borges says are official, Albán was dead before he was thrown out of a window. According to William Jiménez, former coordinator of national investigations of the Caracas morgue, the autopsy revealed that water was found in Albán's lungs and Néstor Reverol ordered the report to be edited.

The narrative provided by the Maduro government was widely disputed. Efecto Cocuyo noted the differences in official stories, and quoted former SEBIN prisoners explaining that detainees are always escorted to the bathroom, opening further doubts, as the bathroom version was the first explanation given. Lawyers who knew the building confirmed that there are no windows in the bathroom and that all of the windows are locked, so Albán could not have opened one himself. His death, called murder by many, prompted protests across Venezuela and received worldwide media attention.

A memorial was held at the National Assembly building the day after his death; his body was immediately released, but contained within a flag-draped coffin. He was buried on Wednesday, 10 October. His family watched his funeral on video from their residence in New York. His devout Catholic faith is cited by friends, colleagues, and the conference of Catholic bishops of Venezuela as a reason to not believe the official story regarding his death, because he had too much respect for God to consider taking his own life.

=== Reactions ===
With his body concealed, the public became concerned that Albán had been tortured, which was supported by allegations from the Venezuelan opposition government, including Borges directly. A demonstration was held outside the city mortuary for the release of his body, with fears he would be cremated before anyone could examine it. The United Nations suggested that the Venezuelan government and intelligence service can be held responsible regardless of how Albán died, as officials are "obligated to ensure Albán's safety while in their custody". Article 44 of the Constitution of Venezuela says that the State is responsible for protecting the lives of its prisoners.

Venezuelan opposition deputy Juan Miguel Matheus gave a speech describing the torture of Albán, saying that he would have been electrocuted and asphyxiated. Luisa Ortega Díaz – the exiled Venezuelan Attorney General – announced her understanding that Albán died of suffocation while being tortured by a bag over his head during interrogation. The United States has also said it believes Albán was tortured then killed. France called for an investigation into the "suspicious" death and summoned the Venezuelan ambassador to the Ministry of Europe and Foreign Affairs on Thursday, 11 October. Spain took similar actions, questioning the Venezuelan ambassador in Madrid. Multiple foreign countries suggested that the Maduro government tortured Albán. Saab denied all claims of torture, calling them a "rotten lie".

Candlelight protests, public memorials and vigils were held in Caracas, particularly outside the SEBIN buildings, to denounce the murder. Supporters marched in Albán's funeral procession, with some holding signs with the slogan Yo me niego a rendirme (I refuse to give up), recalling the last speech of Juan Requesens before his detention.

The United States Department of State issued a statement in April 2019 highlighting Albán's death as an example of the Maduro administration human rights abuses, stating:

In October 2018, Caracas Councilman Fernando Alban traveled to New York to denounce the Maduro regime's brutality on the sidelines of the United Nations General Assembly. Upon his return to Venezuela on October 5, Maduro's secret police arrested him at the airport. He died in custody a few days later when he mysteriously fell from a 10th floor window of a maximum-security prison in Caracas.

=== Investigations ===
The office of the United Nations High Commissioner for Human Rights called for an investigation into Albán's death, and planned to include it in a wider investigation into human rights abuses in the country. The European Union also asked for an independent investigation. Tarek William Saab, Venezuelan prosecutor general, said that he would investigate the death, but classified it as a suicide. García pointed out in response that a death can not be classified as suicide without an autopsy and investigation, and requested to be present at the autopsy. García was not present at the secret autopsy supposedly performed shortly before burial; Saab announced that the autopsy found that Albán died of blunt force trauma. It was later reported that there were two different death certificates, the first issued by a community doctor without the credentials to do so, and the other by a supposed doctor using a stolen identity.

The opposition government in Venezuela asked that Colombia perform the investigation, so that it would be unbiased. García suggested that since Albán retained his Colombian citizenship after moving to Venezuela, Colombia could have more legal rights to pursue an investigation; the international ramifications of the event were heightened when Albán's place of birth and heritage (his parents and ancestors are all Colombian) were made public knowledge.

In May 2021, Maduro's Attorney General, Tarek William Saab, admitted that Albán did not commit suicide, as initially reported by government officials, but was killed. Saab announced that two SEBIN officers had arrest warrants issued against them for manslaughter and other related charges.

On 16 December 2021 the two SEBIN officers were sentenced to 5 years and 10 months imprisonment for the "escape" and death of Fernando Albán. The sentence was criticized for its brevity and for not indicting those politically involved. In February 2022 a decision by the Court of Appeals of Caracas further reduced their sentence to two years and eight months. Zair Mundaray, former prosecutor of the Venezuelan Public Ministry, denounced that the officers "were always in the offices of the SEBIN in El Helicoide" and they never "set foot in a jail". Albán's family lawyer declared that the officers were only imprisoned for a few days and that they were charged for a crime of negligence, but never convicted for an intentional homicide, as if an accident had occurred.

== See also ==
- Political prisoners in Venezuela
- Enforced disappearances in Venezuela
- List of unsolved murders (2000–present)
- Edmundo Rada
- Rafael Acosta Arévalo
- Salvador Franco
- Torture in Venezuela
