= Rafael Acosta Arévalo =

Venezuelan military officer (1969–2019)

- Born: Rafael Ramón Acosta Arévalo; 16 June 1969; Maracay, Aragua, Venezuela
- Died: 29 June 2019 (aged 50); Caracas, Venezuela
- Education: Military Academy of the Bolivarian Navy
- Occupation: Military officer
- Spouse: Walewska Pérez
- Children: 2

Rafael Ramón Acosta Arévalo (16 June 1969 – 29 June 2019) was a Venezuelan military officer with the rank of corvette captain of the Venezuela Navy. Acosta Arévalo was victim of forced disappearance and tortured by agents of the General Directorate of Military Counterintelligence (DGCIM) during his detention after being accused by the government of Nicolás Maduro of "conspiring to carry out an attempted coup d'état". Acosta Arévalo died as a result of injuries suffered after being tortured while in detention in the Military Hospital of the Army Dr. Vicente Salias Sanoja. The news of his death caused great impact in the media and the condemnation of both national and international authorities.

== Personal life ==
Acosta Arévalo resided in Maracay. He graduated from the Military Academy of the Bolivarian Navy, where he obtained his rank of ensign in the component of the Bolivarian Navy, of the National Bolivarian Armed Forces. He was married to Walewska Pérez and was the father of two children.

== Death ==
=== Detention and torture ===
On 22 June 2019, Acosta Arévalo's wife denounced his disappearance and stated that she had spoken with him for the last time at 2:00 p.m. of the previous day, while he was in a "personal meeting" in Guatire, Miranda.

On that day, officials from the General Directorate of Military Counterintelligence (DGCIM) and the Bolivarian Intelligence Service (SEBIN) detained seven people, including active and retired military and police officers. Among the detainees were two retired colonels, a brigadier general of the aviation, a lieutenant colonel of the Army, two retired commissaries of the Scientific, Penal and Criminal Investigation Corps (CICPC) and a corvette captain of the Navy, Acosta Arévalo. On 26 July, after six days without knowing his whereabouts, Acosta Arévalo's arrest was announced by Minister for Communication and Information Jorge Rodríguez, who accused three of them, including Captain Acosta Arévalo, of committing "the crimes of terrorism, conspiracy and treason". According to the government, the accused were preparing a coup that "included the death of Nicolás Maduro and Diosdado Cabello."

During his detention, Cabello assured that the captain was "under safeguard".

On 28 June, Acosta Arévalo was transferred by a DGCIM commission to the headquarters of the military court to hold his presentation hearing, where he arrived in a wheelchair with serious indications of torture. DGCIM officials prevented Acosta Arévalo's interview with his lawyers from being private. Acosta Arévalo presented many excoriations in the arms, little sensitivity in the hands, extreme inflammation in the feet, traces of blood in the nails, and injuries in the torso. Acosta Arévalo was also unable to move his hands or feet, to get up or to speak, with the exception of accepting the appointment of his defender and asking his lawyer for help.

The judge ordered that Acosta Arévalo be transferred to the Army Military Hospital Dr. Vicente Salias Sanoja, located in Fort Tiuna in Caracas, upon observing his critical physical condition and his presentation hearing was postponed. Later, the judge of the case reported that Acosta Arévalo had died at night in the hospital.

After news of Acosta Arévalo's death and the circumstances surrounding it were made public, it was reported that users could not enter the page of the "DGCIM" hashtag on Twitter, reportedly having been blocked.

=== Investigations ===
The government of Nicolás Maduro did not provide a cause of death but announced an investigation on the matter. The Maduro government issued statements following the death of Acosta Arévalo with different contradictions. Jorge Rodríguez announced that Acosta Arévalo's death occurred "during the presentation ceremony in front of the competent court". The attorney general appointed by the Maduro-aligned Constituent National Assembly, Tarek William Saab, said that Acosta Arévalo "was being brought before the court" when he lost consciousness, and Defense Minister Vladimir Padrino López said Acosta Arévalo fainted before the hearing began. Diosdado Cabello dismissed the possibility of an independent investigation, expressing "we trust in our justice", calling the Public Ministry to begin an investigation and mentioning that "whoever has responsibility in the case must assume it".

According to the president of the NGO Control Ciudadano, Rocío San Miguel, "Captain Acosta Arévalo died innocent, since never since his arrest was he formally charged by the Venezuelan state, who violated the most basic constitutional guarantees of due process."

The attorney general in exile, Luisa Ortega Díaz, issued a statement in which she states that she appointed a multidisciplinary team to clarify the death, to determine the responsibility of the authors and impose the corresponding sanctions. According to exiled former prosecutor Zair Mundaray, who said he had been briefed on the autopsy findings by members of the judiciary with access to the report, Acosta had sixteen fractured ribs, eight on each side, fracture of the nasal septum, excoriations in shoulders, elbows, and knees, hematomas in the inner thigh and both extremities, whip-like injuries in the back and thighs, a fractured foot, multiple abrasions and signs of small burns in both feet which suggested that electric shocks had been used.

According to the preliminary autopsy report, the cause of death was severe cerebral edema due to acute respiratory failure, leading to pulmonary thromboembolism, the product of rhabdomyolysis due to widespread polytrauma — lack of brain function after multiple physical injuries.

The Public Prosecutor's Office charged two officials assigned to the Directorate General of Military Intelligence (DGCIM), Lieutenant Ascanio Antonio Tarascio and Sergeant Estiben Zarate, and requested their preventive detention as suspects. The officers were charged with the crime of "pre-intentional concausal homicide", which has a maximum penalty of nine years in prison. Gonzalo Himiob, vice-president of Foro Penal, denounced that a pre-intentional concausal homicide supposes that the death of the person was caused by executing intentional acts with the intention of injuring them, not killing them, and that defining as a common crime any act that is a serious violation to the human rights is a "strategy aimed at distorting the truth and seeking impunity for those responsible" and to qualify homicide as "concausal" implies that the death would not have taken place without the presence of pre-existing or unexpected conditions or situations unknown by the murderer, or unforeseen events, which would have not depended on their actions. Former ombudswoman Gabriela Ramírez regretted that the country's Law against Torture was not applied and that the plan developed in her administration was discarded, of which she blamed her successor, Tarek William Saab.

=== Controlled burial ===
Acosta Arévalo's corpse spent twelve days in the Bello Monte Morgue guarded by the police and later buried in the Eastern Cemetery, in Caracas. The Bolivarian National Police closed the access to the cemetery and the authorities conducted a controlled burial similar to that of Óscar Pérez, in a sealed coffin and against the will of his relatives, whose will is for his remains to be buried in Maracay, Aragua, where most of the family resides.

The same day, security officers raided the residence of Arévalo's parents-in-law in Maracay.

=== Reactions ===
The European Union called for a "complete and independent" investigation into the death of Acosta Arévalo, considering that the case highlights "the arbitrary nature of the judicial system and the lack of guarantees and rights" for detainees in Venezuela. The Lima Group, made up of 14 countries in the Americas, repudiated the captain's death in a statement, calling it a "murder". The secretary general of the Organization of American States, Luis Almagro, demanded "truth and justice for the murder" of Acosta Arévalo, and directly blamed "the dictatorship."

The United States considered the case as "a grim example" of "how far it goes the persecution against Maduro's adversaries." Germany declared that the death of Acosta Arévalo "is an obstacle to a negotiated solution in Venezuela". France condemned Acosta Arévalo's death and called for an "independent investigation" to clarify the circumstances in which it occurred. In Colombia, President Iván Duque strongly rejected the death of the captain, declaring that "the world must put an end to that dictatorship". The Spanish Minister of Foreign Affairs, Josep Borrell, mentioned after what happened with the death of Acosta Arévalo, that "something happened and we want to know." He also asked for a clear investigation on the matter. The Mexican Secretary of Foreign Affairs expressed concern about the death of Acosta Arévalo.

Acosta Arévalo's wife, Venezuelan human rights advocates, Juan Guaidó and the US Department of State accused Maduro's government of torturing the captain to death. A statement from the internal policy committee of the National Assembly reported that the legislative body would request the International Criminal Court and the United Nations to investigate the death of the captain. Guaidó, President of the National Assembly and disputed interim President of Venezuela, described the event as "abominable" and declared that immediate contact was established with the family and the United Nations commission, which instructed both the appointed ambassadors and representatives abroad to file a complaint with foreign governments and the United Nations High Commissioner for Human Rights, Michelle Bachelet, and that information would continue to be collected on Acosta Arévalo's death.

Deputy Delsa Solórzano sent a statement to Bachelet demanding compliance with the Minnesota Protocol, a model procedure recommended by the United Nations High Commissioner for Human Rights to investigate crimes against humanity, in the case that illegal executions were committed, and which is aimed at preventing state officials suspected of having committed the crimes from acting or influencing the investigation. Opposition leaders such as Julio Borges and Antonio Ledezma also condemned the death.

Due to the death of the captain, the delegation of Guaidó in negotiations with the Maduro government suspended their trip to the third round of talks. On 2 July 2019, Acosta Arévalo was posthumously promoted to frigate captain by Guaidó in representation of the National Assembly.

The NGO PROVEA asked the technical team in Venezuela of Bachelet that Maduro give an explanation for the death of Acosta Arévalo. The Comité de Familiares de las Víctimas (COFAVIC, "Committee of Relatives of Victims") issued a statement expressing its deep concern over the death of Acosta Arévalo, arguing that "torture is designed with the deliberate purpose of frighten".

Days later, the head of the Armed Forces high command, Remigio Ceballos, assured that the captain "died while in custody" and that he had conspired against the state for more than ten years. However, the official mentioned that "the entire FANB regrets the events related to the loss of the retired officer".

On 30 June, a floral wreath with the message "We join the pain of the Armed Forces: We demand justice" was left outside the General Command of the Navy, in Caracas. The wreath and other floral offerings were rejected and kicked by military men who guarded the command.

== See also ==
- Political prisoners in Venezuela
- Enforced disappearances in Venezuela
- Torture in Venezuela
- Carlos Andrés García
- Fernando Albán Salazar
- Salvador Franco
