= Víctor Venegas =

Venezuelan union leader and teacher

- Born: c. 1966
- Occupations: trade unionist, educator

Víctor Venegas (c. 1966) is a Venezuelan trade unionist and educator that has served as the president of the National Federation of Unions and Workers' Colleges of Venezuela (FENATEV) in Barinas and basic education professor. He was detained by the Venezuelan government for suspected crimes on 17 January 2024 and released on 11 March 2024. Human rights organisations condemned his imprisonment and have demanded his immediate release.

== Career ==
Venegas is a lawyer and has a masters in education sciences. He has dedicated at least 29 years of his career to basic education, currently being professor in the Ramón Reinoso Núñez School, in addition to serving as president of FENATEV in Barinas.

== Imprisonment ==
On 17 January 2024, while the education sector held an assembly, he was detained in Barinas by a mixed commission of security officials, through orders of Bolivarian Intelligence Service (SEBIN) and the Bolivarian National Police At the moment of arrest, Venegas was presiding over an ordinary meeting of the Federation in order to analyse the salary table. The officers raided the headquarters without identification or showing a warrant. The operation caused damages in the Federation's offices and resulted in two wounded professors: Silvia Martínez and Flavia Franco.

Non-governmental organisations, such as the Human Rights Coalition, condemned the imprisonment of Venegas and demanded his immediate release.

== Personal life ==
Venegas is married to Iris Ángel Dávila, also a professor, with whom he has two daughters. Both daughters graduated as surgeons from Universidad Francisco de Miranda, in Falcón state.

== See also ==
- Political prisoners in Venezuela
