= Carlos Andrés García =

Carlos Andrés García may refer to:

- Carlos García (footballer, born 1979), Uruguayan footballer
- Carlos Andrés García (politician), Venezuelan politician
