= Salvador Franco =

Venezuelan Pemon political prisoner (died 2021)

- Born: c. 1977
- Died: 3 January 2021; El Rodeo II prison, Venezuela
- Citizenship: Venezuelan

Salvador Franco (c. 1977 – 3 January 2021) was a Venezuelan Pemon political prisoner. Franco was detained in December 2019 accused of having participated on the 22 December in a barracks assault in Bolívar state, dying afterwards due to lack of medical attention.

== Detention and death ==
Franco was detained in December 2019 accused of having participated on the 22 December in a barracks assault in Bolívar state. He died on 3 January 2021 due to a lack of medical attention. The indigenous people national coordinator of the NGO Foro Penal declared that Franco had COVID-19 and that for months suffered from gastrointestinal diseases related to the insalubrity of his penitentiary center, informing that he lost a large amount of weight in his last months of life. There was a court order for his transfer to a health center since 21 November 2020, but ultimately it was ignored. The Organization of American States Secretary General, Luis Almagro, condemned Franco's death, naming it as "another crime of the dictatorship" and gave his condolences to his relatives and friends.

An autopsy concluded that Franco died of tuberculosis and malnourishment.

== See also ==
- Political prisoners in Venezuela
- Carlos Andrés García
- Rafael Acosta Arévalo
- Fernando Albán Salazar
- Pemon conflict
