= Phelps Tower =

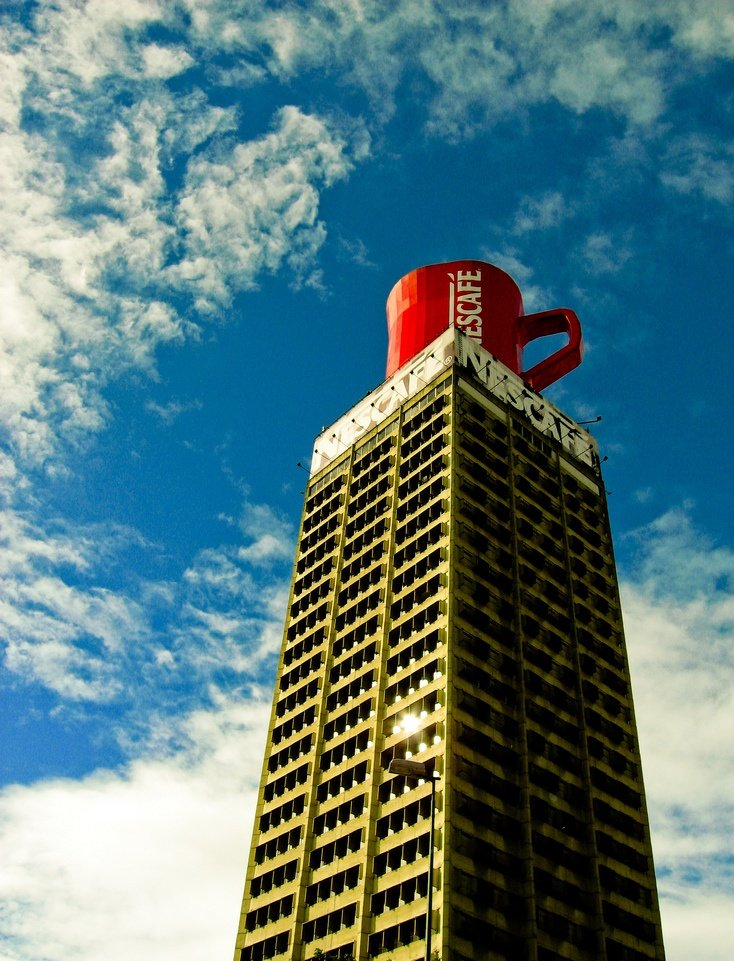
- Phelps Tower in 2009
- Interactive map of the Phelps Tower area

General information
- Status: Completed
- Type: Office
- Location: Caracas, Venezuela
- Coordinates: 10.4978°N 66.8854°W
- Construction started: 1965
- Completed: 1968; 58 years ago

The Phelps Tower (Spanish: Torre Phelps, previously also known as Phillips Tower and Nescafé Tower) is an office building located in the Los Caobos urbanization and the Plaza Venezuela sector, in Caracas, Venezuela.

It is one of the emblematic buildings of the Los Caobos Urbanization, around the central Plaza Venezuela. Its construction began in 1965 and ended in 1968. It has 30 floors and is 100 meters high.

The tower stands out for having had some illuminated advertisements on its roof. At the beginning of the 1980s, its first illuminated sign was installed with the inscription Phillips (to advertise the famous appliance brand), which was initially orange and later became blue. In 1994, it was replaced by the Marlboro cigarette cup and in 2004, this was changed and a huge Nescafé brand cup was installed, which had to be removed in 2010, due to its large size and heavy weight, authorities confirmed. that the famous cup was unstable and there was a risk of it falling due to an earthquake or other type of accident.

On July 15, 2008, the skyscraper suffered a massive fire in the basement due to an electrical fault, with no casualties.

It should not be confused with the Phelps Building located on Av. Urdaneta between the corners of Veroes and Ibarras in the center of Caracas.

In 2021, the Redvital notice was installed.
