= Vicencio Scarano Spisso =

Venezuelan politician

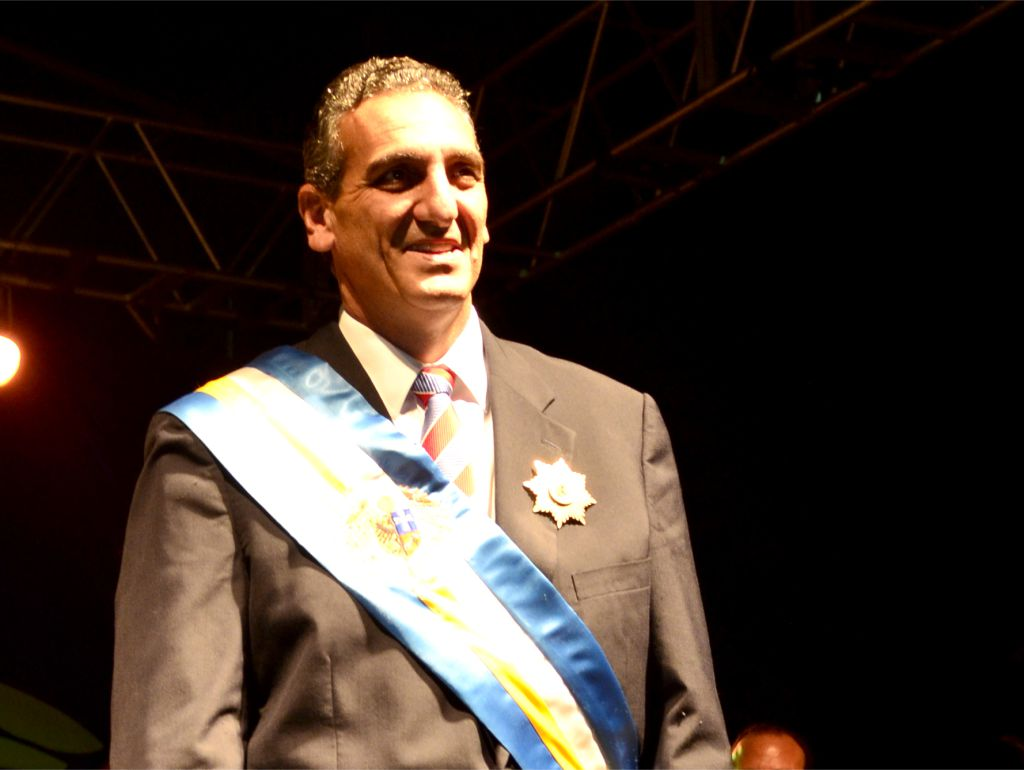
EnzoScarano

Vicencio (Enzo) Scarano Spisso (born 1963) is a Venezuelan politician and entrepreneur.

== Career ==
He was elected as mayor of the San Diego Municipality in 2004 with 33.09% of the votes. In 2008 he was re-elected with 71.08% of the votes. He was re-elected with 75.24% of the votes in 2013.

Scarano accused the national government during February's demonstrations of excessive use of force against demonstrators. On 19 March 2014 the Supreme Court tried him and sentenced him to jail for ten and a half months for failing to comply with a court order to take down barricades in his municipality.

Scarano is the leader of the Cuentas Claras party, currently annexed to Mesa de la Unidad Democratica, the main opposition coalition of political parties in Venezuela.

== See also ==
- Political prisoners in Venezuela
