= Livia Acosta Noguera =

Venezuelan diplomat

- Education: International relations, Theology
- Employer: Government of Venezuela
- Organization: SEBIN

Livia Acosta Noguera was a Venezuelan diplomat to the United States in Miami and is a lead member of SEBIN. She was declared persona non grata by the United States Department of State following an inquiry by the FBI of allegations of planning cyberattacks on government facilities and nuclear power plants in the United States.

== Biography ==
Before the presidency of Hugo Chávez, Acosta worked at the Baptist Seminary of Venezuela. In 2000, she became the head of Special Projects Microfinance Development Fund, focusing on the promotion of microcredit for the underprivileged. In 2001 and 2002 Acosta helped organize the Bolivarian Circles that were used to promote Chavez's ideology in Venezuela and internationally. In 2003, she began working at the embassy in Dominican Republic until 2006. In 2007 she became the second secretary at the embassy in Mexico in charge of cultural affairs, working for cultural and political advocacy and created relationships with groups such as the Mexican leftist party, Democratic Revolution. In 2010, Acosta moved to the embassy in Peru until March 2011, when she was appointed as consul of Venezuela in Miami.

== Cyber attack allegations ==
According to a Univision investigative report titled The Iranian Threat, while Acosta was a cultural attaché in Mexico, she allegedly met with Mexican hackers who were planning to launch cyberattacks on the White House, the FBI, The Pentagon and several nuclear plants. In 2008, Acosta associated with activists and leaders from the embassies of Cuba and Iran in Mexico, and with the group of students and professors at the National Autonomous University of Mexico (UNAM). The plan was discovered after students at UNAM, posing as hackers, reported on a leftist teacher that encouraged the students to commit acts of sabotage and recorded conversations with diplomats after deciding not to carry out sabotage. In one of the recorded conversations, Acosta asked hackers for access to computer system of nuclear plants in the United States and stated that she would give the information to Hugo Chávez. Acosta also asked the supposed hackers to monitor banking operations, property and transport of critics of the Venezuelan government and additional monitoring of Venezuelan military personnel in Mexico.

Following the Univision report, members of the United States congress wrote a letter to the Department of State to investigate the allegation and if they were found to be true, they told them to "declare her a persona non grata and require her immediate departure from the United States". The Department of State called the report "very disturbing" and the FBI began an investigation. Following the investigation, the FBI delivered an inquiry to the Department of State which led to Acosta being declared persona non grata.
