= Milagros Mata Gil =

Venezuelan novelist and essayist

- Born: 17 April 1951; Caracas, Venezuela
- Died: 7 July 2023; El Tigre, Venezuela
- Occupation(s): Novelist, essayist

Milagros Mata Gil (17 April 1951-7 July 2023) was a Venezuelan novelist and essayist. She was a professor of Spanish, literature and Latin at the Instituto Pedagógico de Caracas. She was also a researcher in the area of Venezuelan literature and was a member of the Venezuelan Academy of the Spanish Language since 2011 until her death. She is known, in principle, for her novels and essays, as well as for being the author of the anthem of the Heres Municipality, Bolívar state.

== Arrest ==
On 31 March 2021, Milagros Mata Gil and poet Juan Manuel Muñoz, known as Moriche, were detained by a commission of the Special Action Forces (FAES), reportedly for the publication of the text entitled "Fiesta Mortal" (Deadly Party), referring to a wedding which Attorney General Tarek William Saab attended despite the restrictions due to the coronavirus pandemic. The writer denounced on Twitter that they would be detained until the following day and that they would be charged with "incitement to hatred". Lawyer Gonzalo Himiob, from the NGO Foro Penal, stated that both Mata and Muñoz could not be held in any penitentiary center due to their age, and that in any case they would be subject to precautionary measures or house arrest.

== Works ==
=== Essay books ===
- Héroes y tumbas en Armas Alfonzo
- La Cuenca del Unare según Alfredo Armas Alfonzo
- La rebelión de las ficciones
- El pregón mercadero (relaciones entre crítica literaria y mercado editorial en América Latina)
- Ensayos diversos, Sobre una ciudad campamento (In Loco Remoto)
- Una reflexión sobre el espacio en la novela venezolana
- Los signos de la trama
- El Orinoco es una identidad; Balza: el cuerpo fluvial
- Tiempo y muerte en Alfredo Armas Alfonzo y José Balza
- Elipse sobre una ciudad sin nombres

=== Novels ===
- La casa en llamas (1986)
- Memorias de una antigua primavera (1989)
- Mata El Caracol (1990)
- El diario íntimo de Francisca Malabar (1992)
- El caso del Pastor Acosado (2019)

== Awards ==
Awards given to Milagros include:

- 1986 - Fernando Pessoa Award
- 1986 - Casa de Cultura de Maracay Award
- 1987 - Fundarte Narrative Award
- 1988 - Miguel Otero Silva Editorial Planeta Award
- 1988 - Juan Rulfo Story Award
- 1988 - Internacional Novedades- Diana MéxicoAward
- 1995 - III Bienal de la Literatura Mariano Picón Salas Novel Award

== See also ==
- Political prisoners in Venezuela
