= Enforced disappearances in Venezuela =

Human rights violations in Venezuela

Enforced disappearances in Venezuela have been characterized by being of short duration, occurring mainly during the administration of Nicolás Maduro. In 2018, there were at least 200 cases of enforced disappearances, and in 2019 at least 524 cases, with an average duration of five days. According to Foro Penal and Robert F. Kennedy Human Rights, the short duration of the disappearances have been intended to avoid the scrutiny that could come with large-scale and long-term detentions. A 2019 report by the Office of the United Nations High Commissioner for Human Rights concluded that enforced disappearances had been used In Venezuela as a method by the government to censor opponents and instill fear. The Venezuelan constitution prohibits enforced disappearance, even in states of emergency.

In some cases, missing persons have died in custody shortly after their detentions. For example, in 2018 no information was provided about the place of confinement or reasons for the arrest of opposition councilman Fernando Albán until after his death in custody, three days after his arrest, and in 2019 corvette captain Rafael Acosta Arévalo died in a military hospital, with visible signs of torture, after having been missing.

Although in most cases the disappearances have been of short duration, there are cases of disappearances in Venezuela that have been ongoing for years. The whereabouts of diver Hugo Marino and activist Alcedo Mora, who have been missing for more than four and eight years respectively, are currently unknown. Although their detention by security forces is suspected, by 2023 neither the detention nor the place of confinement of any of them had been confirmed.

== Definition ==
Under international law, an enforced disappearance is defined as a detention of two days or more which, unlike an ordinary detention, includes the denial by the State of any information on the whereabouts of a person.

Article 45 of the Venezuelan Constitution prohibits "the public authority, whether civil or military, even in a state of emergency, exception or restriction of guarantees, from practicing, permitting or tolerating the enforced disappearance of persons".

== History ==
=== 1989 ===
The Inter-American Court of Human Rights asked the Venezuelan State to conduct an investigation to locate Abelardo Antonio Pérez, Andrés Eloy Suárez Sánchez, José Miguel Liscano Betancourt, Juan Acasio Mena Bello, and Jesús Rafael Villalobos, considered to be disappeared persons during the Caracazo.

=== 2004 ===
During the 2004 Venezuelan protests, the enforced disappearance of at least seven demonstrators was denounced.

=== 2015 ===
Social leader Alcedo Mora disappeared on 27 February 2015 after denouncing fuel smuggling to Colombia by members of the Mérida state government and Petróleos de Venezuela officials. In early March, the Eliécer and Jesús Vergel brothers, close to Mora, also disappeared, reportedly detained by the Bolivarian Intelligence Service (SEBIN).

=== 2017 ===
Journalist Jesús Medina Ezaine was detained in October 2017 along with journalists Roberto di Matteo (from Italy) and Filippo Rossi (from Switzerland), while reporting on at the Aragua Penitentiary Center, also known as Tocorón. He was reported missing while in custody. Jesus was later found in November on a Caracas highway, declaring that he had been tortured and threatened to be killed by his captors.

=== 2018 ===
The wife of military officer Igbert Marín Chaparro denounced that he was held incommunicado during the first days of his detention, after having been arrested on 2 March 2018, along with eight other officers, and having been the victim of torture by military officials.

Opposition councilman Fernando Albán was arrested on Oct. 5, 2018, at Simón Bolívar International Airport as he was returning to the country after forming part of an opposition delegation that attended the United Nations. No reasons were given for his arrest and no details were provided as to where he was being held until after his death three days later, on 8 October.

=== 2019 ===
Journalist Luis Carlos Díaz went missing for nine hours after being detained on 11 March 2019, after contact with him was lost while at work at Unión Radio station in Caracas. Bolivarian Intelligence Service agents raided and robbed his home in Caracas. Luis Carlos was released the following day, ordered to report to court every eight days and was forbidden to leave the country and to make statements to the media about his case.

Popular Will deputy Gilber Caro also missing went missing for weeks on several occasions. Caro was arrested on 11 January 2017 and a second time on 26 April 2019. During his detention his whereabouts were unknown, which the Office of the United Nations High Commissioner for Human Rights requested to know on 3 May. Caro was released after two months of disappearance. The deputy was detained a third time on 20 December 2019 along with his assistant, journalist Víctor Ugas. By 26 December, the place of confinement of both was unknown, and on the same day the Venezuelan National Assembly demanded that it be made public. On 10 January 2020 the Inter-American Commission on Human Rights declared that the detention was the second time that the deputy's whereabouts were unknown. Gilber Caro's lawyer reported finally being able to see and talk to him on 20 January, after a month of disappearance.

On 20 April 2019 the enforced disappearance of diver Hugo Marino happened, reportedly carried out by the General Directorate of Military Counterintelligence. After four years of this disappearance, the United Nations High Commissioner for Human Rights (OHCHR) demanded that investigations advance. According to the OHCHR report, enforced disappearance has been used In Venezuela as a method by the government to censor opponents and instill fear.

On 22 June 2019, the wife of corvette captain Rafael Acosta Arévalo denounced his disappearance and stated that she had spoken to him for the last time at 2:00 p.m. the previous day, while he was in a "personal meeting" in Guatire, Miranda state. That day, of the General Directorate of Military Counterintelligence and Bolivarian Intelligence Service officers arrested seven people, including active and retired military and police officers. On 26 June, after six days without knowing his whereabouts, the arrest of Acosta Arevalo was announced by the Minister of Communication and Information, Jorge Rodríguez, who accused three of them, including Acosta Arevalo, of preparing a coup d'état. Acosta Arevalo died three days later, on 29 June, after appearing at his arraignment in a wheelchair and with severe signs of torture, including many bruises on his arms, poor hand sensitivity, extreme swelling in his feet, traces of blood under his fingernails, and injuries to his torso. Acosta Arévalo was also unable to move his hands or feet, stand up or speak, with the exception of accepting the appointment of his defense attorney and calling for help from his lawyer. The judge ordered that Acosta Arévalo be transferred to the Army Military Hospital Dr. Vicente Salias Sanoja, located in Fort Tiuna in Caracas. Acosta Arévalo died that night in the military hospital.

A report produced between the non-governmental organizations Foro Penal and the Robert F. Kennedy Human Rights documented 200 cases of enforced disappearances in Venezuela in 2018 and 524 cases in 2019, a larger number attributed to an increase in protests in the country. The analysis concluded that the average disappearance lasted five days, suggesting that the government wished to avoid the scrutiny that could come with large-scale and long-term detentions.

=== 2020 ===
Venezuela's National Assembly reported on 21 January 2020 that family, friends and colleagues of deputy Ismael León lost contact with him shortly after he left the headquarters of the Democratic Action party on his way to the legislative session. After two days of detention, without knowing his whereabouts, León was released with precautionary measures.

Journalist Roland Carreño was arrested on 27 October after being intercepted by unmarked black vehicles. His whereabouts were unknown for more than 24 hours. Different human rights organizations qualified his detention as an enforced disappearance, including Foro Penal, and the Juan Guaidó's administration held Nicolás Maduro responsible for any aggression against Carreño and his companions. Maduro's administration confirmed Carreño's arrest the following day.

=== 2023 ===
On 7 December 2023, the non-governmental organization Súmate denounced that the place of detention of its president, Roberto Abdul, was unknown after he was arrested the day before, in violation of the Venezuelan Constitutio. The NGO Foro Penal described Roberto's detention as a forced disappearance.

=== 2024 ===
On 9 February 2024 Rocío San Miguel was detained by Venezuelan security officials, at the Simón Bolívar International Airport in Maiquetía, along with her daughter. The same day her father, her two brothers and another relative also were arrested. After being held incommunicado for ten days and without her whereabouts being known, her daughter was able to visit her in El Helicoide. Human rights organizations, such as Amnesty International, PROVEA and the Women's Broad Front, have rejected the detention, described it as a enforced disappearance and asking for her immediate release.

== See also ==
- Revolving door effect
- Operation Tun Tun
- Political prisoners in Venezuela
- Human rights in Venezuela
- 2016 Tumeremo massacre
- Iguala mass kidnapping
- Mothers of the Plaza de Mayo
- Enforced disappearances in Chile
- Independent International Fact-Finding Mission on Venezuela
