= Centro Gumilla =

Coordinates: 10°30′41.62″N 66°54′51.41″W

- Established: 1968; 58 years ago
- Headquarters: 1010 Avenida Oeste 7 Caracas, Venezuela
- Affiliations: Jesuit, Catholic
- Staff: 26 (7 Jesuits)
- Website: Gumilla (in Spanish)

Centro Gumilla is a center for research and social action run by the Society of Jesus in Venezuela. It was founded in 1968 and is the first such centre created in Latin America under Pedro Arrupe to direct Jesuit efforts more toward the service of the poor.

In its range of publications, projects, and case histories, Centro Gumilla tries to foster organizational growth and community empowerment.

== See also ==
- List of Jesuit sites
