= Political prisoners in Venezuela =

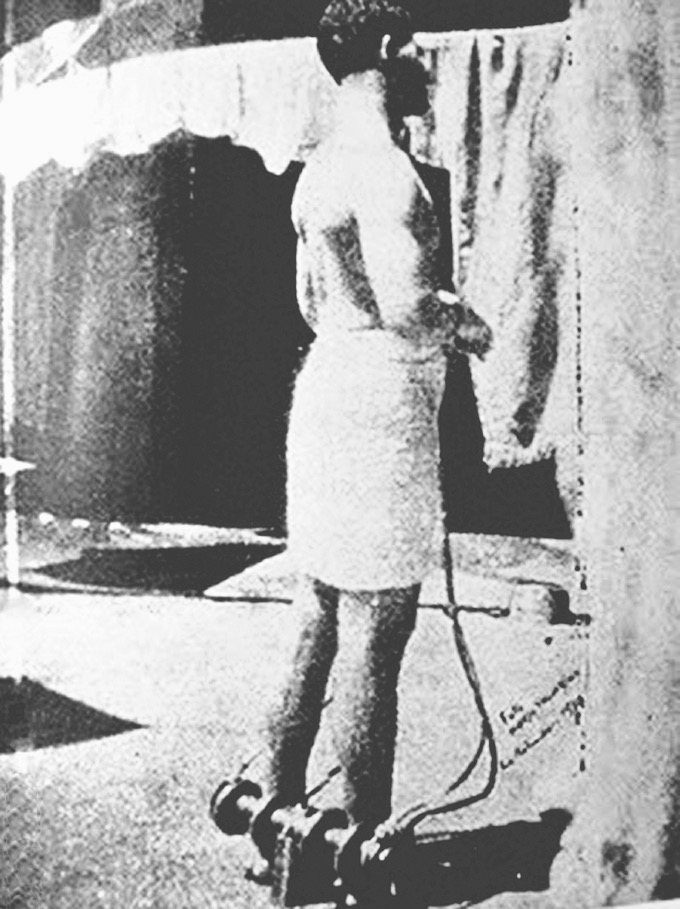
Prisoner at La Rotunda wearing bolt and shackle on his ankles

Throughout its history, many people have been arrested and imprisoned in Venezuela for political reasons, mainly during the dictatorship of Juan Vicente Gómez and that of Marcos Pérez Jiménez in the 20th century and during the Bolivarian Revolution in the 21st century.

In 2026, the United Nations Human Rights Council mandated Independent International Fact-Finding Mission on Venezuela estimated that over 800 political prisoners remain arbitrary held in Venezuela.

== Definition ==
The Venezuelan non-governmental organization Foro Penal, which keeps track of political prisoners in the country, has elaborated a definition for political prisoners during the Bolivarian Revolution:

- For political causes: Those persons persecuted or arbitrarily detained who are accused of crimes or infractions traditionally characterized as "political", including "rebellion", "plot" or "treason", among others (as long as no violence has been used), with a political objective, which in turn can be divided into one or more categories.
- For political purposes: Those persons arbitrarily persecuted or detained to fulfill a political objective.
- Supervening: Those persons who are not arbitrarily or illegally persecuted or detained, but are afterwards subjected by the authorities to conditions of persecution, prosecution or imprisonment that flagrantly violate their human rights for a political objective, whether formally declared or not, of the authorities.

Foro Penal also divides into six different categories the objectives or purposes that determine whether a persecution or repressive action is political or not:

- Exclusion: Political persecution for individually representing a political threat to the government for being political or social leaders. The objective of persecution is the exclusion of the individual from the political sphere, his neutralization as a factor of political or social mobilization, and his isolation from the rest of the population.
- Intimidation: Political persecuted who are part of a social group, rather than representing an individual political threat to power. The objective of the persecution is the intimidation of the group or sector to which they belong, including students, activists, journalists, judges, military officers and among others.
- Propaganda: Political targets who, without being considered an individual or collective political threat, are used to support an official narrative or discourse related to a national situation with the aim of evading responsibility for the failure of public policies or measures.
- Extraction: Politically persecuted persons, generally deprived of their liberty, with the objective of obtaining information that will allow the location of other politically persecuted persons. This category includes cases of detention of family members or friends of the person sought, and in several cases the extraction of information is carried out under torture.
- Revenge: Political persecuted whose rights are violated as expressions of abuse of power, personal and direct, by authorities who use their political influence and positions in repressive structures to defend personal or individual interests. The political objective is not collective but personal.
- Hostages: Persons detained or persecuted to obtain influence in negotiations with countries or international organizations in accordance with the Venezuelan government's foreign policy needs.

== History ==
=== Antonio Guzmán Blanco dictatorship ===
During the government of Antonio Guzmán Blanco, political repression was constant and overwhelming. Many people were silenced for fear of reprisals. It is estimated that thousands of people were persecuted, imprisoned and exiled, some of which never returned to the country. This also had a negative impact on Venezuelan society, which hindered the development of democracy and freedom of expression in Venezuela.

=== Juan Vicente Gómez dictatorship ===
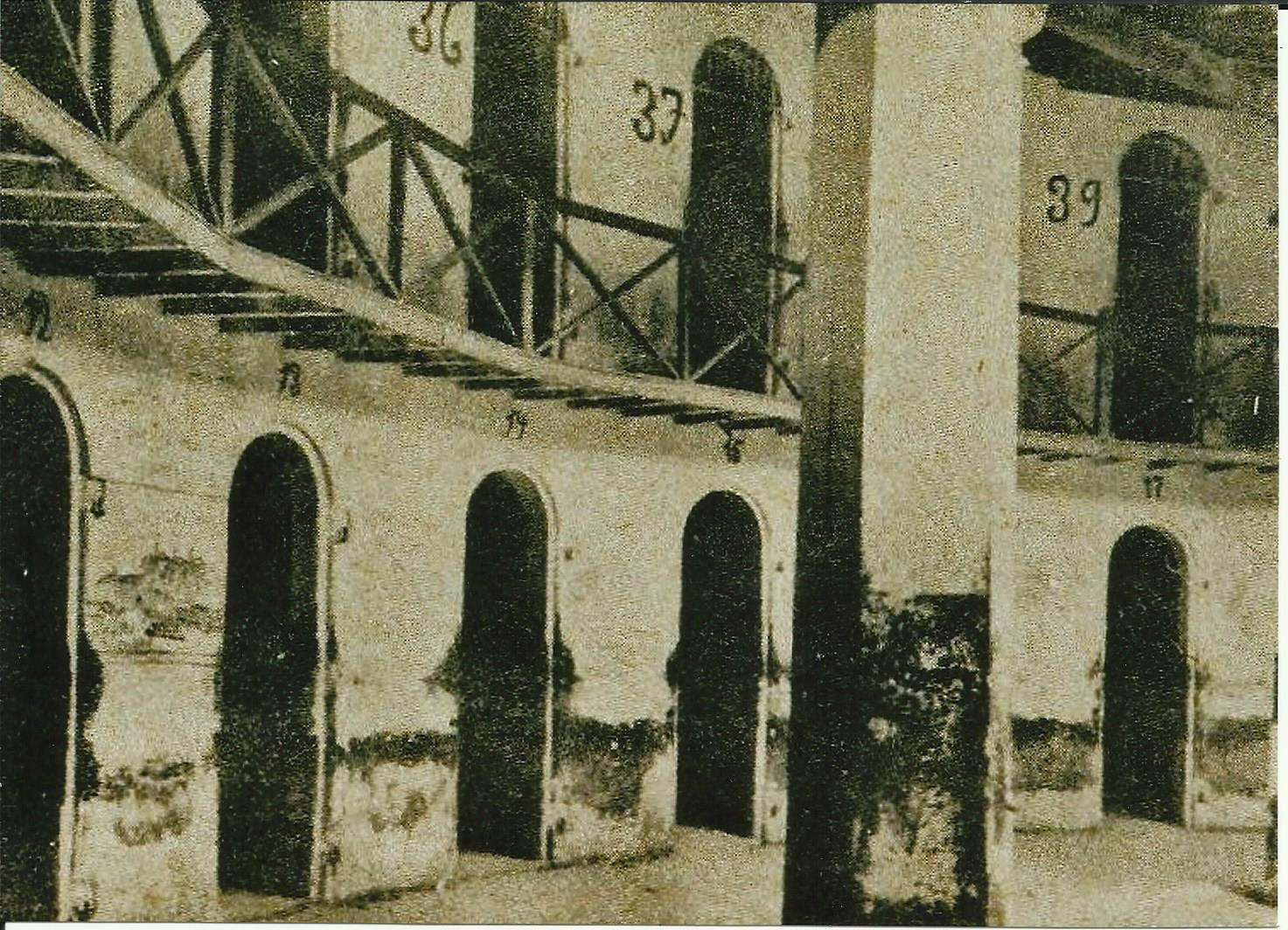
La Rotunda, one of the main prisons during the dictatorship of Juan Vicente Gómez

Initially, Juan Vicente Gómez began his government by granting freedom to political prisoners and reestablishing freedom of the press, but he refused to dissolve the National Congress of Venezuela and call for a constituent assembly, a petition that was quite popular at the time. Despite the facade of liberties promoted by Gómez, there were early cases of repression of the press and certain political sectors. From 1913 onwards, repression was exacerbated, the year in which Gómez decided to remain in power.

During the dictatorship of Juan Vicente Gómez, people who were imprisoned were shackled with shackles and steel bolts on their feet and were victims of numerous tortures. The shackles held the prisoners' ankles, immobilizing and injuring them. Poison was often put in the food of prisoners under assassination orders, and crushed glass in their drinks to cause greater suffering at the time of death. Opponents to the Gómez regime were killed, imprisoned or disappeared. Torture methods ranged from the most conventional to the death penalty.

Many political prisoners were sent to forced labor, the most famous of which was the construction of the Transandean Highway in the Venezuelan Andes. One of the cruelest torturers in La Rotunda was a common prisoner named Nereo Pacheco who, by orders of Gómez, was used by the guards as an element of punishment against the political prisoners.

=== Marcos Pérez Jiménez dictatorship ===
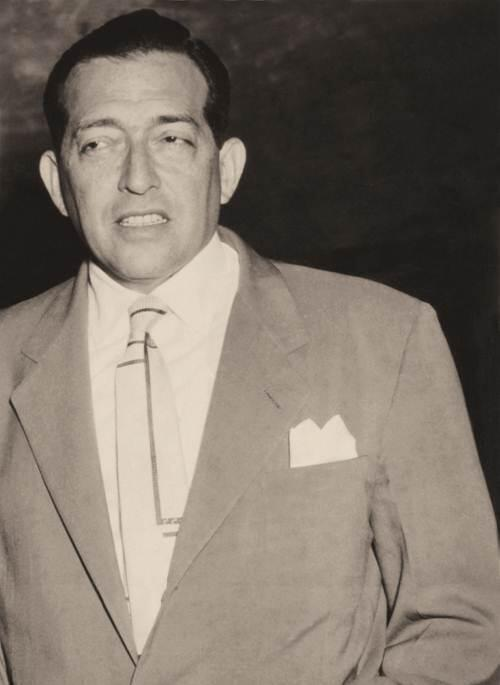
Pedro Estrada, head of the Dirección de Seguridad Nacional during the dictatorship of Marcos Pérez Jiménez.

The dictatorship of Marcos Pérez Jiménez created a secret police, the Dirección de Seguridad Nacional, that was in charge of arresting, torturing and imprisoning political opponents, and was characterized by its excessive repression of dissidence and torture of detainees. In the National Security headquarters throughout the country, political prisoners were subjected to different methods of torture, such as the ice chamber, standing up barefoot in a car rims, blows with steel balls, electric bands, batons and other forms of physical mistreatment.

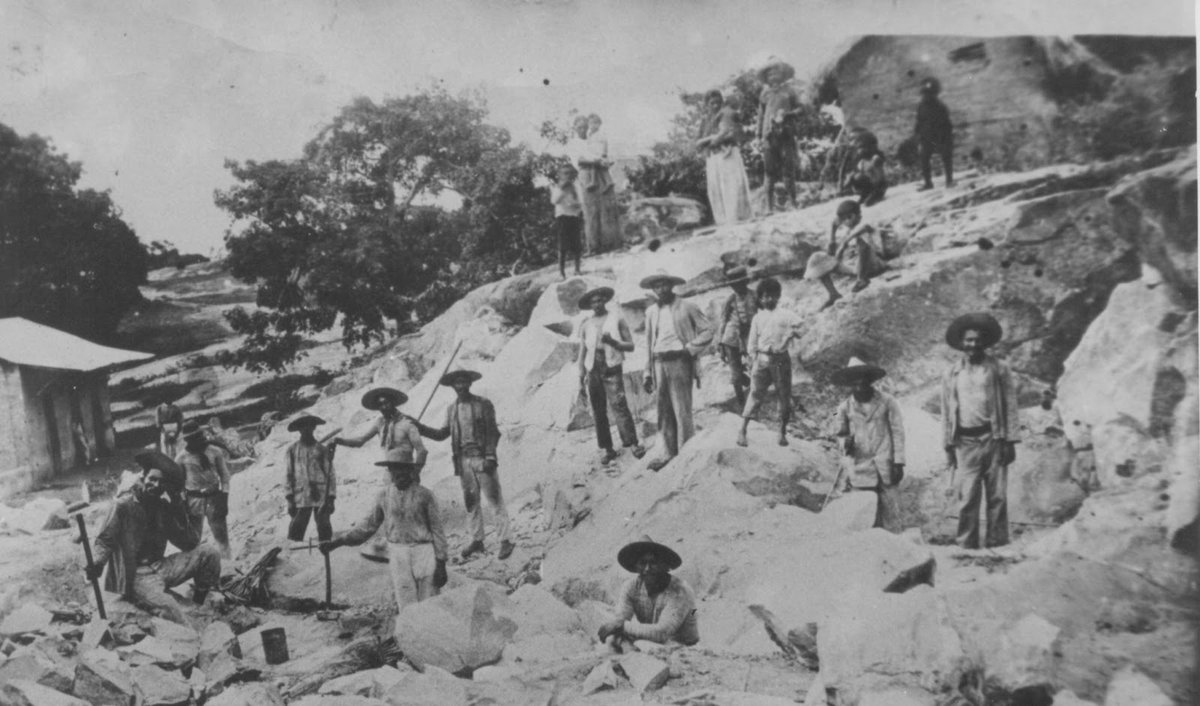
Guasina Island prisoners

At that time, the Colón Square in Los Caobos, Caracas, was the epicenter of student protests. During the celebration of Columbus Day in 1951, several Venezuelans who were protesting against the dictatorship were arrested: José Amín, Miguel Astor Martínez, Antonio Ávila Barrios, Francisco Barrios, Federico Estaba, Gerardo Estaba, Luis José Estaba, Darío Hernández, Manuel Vicente Magallanes, Eloy Martínez Méndez, Salom Meza Espinosa and Juan Regalado. This group was known as The Twelve Apostles because they were a dozen detainees. The twelve apostles were forced to stand together for three days, deprived of their physiological needs. Each one was tortured in a personalized way.

Although the Pérez Jiménez regime announced the closure of the labor camp on Guasina Island on 17 December 1952, in Delta Amacuro state, records such as the work Se llamaba SN, by José Vicente Abreu, document the forced labor and subhuman conditions on the island.

On 29 September 1952, in the Turén Municipality of the Portuguesa state, a peasant uprising against the national government began, attacking a National Guard outpost. The movement was strongly repressed, resulting in more than a hundred deaths and several arrests.

=== Bolivarian Revolution ===
The United Nations High Commissioner for Human Rights (UNHCHR) denounced that during the 2017 Venezuelan protests "several thousand people have been arbitrarily detained, many of them have been victims of ill-treatment and even torture". Some of the victims of enforced disappearance have not yet appeared, as is the case of Hugo Marino. Since 2015, at least twelve political prisoners have died in custody. According to the NGO PROVEA, between 2013 and 2023, 53,075 people were detained for political reasons or in the context of illegal actions by police and/or military. By October 2022, the NGO Foro Penal registered 245 political prisoners in Venezuela. At least 166 had been imprisoned without having been convicted and one is a minor. In January 2026, the Independent International Fact-Finding Mission on Venezuela led by the United States Human Right Council reported over 800 political prisoners. After the 2026 United States intervention in Venezuela, the government started releasing various political prisoners but the Independent International Fact-Finding Mission on Venezuela reported that the Venezuelan government fell far short of its international human rights obligations and called for the "immediate and unconditional" release of those arbitrary detained..

In 2026, NGOs reported that at least 26 political prisoners died in detention since 2015.

==== Amnesty law and close down of El Helicoide ====
After the 2026 United States intervention in Venezuela, acting president Delcy Rodríguez confirmed the closure of El Helicoide and its transformation into a sports and cultural center for the security forces. At the same time, during the opening ceremony of the judicial year before the Supreme Court of Justice, the president announced a draft general amnesty law that would theoretically cover all cases since the arrival of Chavismo in 1999. The scope of the bill would cover not only political prisoners but also drop criminal charges against numerous exiled political leaders.

== By year of arrest ==
The individuals listed below are those whose detentions have taken place in the 21st century and have been qualified as arbitrary by the United Nations Working Group on Arbitrary Detention, prisoners of conscience according to Amnesty International or classified as political prisoners by the non-governmental organization Foro Penal, among other reasons:

Before 2014

- Francisco Usón (2004)
- Henry Vivas (2004)
- Iván Simonovis (2004)
- Lázaro Forero (2004)
- Otoniel Guevara Pérez (2004)
- Rolando Guevara Pérez (2004)
- Carlos Ortega Carvajal (2005)
- Eligio Cedeño (2007)
- Biagio Pilieri (2009)
- María Lourdes Afiuni (2009)
- Raúl Isaías Baduel (2009)
- Alejandro Peña Esclusa (2010)
- Oswaldo Álvarez Paz (2010)

2014

- Daniel Ceballos
- Enzo Scarano
- Gabriel Valles Sguerzi
- Gilberto Sojo
- Inés González Árraga
- Leopoldo López
- Lorent Saleh
- Renzo Prieto
- Rodolfo Pedro González
- Rosmit Mantilla
- Ruperto Sánchez
- Sandra Flores de Garzón
- Víctor Ugas

2015

- Antonio Garbi
- Antonio Ledezma

2016

- Braulio Jatar
- Carlos Andrés García
- Joshua Holt
- Villca Fernández
- Yon Goicoechea

2017

- Alfredo Ramos
- Ángel Zerpa Aponte
- Lisbeth Añez
- Rafael Arreaza
- Raúl Isaías Baduel
- Citgo Six
  - Alirio Zambrano
  - Gustavo Cárdenas
  - Jorge Toledo
  - José Pereira
  - José Zambrano
- Wuilly Arteaga

2018

- Ángela Expósito
- Ariana Granadillo
- Billy Six
- Carola Hernández
- Simón Torres
- Jhonaider Ceiba
- Gilberto Quintero
- Emirlendris Benítez
- Enrique Aristeguieta Gramcko
- Fernando Albán Salazar
- Geraldine Chacón
- Igbert Marín Chaparro
- Jesús Medina Ezaine
- José Alberto Marulanda
- Juan Caguaripano
- Juan Requesens
- Pedro Jaimes Criollo
- Rafaela Requesens
- Rubén González
- Vasco da Costa
- Williams Aguado

2019

- Antonia Turbay
- Edgar Zambrano
- Gilber Caro
- Karen Palacios
- Luis Carlos Díaz
- Pedro Santana
- Diego Sánchez Díaz
- María Auxiliadora Delgado
- Rafael Acosta Arévalo
- Roberto Marrero
- Salvador Franco

2020

- Darvinson Rojas
- Gabriel Andrés Medina
- Nicmer Evans
- Roland Carreño

2021

- Freddy Guevara
- Javier Tarazona
- Milagros Mata Gil
- Orlando Moreno
- Rafael Rattia

2022

- Alcides Bracho
- Alonso Meléndez
- Emilio Negrín
- Gabriel Blanco
- Néstor Astudillo
- Olga Mata
- Reynaldo Cortés

2023

- John Álvarez
- Leoner Azuaje
- María Fernanda Rodríguez
- Nelson Piñero
- Roberto Abdul

2024

- Guillermo López (disappeared)
- Juan Freites (disappeared)
- Luis Camacaro (disappeared)
- Víctor Venegas
- Rocío San Miguel
- Biagio Pilieri
- Freddy Superlano
- Roland Carreño
- Perkins Rocha

2025

- Enrique Márquez
- Juan Pablo Guanipa
- Rafael Tudares

== Current political prisoners ==
Among the current political prisoners are the following:

| Prisoner | Arrest date | Detention time |
|---|---|---|
| Héctor Rovain | 19 April 2003 | 23 years, 2 months and 8 days |
| Erasmo José Bolívar | 19 April 2003 | 23 years, 2 months and 8 days |
| Luis Molina | 19 April 2003 | 23 years, 2 months and 8 days |
| Otoniel Guevara Pérez | 23 November 2004 | 21 years, 7 months and 4 days |
| Rolando Guevara Pérez | 23 November 2004 | 21 years, 7 months and 4 days |
| Juan Caguaripano | 6 August 2017 | 8 years, 10 months and 21 days |
| Igbert Marín Chaparro | 8 March 2018 | 8 years, 3 months and 19 days |
| Emirlendris Benítez | 5 August 2018 | 7 years, 10 months and 22 days |
| Ángela Expósito | 21 September 2018 | 7 years, 9 months and 6 days |
| Rubén González | 30 November 2018 | 6 years, 6 months and 28 days |
| María Auxiliadora Delgado | 19 March 2019 | 7 years, 3 months and 8 days |
| Gilberto Sojo | 25 February 2021 | 5 years, 4 months and 2 days |
| Ángel Vivas | 10 May 2022 | 4 years, 1 month and 17 days |
| Nelson Piñero | 21 November 2023 | 2 years, 7 months and 6 days |
| Juan Freites | 23 January 2024 | 2 years, 5 months and 4 days |
| Luis Camacaro | 23 January 2024 | 2 years, 5 months and 4 days |
| Guillermo López | 24 January 2024 | 2 years, 5 months and 3 days |

== See also ==
- Human rights in Venezuela
- Revolving door effect
- Torture in Venezuela
- Enforced disappearances in Venezuela
