= Plaza Venezuela =

Urban park in Caracas, Venezuela

Coordinates: 10.497°N 66.886°W

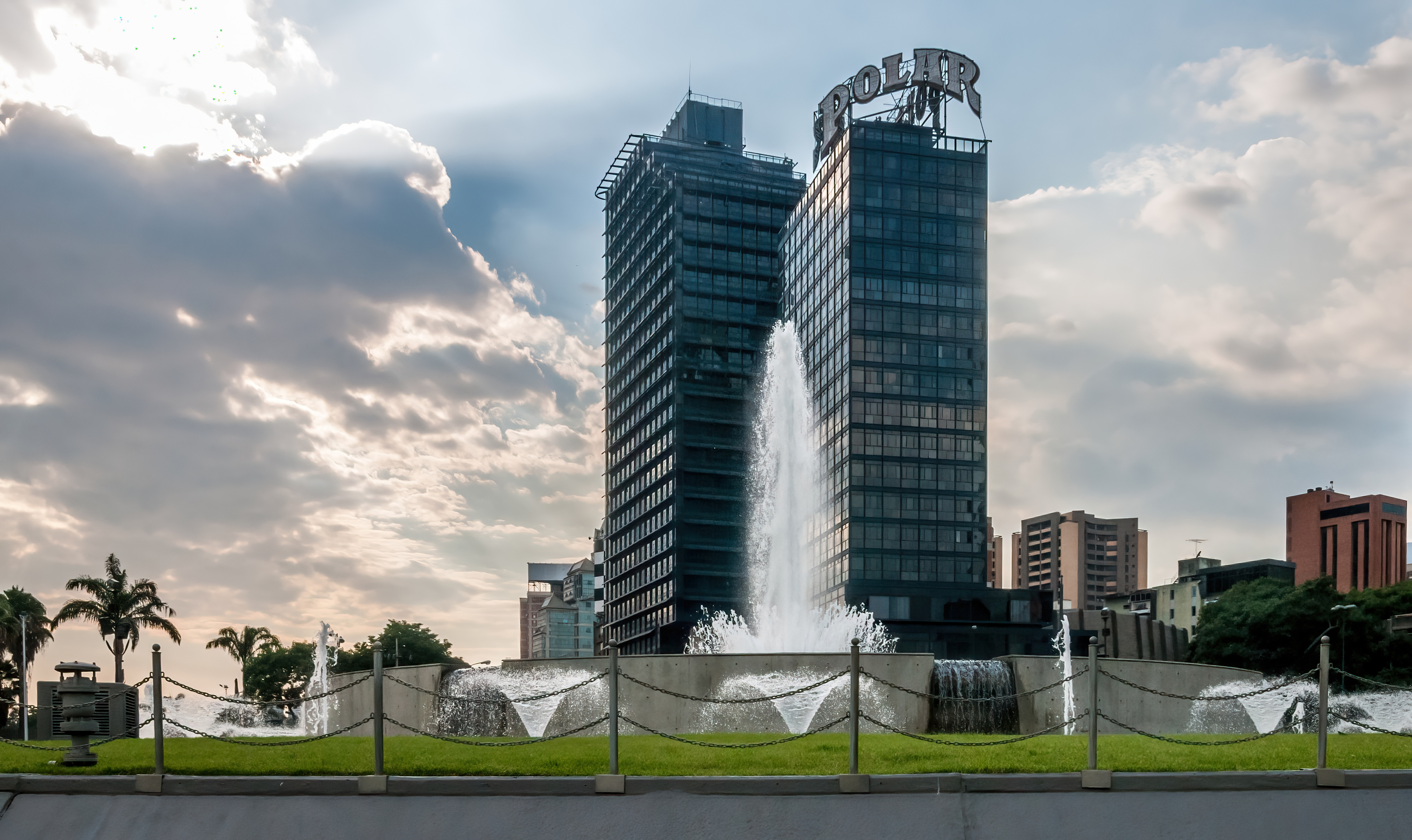
Plaza Venezuela

Plaza Venezuela (Venezuela Square in Spanish) is a public square located in Los Caobos neighborhood, Caracas, Venezuela. It was inaugurated in 1940 and is situated in the geographic center of Caracas.

Its place for many landmarks of Caracas, including a fountain with lights, Phelps Tower, the Christopher Columbus monument of Manuel de la Cova, the Fisicromía tribute to Andrés Bello of Carlos Cruz-Diez and the Open Solar sculpture of Alejandro Otero.

Also provides access to other important places like the University City and the Botanical Garden of Caracas, the Twin Towers of Central Park, the Boulevard of Sabana Grande and the Cultural Arts Center. Between 2007 and 2009, a restoration plan was carried out in the area by PDVSA La Estancia Art Center.

The fountain has undergone five projects dating from 1940 to the new opened on August 9, 2009, version, which incorporates media technology in lighting control and solid state devices. It is the first version of this source that incorporates music.

The eponymous station of Caracas Metro is nearby.
