= El Helicoide =

Venezuelan political prison

- Caracas, Venezuela
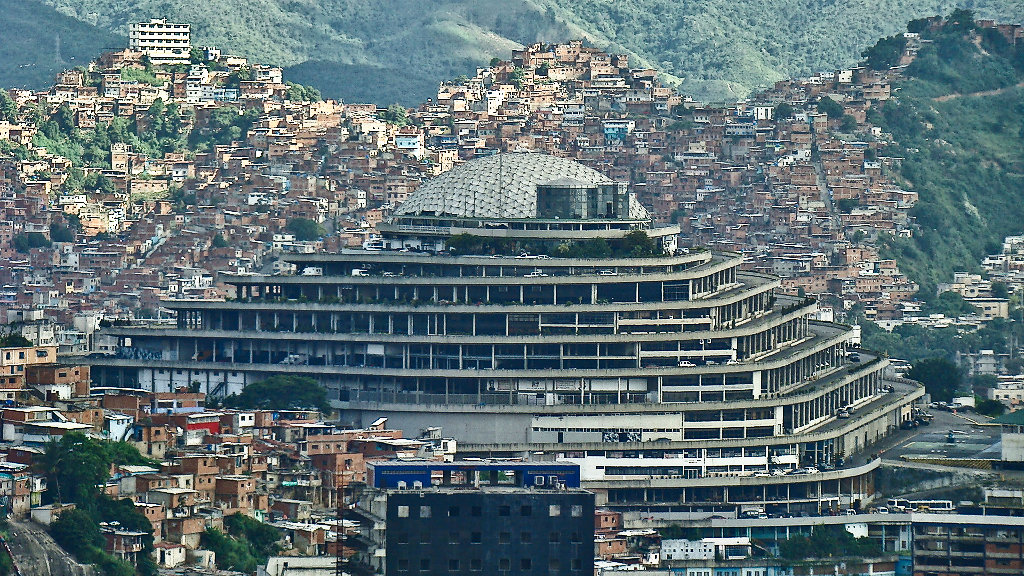

Site information
- Type: Office building, prison
- Owner: Government of Venezuela
- Operator: SEBIN
- Controlled by: Ministry of Interior, Justice and Peace
- Condition: In service

Location
- Coordinates: 10.4894°N 66.9099°W

Site history
- Built: 1961
- In use: 1984
- Events: Crisis in Venezuela: Venezuelan protests

El Helicoide is a building in Caracas, Venezuela, owned by the Venezuelan government and used as a facility and prison for both regular and political prisoners of the Bolivarian National Intelligence Service (SEBIN). In the shape of a three-sided pyramid, it was originally constructed as a shopping mall, but never completed.

During the Nicolás Maduro administration, El Helicoide became a high-profile prison for political detainees where systemic torture and human rights violations have taken place. Prisoners have reported "people being beaten, electrocuted, hung by their limbs, forced into stress positions and forced to plunge their face into a bag of faeces and breathe in".

== History ==
El Helicoide is built on a hill in Roca Tarpeya between the parishes of San Pedro and San Agustín, in the extension of the avenues Armed Forces, President Medina Angarita, and Nueva Granada. It has the shape of a three-sided pyramid with curved points formed by elevated paved roads intended for vehicle traffic and parking around an enclosed central area.

=== Concept ===
Its construction was undertaken by a private company during the government of then-president Marcos Pérez Jiménez in 1956. It was designed by the architects Pedro Neuberger, Dirk Bornhorst and Jorge Romero Gutiérrez. The project was to have included 300 boutiques, eight cinemas, a heliport, a 5-star hotel, a park, a club of owners and a show palace on the seventh level. The building would include a 4 km long ramp spiraling around the structure itself, allowing vehicles to enter the building and park inside. The project would have cost $10 million in 1958, or $90 million in 2018.

In preparation for the project, many families were evicted from shanty towns in San Agustín and had their homes demolished.

=== Cancellation ===
Following the 1958 Venezuelan coup d'état which resulted in the overthrow of dictator Marcos Pérez Jiménez, developers were accused of being funded by Pérez Jiménez's government. The incoming government refused to allow the mall's construction and litigation surrounding the project began involving the developers, businesses and the government. Nelson Rockefeller made offers to take over the project, but regulations resulted in the withdrawal of his proposal. By 1961, construction of the building came to a halt after the development firm fell into bankruptcy one year before completion. That same year the project was exhibited at the Museum of Modern Art in New York City.

In 1965, attempts were made to resume its construction to complete it by 1967, though plans fell through. Over time, only the concrete foundation of the project was present while equipment destined for the cancelled mall was stolen, including custom high-speed Austrian elevators.

=== Government facility ===
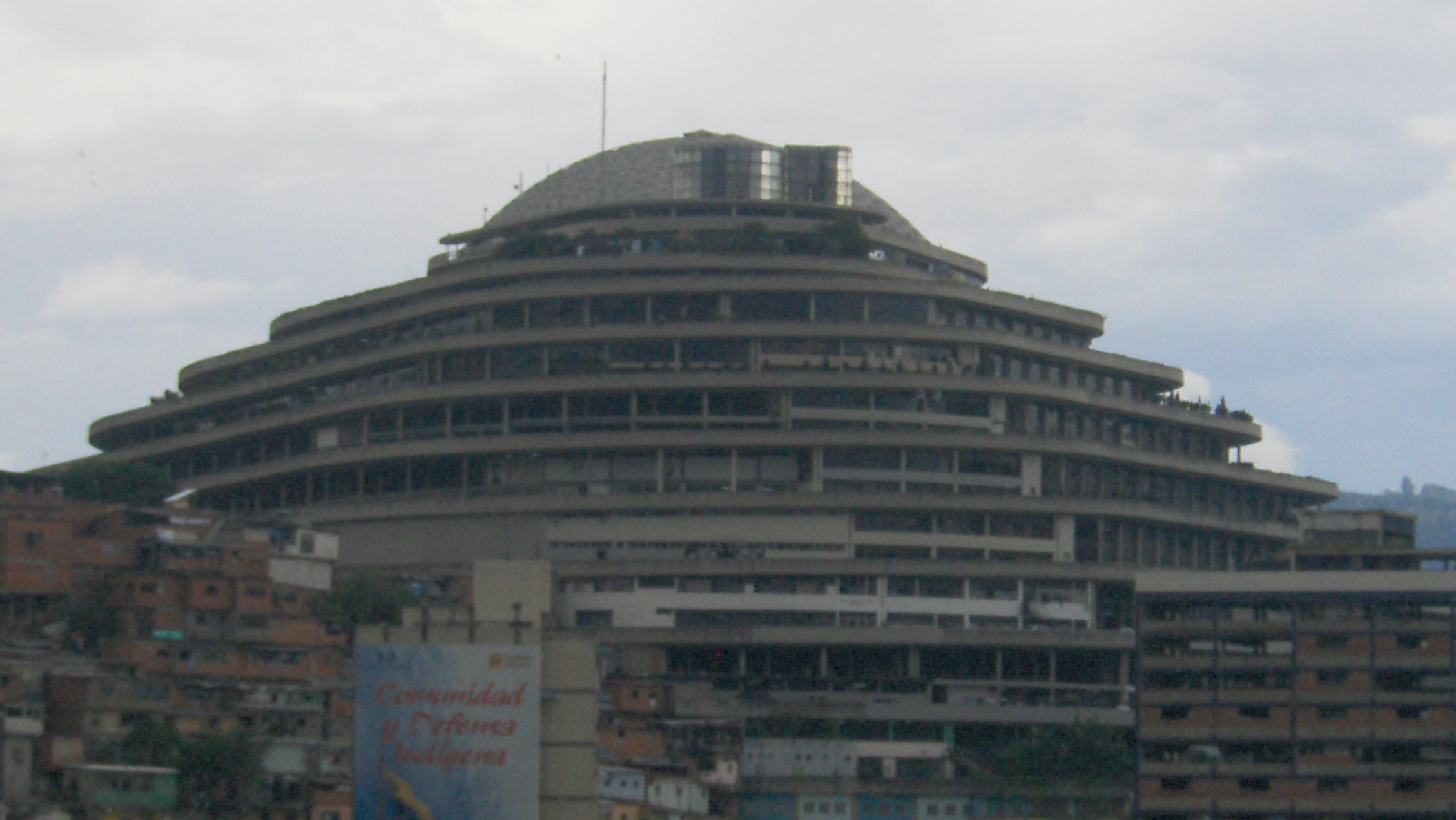
Another view of the structure

In 1975, the Venezuelan government acquired the facility. Between 1979 and 1982, 10,000 squatters occupied the facility until they were evicted. By 1982, only the geodesic dome with its aluminum top on the concrete infrastructure was completed.

From 1984, some state agencies were gradually installed in the building, the most important of which was the Directorate of Intelligence and Prevention Services (DISIP). In 1985, DISIP purchased a 15-year lease for the lower two floors of El Helicoide, where prison cells are presently located. The building was seriously affected by a bombing in the 1992 Venezuelan coup d'état attempts and an anti-aircraft response from it. The dome was later repaired following these events.

=== Bolivarian Revolution ===
External videos
- El Helicoide: The Shopping Mall That Became A Torture Prison on YouTube from BBC News

Since 2010, part of the building serves as the headquarters of the National Experimental Security University (UNES). As unrest grew surrounding the Nicolás Maduro government, offices, storerooms and even lavatories were converted into makeshift holding areas for the growing number of prisoners. Prisoners describe it as a place where systematic torture and human rights violations occur. The role of El Helicoide in Venezuela’s political context has been documented by various organizations, including Human Rights Watch and the Foro Penal. These entities have reported on the conditions inside the building and linked them to a pattern of alleged human rights violations in the country.

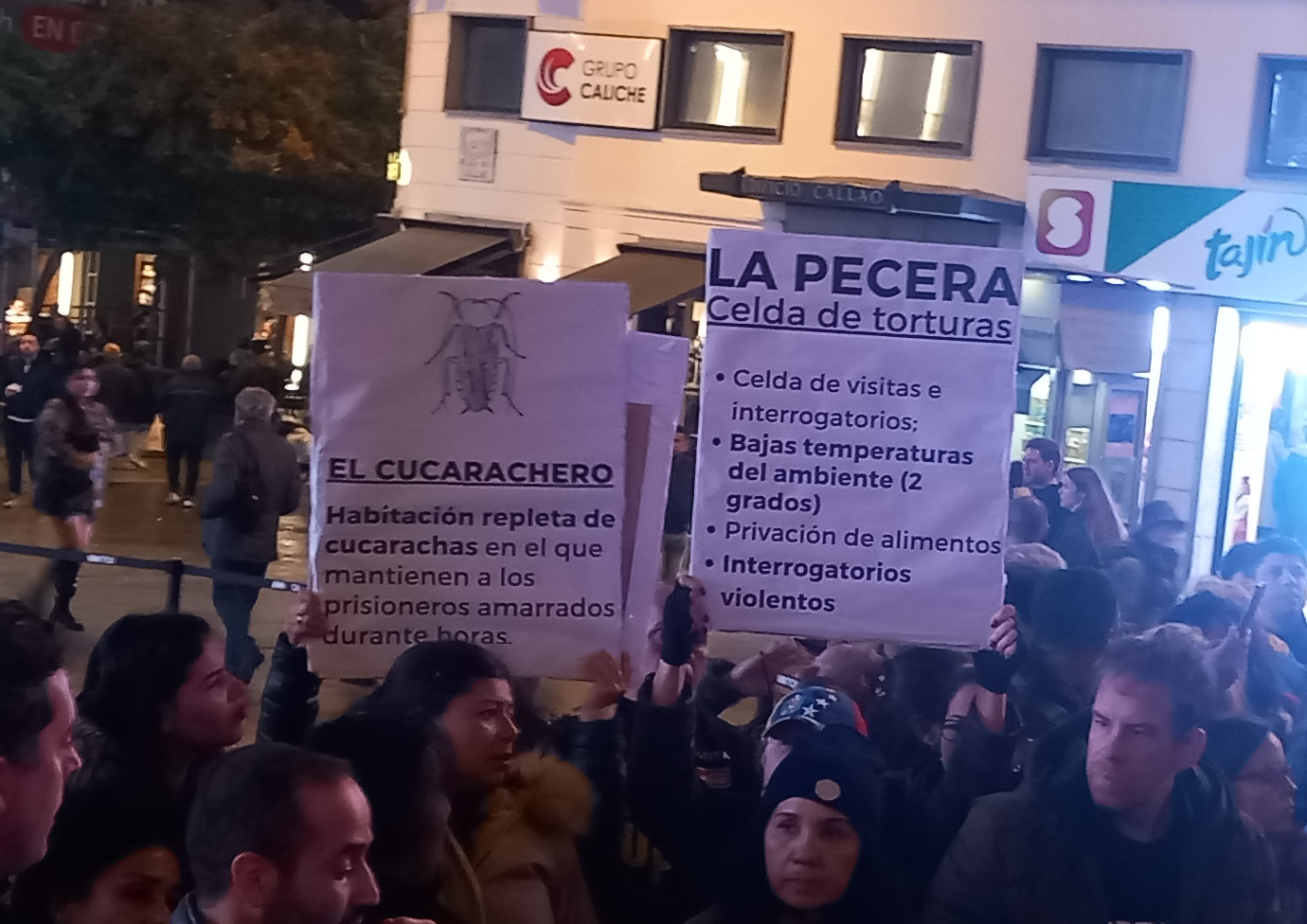
Banners at a protest describing torture cells in El Helicoide, 2023

On 16 May 2018, a prison riot occurred in El Helicoide, with several political prisoners arrested during the protests; Venezuelan authorities fired tear gas and buckshot at individuals in the area. Among the inmates was the American Joshua Holt; the U.S. Embassy in Caracas expressed concern that Holt and other U.S. citizens were in danger.

==== Closure ====
Following the capture of Nicolás Maduro and his wife Cilia Flores during the U.S. military operation on January 3, 2026, Delcy Rodríguez assumed the interim presidency. In the days that followed, President Donald Trump publicly announced that a "torture chamber in the heart of Caracas" was being shut down, referring explicitly to El Helicoide. Trump described it as part of efforts to dismantle the repressive apparatus of the previous regime, calling it a "torture center" and linking it to abuses against opponents.

At the same time, the interim government announced the release of a "significant number" of political prisoners (Venezuelans and foreigners) as a "unilateral gesture of peace". Human rights organizations confirmed releases, with family members gathered outside the building awaiting further releases. Some sections of the complex began to empty, with reports of transfers and dismantling operations. However, there is no definitive official confirmation from the interim Venezuelan authorities of a total closure or complete dismantling.

On January 30, 2026, Delcy Rodríguez confirmed the facility's closure and its transformation into a sports and cultural center for the security forces. At the same time, during the opening ceremony of the judicial year before the Supreme Court of Justice, the president announced a draft general amnesty law that would theoretically cover all cases since the arrival of Chavismo in 1999. The scope of the bill would cover not only political prisoners but also drop criminal charges against numerous exiled political leaders.

== Cells ==
El Helicoide originally had a cell known as "Preventive I" in its Access Area, also known as "Infiernito" (Little Hell), with dimensions of 3 x 5 meters and where new arrivals were held. By 2014, it was the only cell of this type, but when detentions began to increase, three additional areas were created later, known as "Preventive II", "Preventive III" and "Preventive IV". By 2015, Preventiva I was intended for common prisoners, while the other three cells were intended for students, Twitter users and "guarimberos". One of the largest cells in El Helicoide was referred to as the "Guarimbero" cell, itself an annex of the "Guantánamo" cell. While "Guantánamo" held the majority of non-political detainees, detainees arrested during protests or opposition were incarcerated in the "Guarimbero" cell. Both cells have been overcrowded and in very poor conditions, with no access to water or toilets, and where inmates have had to sleep on the floor.

== Dimensions ==
- Total area: 101,940 m^{2}
- Built area: 77,748 m^{2}
- Commercial premises: 46,715 m^{2}
- Roads and green areas: 29,192 m^{2}
- Exhibition and industry area: 8.445 m^{2}

== See also ==
- La Tumba (Caracas)
- Casa de los Sueños
- Víctor Navarro
- Enforced disappearances in Venezuela
- Political prisoners in Venezuela
- Torture in Venezuela

== Sources ==
- Independent International Fact-Finding Mission on Venezuela (15 September 2020). Conclusiones detalladas de la Misión internacional independiente de determinación de los hechos sobre la República Bolivariana de Venezuela [Detailed findings of the independent international fact-finding mission on the Bolivarian Republic of Venezuela] (PDF) (in Spanish).
- Independent International Fact-Finding Mission on Venezuela (12 September 2022). Crímenes de lesa humanidad cometidos a través de los servicios de inteligencia del Estado: estructuras y personas involucradas en la implementación de un plan para reprimir la oposición al gobierno [Crimes against humanity committed through the State intelligence services: structures and individuals involved in the implementation of a plan to repress opposition to the government.].
