= Bolivarian National Intelligence Service =

Intelligence agency and secret police of Venezuela

Coordinates: 10°29′43″N 66°52′57″W

- Servicio Bolivariano de Inteligencia Nacional (Spanish); SEBIN
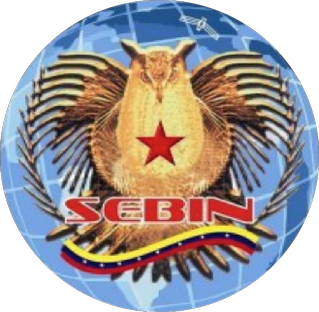
- Seal of the Bolivarian National Intelligence Service

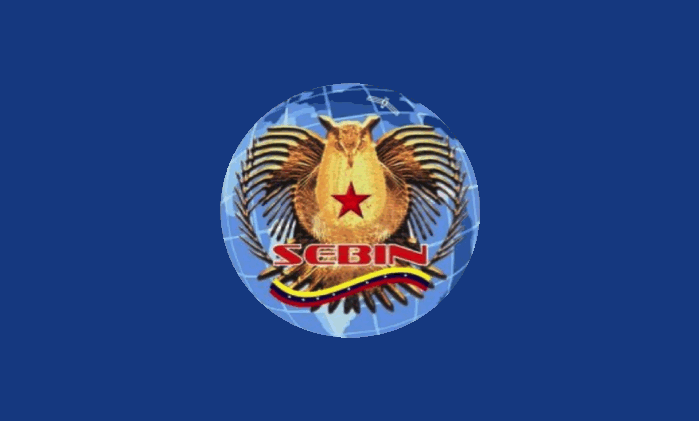
- Flag of the Bolivarian Intelligence Service

Intelligence agency overview
- Formed: June 2, 2010; 16 years ago
- Preceding Intelligence agency: DISIP
- Headquarters: Plaza Venezuela, Caracas, Venezuela
- Employees: Classified
- Annual budget: $169 million (2013)
- Intelligence agency executives: Delcy Rodríguez; Alexis Rodríguez Cabello
- Parent department: Vice President of Venezuela

The Bolivarian National Intelligence Service (Spanish: Servicio Bolivariano de Inteligencia Nacional, SEBIN) is the premier intelligence agency in Venezuela. SEBIN is an internal security force subordinate to the Vice President of Venezuela since 2012 and is dependent on the Acting President Delcy Rodríguez. SEBIN has been described as the secret police force of the Bolivarian government.

== History ==
The Venezuelan intelligence agency has an extensive record of human rights violations, including recent allegations of torture and murder of political opponents.

=== Predecessors ===
The predecessor of SEBIN was established in March 1969 with the name of DISIP, Dirección Nacional de los Servicios de Inteligencia y Prevención ("National Directorate of Intelligence and Prevention Services"), by then-president Rafael Caldera, replacing the Dirección General de Policía (DIGEPOL).

Human Rights Watch wrote in 1993 that DISIP was involved in targeting political dissenters within Venezuela and was involved in abusive tactics. In their 1997 and 1998 reports, Amnesty International also detailed human rights violations by DISIP, including unlawful detention of Venezuelan human rights activists.

=== Bolivarian Revolution ===
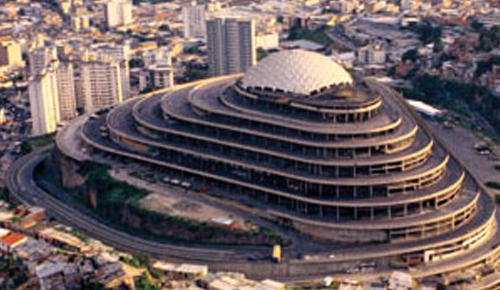
El Helicoide, the first headquarters of SEBIN

In 1999, President Hugo Chávez began the restructuring of DISIP, with commanders and analysts being selected for their political attributes and rumors of some armed civilian groups gaining credentials from such actions. A retired SEBIN commissioner explained that there began to be "biased and incomplete reports, tailored to the new ears, that began to proliferate and ultimately affects the ability of the institution to process information and know what happens". On December 4, 2009, President Chávez, during a swearing-in ceremony for the high command of the recently created Bolivarian National Police (Policía Nacional Bolivariana), announced the change of name of DISIP, with immediate effect, to Bolivarian Intelligence Service (Servicio Bolivariano de Inteligencia, or SEBIN).

The restructuring of SEBIN was completed in 2013 with one of its goals to guarantee the "continuity and consolidation of the Bolivarian Revolution in power". In the beginning of the 2014 Venezuelan protests, SEBIN agents opened fire on protesters which resulted in the deaths of two and the dismissal of Brigadier General Manuel Gregorio Bernal Martinez days later.

Under the Nicolás Maduro presidency, a building that was originally intended to be a subway station and offices in Plaza Venezuela was converted into the headquarters for SEBIN.

== Domestic actions ==
=== Media ===
SEBIN had raided facilities of reporters and human rights defenders several times. It was also stated that SEBIN occasionally intimidated reporters by following them in unmarked vehicles where SEBIN personnel would "watch their homes and offices, the public places like bakeries and restaurants, and would send them text messages to their cell phones".

Following the Narcosobrinos incident which saw President Maduro's nephews arrested in the United States for drug trafficking, Associated Press reporter Hannah Dreier, who had been awarded for her reporting on Venezuela, was detained by SEBIN agents in Sabaneta, Barinas. SEBIN agents threatened her during an interrogation, saying they would behead her like ISIL did to James Foley and said that they would let her go for a kiss. Finally, agents said that they wanted to coerce the United States to exchange Maduro's nephews for Dreier, accusing her of being a spy and sabotaging the Venezuelan economy.

=== Public surveillance ===
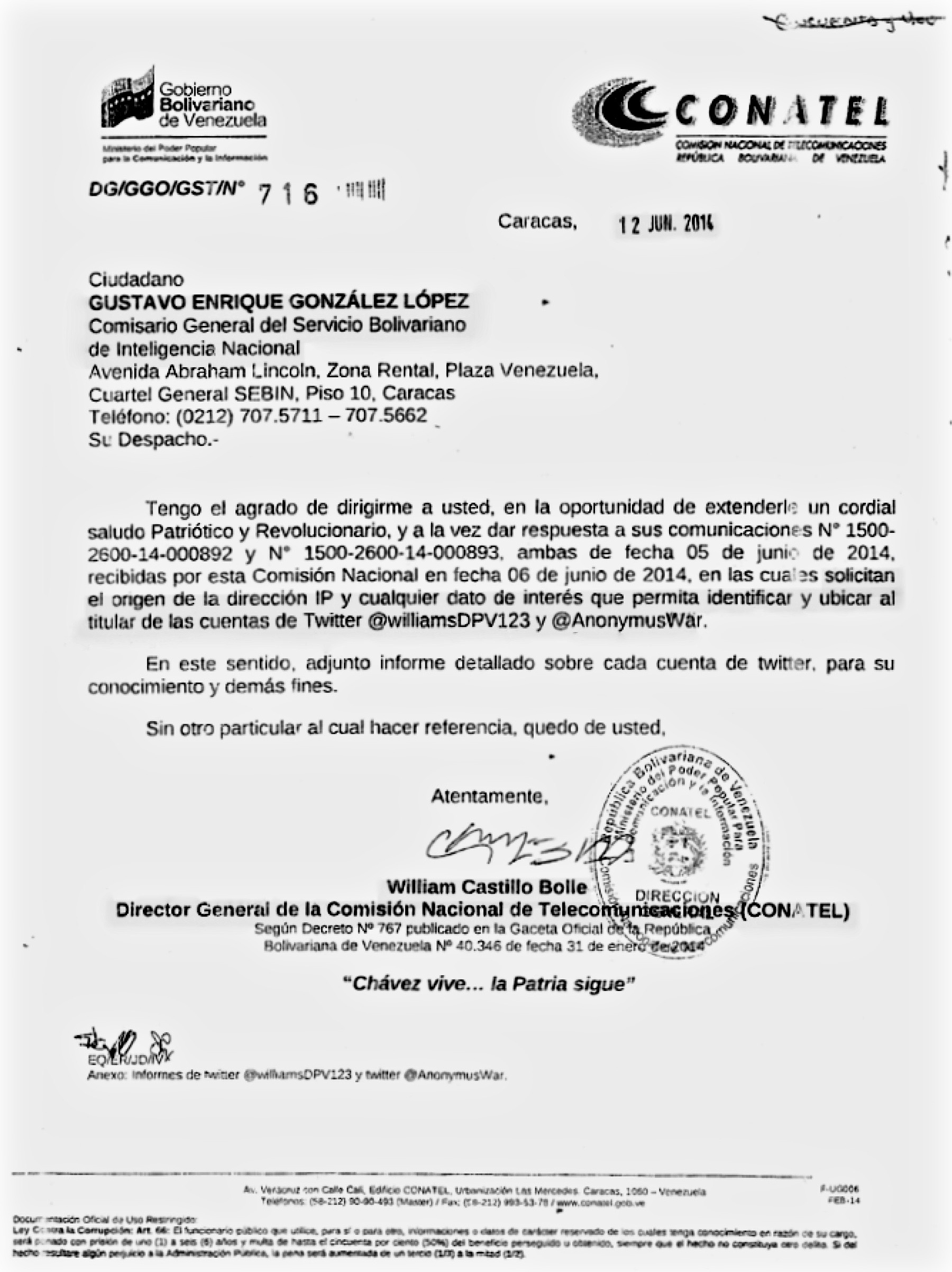
A communication from General Director of CONATEL, William Castillo Bolle, giving information on Venezuelan Twitter users to SEBIN General Commissioner Gustavo González López

In an El Nuevo Herald, former SEBIN officials and security experts state that the Venezuelan government has allegedly spent millions of dollars to spy on Venezuelans; using Italian and Russian technology to monitor emails, keywords and telephone conversations of its citizens; especially those who use the dominant, state-controlled telecommunications provider CANTV. Acquired information is used to create a "person of interest" for Venezuelan authorities, where only selected individuals could have been fully spied on and where a database had been created to monitor those who publicly disagreed with the Bolivarian Revolution.

In 2014, multiple Twitter users were arrested and faced prosecution due to the tweets they made. Alfredo Romero, executive director of the Venezuelan Penal Forum (FPV), stated that the arrests of Twitter users in Venezuela was a measure to instill fear among those using social media that were critical against the government. In October 2014, eight Venezuelans were arrested shortly after the death of PSUV official Robert Serra. Though the eight Venezuelans were arrested in October 2014, the Venezuelan government had been monitoring them since June 2014 according to leaked documents, with the state telecommunications agency Conatel providing IP addresses and other details to the Venezuelan intelligence agency SEBIN in order to arrest Twitter users.

==== Surveillance of Jewish community ====
In January 2013, 50 documents were leaked by Analisis24 showing that SEBIN had been collecting "private information on prominent Venezuelan Jews, local Jewish organizations and Israeli diplomats in Latin America". Some info that was gathered by SEBIN operations included office photos, home addresses, passport numbers and travel itineraries. The leaked documents were believed to be authentic according to multiple sources which included the Anti-Defamation League, that stated, "It is chilling to read reports that the SEBIN received instructions to carry out clandestine surveillance operations against members of the Jewish community".

=== Protest suppression ===
==== 2004 Venezuela recall protests ====
In March 2004, Amnesty International stated in a report following 2004 Venezuela recall protests that SEBIN (then DISIP) "allegedly used excessive force to control the situation on a number of occasions".

==== 2014 Venezuelan protests ====
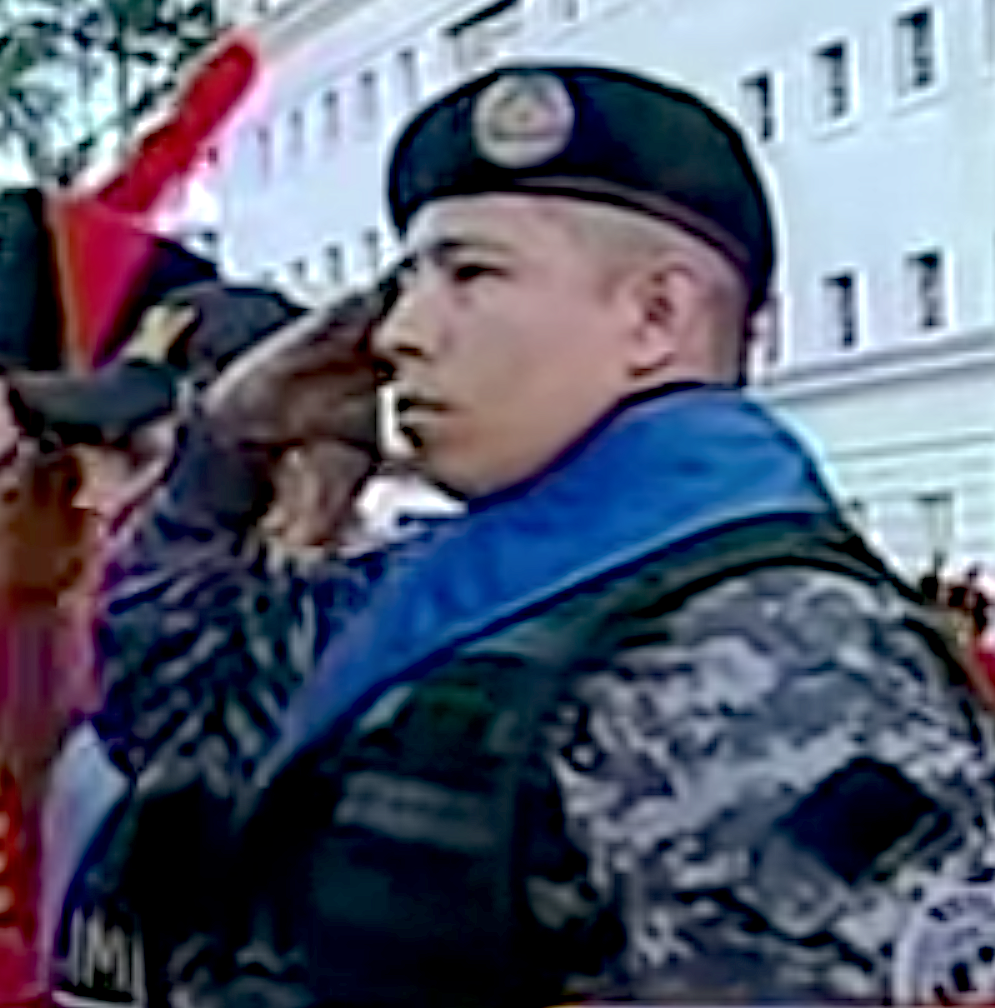
SEBIN agent at military ceremony in 2014

Seven SEBIN members caused the first deaths of the 2014 Venezuelan protests on 12 February 2014 after shooting at unarmed and fleeing protesters several times, in violation of protocol, which resulted in the deaths of Bassil Da Costa and Juan Montoya. Days later, on February 17, armed SEBIN agents raided the headquarters of Popular Will in Caracas and held individuals who were inside at gunpoint.

Following human rights violations by SEBIN during the protests, U.S. President Barack Obama used powers granted from the Venezuela Defense of Human Rights and Civil Society Act of 2014 and ordered the United States Department of the Treasury to freeze assets and property of the Director General of SEBIN, Gustavo Enrique González López and the former Director General, Manuel Gregorio Bernal Martínez.

=== Torture ===
Dubbed "La Tumba", or "The Tomb", by Venezuelan officials, political prisoners are held five stories underground of the SEBIN headquarters in inhumane conditions at freezing temperatures and with no ventilation, sanitation, or daylight. The cells are two by three meters that have a cement bed, security cameras and barred doors, with each cell aligned next to one another so there are no interactions between prisoners. Such conditions have caused prisoners to become very ill though they are denied medical treatment. Denounces of torture in "The Tomb", specifically white torture, are also common, with some prisoners attempting to commit suicide. Such conditions are to force prisoners to plead guilty to crimes they are accused of.

The torture of political prisoners has included the capture, mistreatment and in some cases killing of their pets.

A SEBIN former official told the Independent International Fact-Finding Mission on Venezuela that its director, Carlos Calderón, was directly involved in torture within the agency during the protests. Among other ill-treatment, he placed plastic bags on protesters, or poured water on them, and beat them to extract information.

== International actions ==
=== United States ===
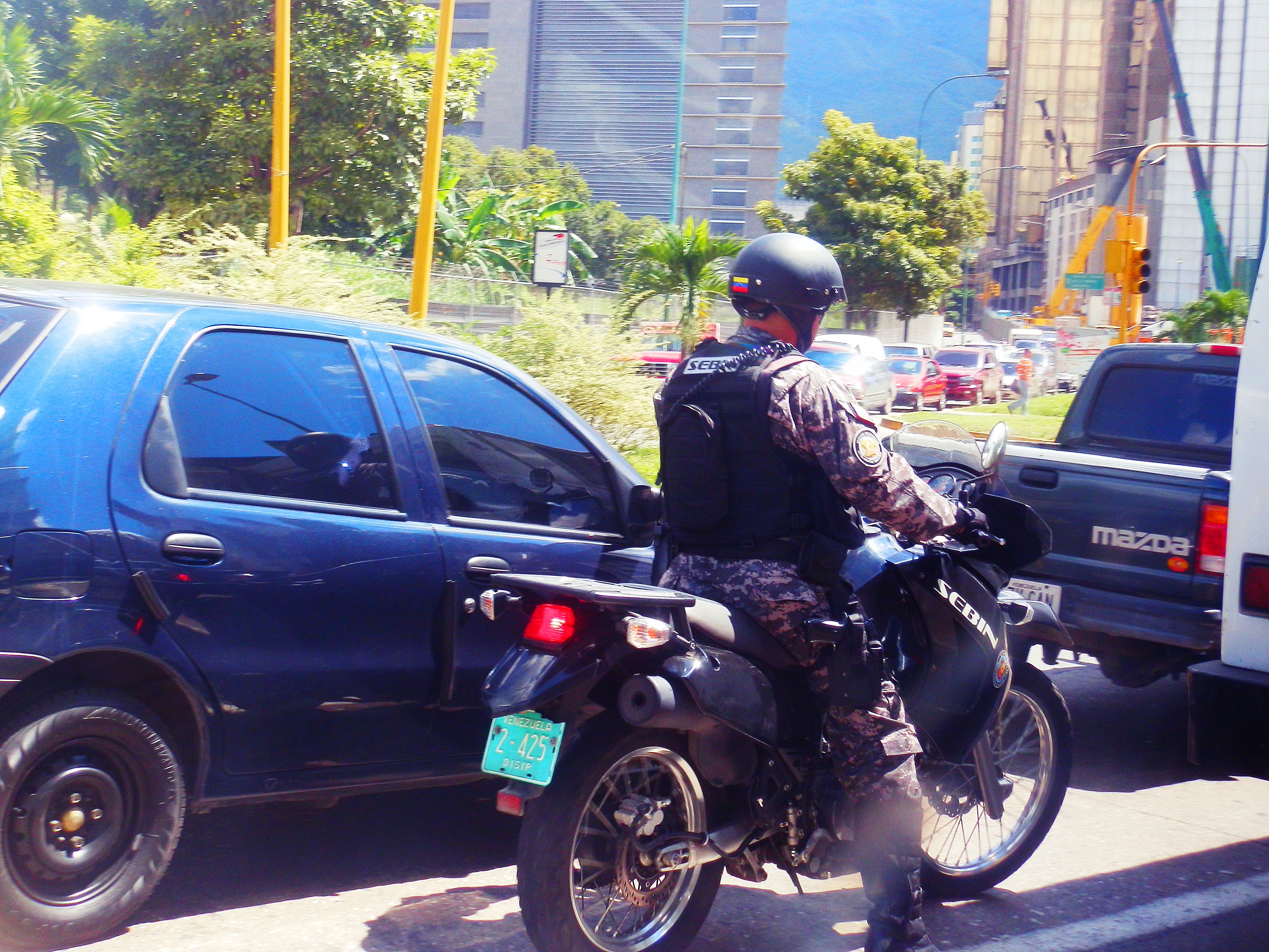
A SEBIN agent on a motorcycle in Caracas

In 2012, Livia Acosta Noguera and at least 10 other SEBIN agents that were allegedly operating under the guise of diplomatic missions left the United States following a controversy involving Acosta. In a Univision documentary, while Acosta was a cultural attaché in Mexico, she allegedly met with Mexican students posing as hackers that were supposedly planning to launch cyberattacks on the White House, the FBI, The Pentagon and several nuclear plants. After an FBI investigation and reactions from members of the United States congress, the United States Department of State declared Acosta persona non grata.

Despite the withdrawal of SEBIN agents, the government of Nicolás Maduro allegedly "maintains a network of spies in the United States, formed by supporters of the Bolivarian Revolution who are paid handsomely," according to former SEBIN officials. The former officials also stated that the contributions of "spies" is maintained by members of the "Patriotas Cooperantes" and from open source contributions, such as from press reports or information posted on websites. The Venezuelan government has used such tactics to reportedly observe government opposition organizations in the United States and has allegedly spied on United States government officials such as Cuban-American senator and representative Marco Rubio (R-FL) and Ileana Ros-Lehtinen (R-FL), respectively.

On 15 February 2019, General Director Manuel Cristopher Figuera was sanctioned by the United States for suspected human rights violations and torture. Following the Venezuelan uprising on 30 April 2019, the U.S. removed sanctions against Manuel Cristopher Figuera, who broke ranks with Maduro.

=== Chile ===
On February 21, 2024, SEBIN allegedly kidnapped the Venezuelan dissident and former army member Ronald Ojeda from his apartment in Santiago de Chile. Ojeda had received political asylum in Chile in 2023.

== Operations ==
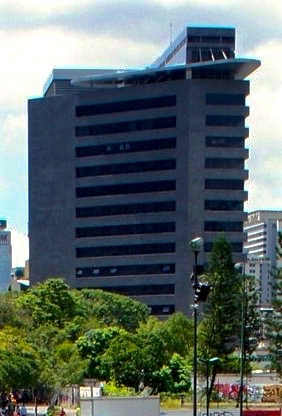
One of two headquarters of SEBIN, where La Tumba is located, in Caracas

SEBIN operates from two headquarters; El Helicoide the original headquarters of the agency. Its second and more updated facility at Plaza Venezuela, where La Tumba (The Tomb) is located.

This federal entity could be considered the only security agency in Venezuela that never participates in any direct involvement with the general public. SEBIN doesn't patrol the public roads, arrest civilians, or do regular law enforcement work like police departments and doesn't participate in any police raids, joint task forces, or operations not related to the ministry of interior and justice. It is an agency that combines their counterparts of the FBI, CIA, Secret Service, and US Marshal core work, such as counterterrorism, intelligence, counterintelligence, government investigations, and background investigations and provides protection/escort for high-ranking government officials, among other federally mandated duties. Officers of this agency are rarely seen in public wearing their full black uniforms; they can be seen providing protection within a few federal buildings throughout the country.
