= Karen Palacios =

Venezuelan clarinetist

- Born: Karen Palacios Pérez
- Occupation: Clarinetist

Karen Palacios Pérez is a Venezuelan clarinetist who was part of the National System of Orchestras and the National Philharmonic of Venezuela. Palacios had her contract with the Philharmonic Orchestra canceled for having signed in the recall referendum organized by the opposition led National Assembly in 2017 and later detained for denouncing it on her Twitter account. Palacios was released on 16 July 2019.

== Career ==
Palacios was a student at the Pedagogical Institute of Caracas and developed her career from the age of 11 in the National System of Orchestras and as a member of the National Philharmonic of Venezuela. In 2017, Karen signed in favor of the referendum organized by the opposition led National Assembly; she was later notified that her contract with the Philharmonic Orchestra was canceled because her political position was not convenient for the orchestra. Palacios denounced the incident on her Twitter account and it went viral. Later, she participated in the Chúo Torrealba program and was interviewed in El Nacional. The clarinetist started to receive attacks and threats on social networks and during that year's protests her tweets began to be cited, where she expressed anger at the situation and at the abuse of the security forces, being accused of instigating violence.

== Detention ==
On 1 June 2019, Palacios was detained by officials from the Directorate General of Military Counterintelligence (DGCIM) at her residence in Carrizal, Miranda state. According to her relatives, the officials posed as teachers of the orchestra and told her that they would take her to the Victim Attention Center, located in the Miraflores presidential palace, and she was accompanied by her mother. Once in the vehicle, she was informed that she would be detained at the DGCIM headquarters in Boleíta, "for inquiries." Karen was held in a windowless basement cell and only two bunkbeds, along with nine other women. Bright white lights were kept turned on in the cell, preventing the detainees from sleep, and the room temperature was kept very low, which worsened her asthma. The first day she was detained, officers pushed her to the ground. Another day, DGCIM officers lied to Palacios telling her grandmother had died, that her mother blamed her for the death and did not want see Karen again. In fact, her mother went to Boleita every day, but was never allowed to see her daughter.

Palacios was charged with the crime of incitement for tweeting that she dreamed of President Nicolás Maduro's death and was detained in the National Institute for Female Orientation (INOF), in Los Teques, Miranda state, and was placed in a cell with common criminals, despite having a release order dated from 18 June. In court, her mother was asked not to make her daughter's case public because "it was going to be resolved soon." A month later, the defense of the clarinetist was assumed by the pro bono NGO Foro Penal.

Palacios was released on 16 July 2019.

== See also ==
- Killing of Armando Cañizales
- Inés González Árraga
- Cassandra case
- Braulio Jatar
- Political prisoners in Venezuela
