= Pablo Hasél =

Spanish rapper

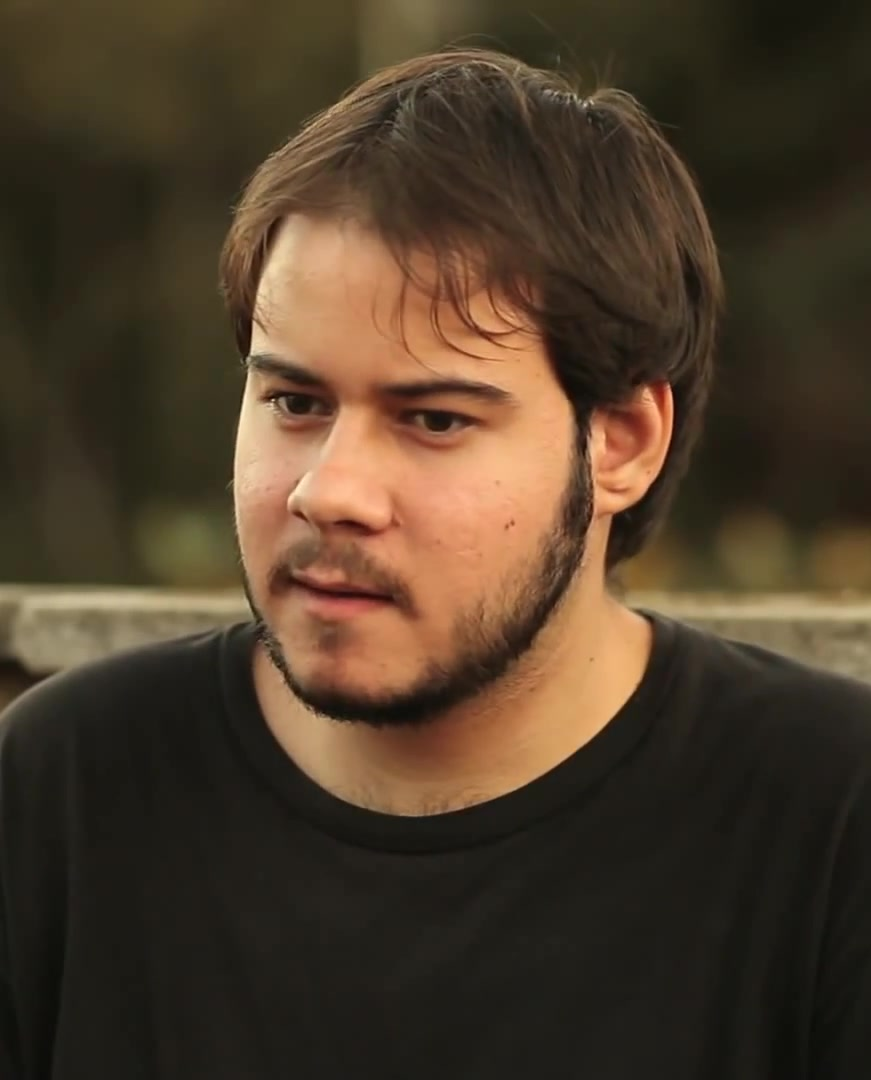
- Hasél in 2011
- Born: Pablo Rivadulla Duró; 9 August 1988 (age 38); Lleida, Catalonia, Spain
- Other names: Pau Rivadulla i Duró; Hasél
- Occupations: Rapper; political activist
- Years active: 2005–present
- Criminal charges: Assault; praising terrorism and terrorist groups; threats; obstruction of justice
- Criminal penalty: 2 years, 6 months in prison
- Criminal status: Currently in prison
- Website: Official website

Pablo Rivadulla Duró (born 9 August 1988), known artistically as Pablo Hasél, is a Catalan rapper, writer, poet, and political activist. His songs and actions, often controversial and in support of far-left politics, have led to a number of criminal charges and convictions in his country. In June 2020 he was sentenced to six months in prison for pushing and spraying washing-up liquid at a TV3 journalist and to two and a half years for kicking and threatening a witness in the trial of a policeman. He was imprisoned on 16 February 2021 on a nine-month sentence for recidivism in insulting the Spanish monarchy, insulting the Spanish army and police forces, and praising terrorism and banned groups. This has been labeled an attack on free speech by certain groups both in Spain and overseas, including Amnesty International, and led to numerous protests and riots.

== Name ==
Hasél's official name is Pablo Rivadulla Duró (pronounced [ˈpaβlo riβaˈðuʎa ðuˈɾo]). However, some newspapers render his first name as Pau (pronounced [paw]), the equivalent Catalan language to the Spanish language Pablo (in English, Paul), and some include the conjunction "i" between his surnames as sometimes is the custom in Catalan, yielding Pau Rivadulla i Duró. He initially used the pseudonym Hasél, in reference to a revolutionary character in an Arabic short story, before later adopting Pablo Hasél as his artistic name.

== Biography ==
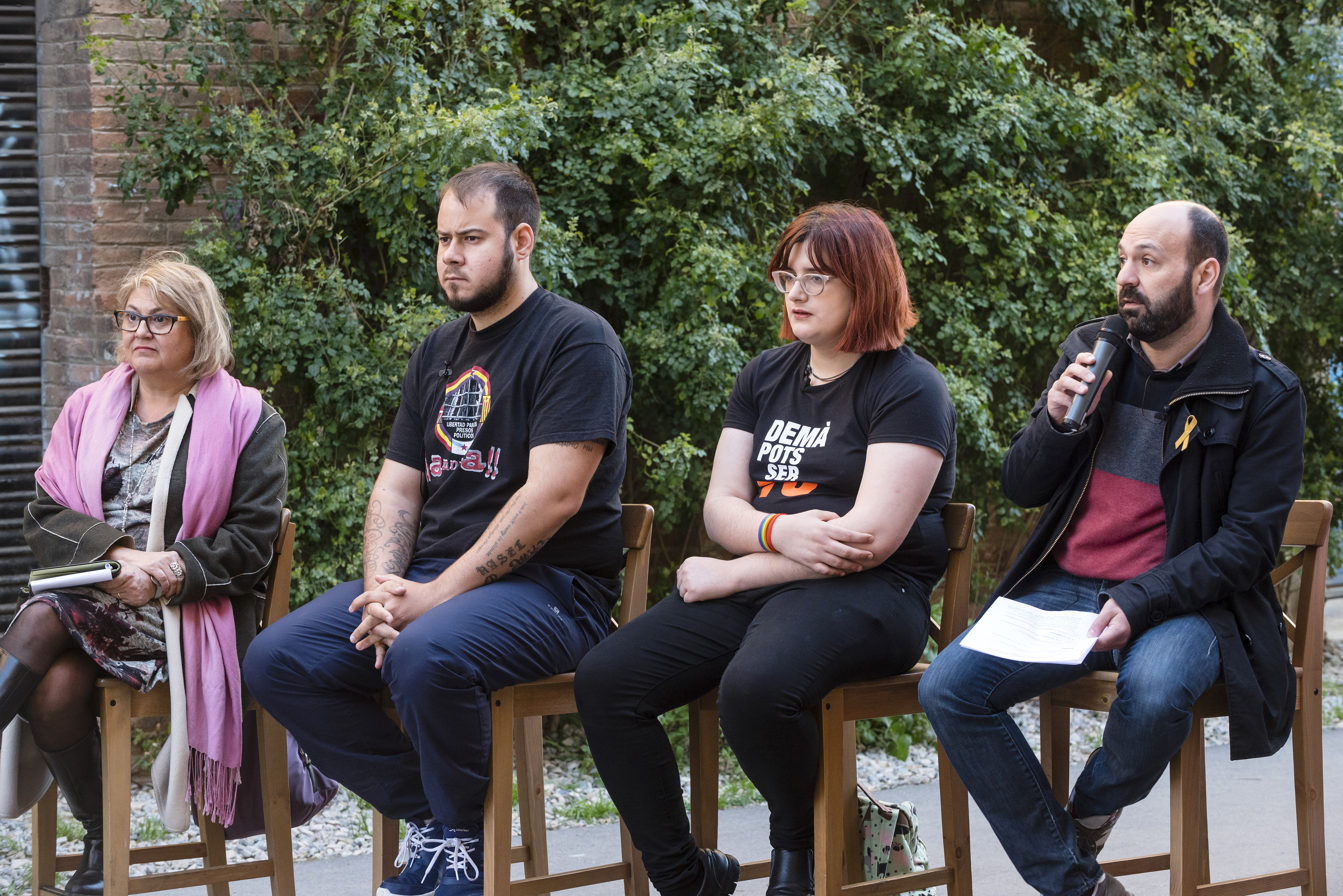
Journalist at the Catalunya Ràdio Mercè Alcocer, Pablo Hasél, Cassandra Vera and Marcel Mauri de los Ríos in 2018 at ″Llibertats en perill?″, an event organised by Omnium Cultural, inside the framework of their campaign "Demà pots ser tu / Mañana puedes ser tú / Tomorrow it could be you", a campaign whose goal is to reflect on attacks on free speech.

Hasél was born in Lleida, Catalonia on 9 August 1988 to Ignacio Rivadulla and Paloma Duró. Hasél's father was a businessman and the president of the local football club Unió Esportiva Lleida and his mother came from an upper-class family of lawyers. Hasél's paternal grandfather was, Andrés Rivadulla Buira, a lieutenant in Franco's army, known for fighting the Maquis (anti-Franco resistance guerrillas that also collaborated in exile with the French resistance) in the invasion of Val d'Aran.

=== Music ===
Hasél began his musical career in 2006 as a rapper. His lyrics concentrated on social and anti-capitalist criticism.

=== Legal troubles ===
In October 2011, Hasél was arrested and bailed for a song titled Democracia, su puta madre in which he praised Manuel Pérez Martínez "Camarada Arenas", the former secretary general of the PCE(r), who was sentenced to 17 years in prison for belonging to the terrorist group GRAPO. In April 2014, Hasél was given a two-year prison sentence for the lyrics of ten songs in praise of GRAPO, ETA, Al-Qaeda the Red Army Faction and Terra Lliure, and threats against leading politicians like José Bono or Patxi Lopez.

The Audiencia Nacional court suspended his entry into prison for three years in September 2019, on condition that he not reoffend, since the sentence was less than two years. Hasél violated this condition by continuing to sing and tweet. Hasél has denied that he supports Al-Qaeda or that it was listed among the groups he was charged with supporting.

In May 2014, Hasél was arrested for being part of a group of around fifteen people that attacked a stall belonging to the Lleida Identitària, linked to the far-right Platform for Catalonia (PxC) party.

In November 2014, Hasél released a song called "Menti-ros" which included several depictions of shooting, stabbing or bombing the mayor of Lleida, Àngel Ros. He was charged with making threats. In February 2017 he was convicted of disrespecting authority, after the court concluded that the song did not meet the legal definition of a threat. He was fined €530.

In June 2016, Hasél pushed, insulted and sprayed washing-up liquid at a TV3 journalist. He received six months in prison and a fine of €12,150 in June 2020. A few days after the court ruling and as a result of it, a group of unknown individuals attacked the headquarters of TV3 in Lleida. In the same month, he received a 2 1/2-year sentence and €2,500 fine for assault and obstruction of justice, namely for kicking and threatening a witness in the October 2017 trial of a policeman eventually acquitted of assaulting a minor, accusing him of providing false testimony. This sentence was confirmed in 2021, days after his imprisonment.

In a February 2018 interview, Hasél defended his support of the Catalan Republic, and developed his position on free speech: "I will not be a hypocrite, I do not defend freedom of expression in the abstract. I do not defend the freedom of expression of a pedophile or a Nazi to say that homosexuals should be killed. Precisely, I fight against that. [...] I stand for freedom of expression to fight for democratic rights." Later on, in another interview, in March 2018 Hasél said he was unable to find work due to his criminal convictions that disqualified him from the public sector for ten years, and that his last work had been grape picking in France.

In March 2018, Hasél was convicted by Spanish Special Court Audiencia Nacional in Madrid to a two-year prison sentence and a fine of €24,300 for insulting and slandering the Crown and using the King's image (for which he was ordered to pay a fine), for insulting and slandering State institutions (for which he was also ordered to pay a fine); and for the offence of glorification of terrorism, being aggravated because it was a repeat offence, for which he was sentenced to seven months imprisonment in one song lyrics and in 64 tweets. The song was titled Juan Carlos el Bobón, which roughly translates as Juan Carlos the Clown, a wordplay on the former king's actual name, Juan Carlos de Borbón. In the song, Hasél recounts the former king's numerous scandals in a chronological order. Many of his 64 incriminated tweets were actually about police violence and a lack of accountability in that area. In one of those tweets used in the court case Hasél wrote that Joseba Arregi Izagirre, a 1981 accused ETA member, was tortured to death in a Madrid prison; pointing out this fact was part of the evidence used to claim he supported terrorism. An appeals judge later reduced his jail term to nine months and one day because his social media remarks did "not pose a real risk" to anyone. This decision was ultimately upheld by the Supreme Court of Spain in May 2020; both rulings were hugely controversial rulings.

One of the judges of the Spanish Special Court Audiencia Nacional in Madrid who sentenced Hasél was Nicolás Poveda Peña, who was an active member of the fascist Falange, the political movement of dictator Franco, and ran for election on the lists of the Falange Party - Poveda was appointed judge by the fourth turn, that is, without going through the process of competing for the position.

On 28 January 2021, Hasél was ordered to voluntarily enter prison within ten days to serve the nine-month and one day sentence. The order was made public by the artist himself. On the same day the President of the European Court of Human Rights (ECHR) in Strasbourg, Róbert Ragnar Spanó, issued a warning to Spain that the Strasbourg doctrine on the rights in cases of criticism of ″public personas″ is ″clear″, quoting from two other Spanish cases where the ECHR ruled that Spanish sentences had been disproportionately harsh. Spanó explained that "public office holders, ministers, kings – because of the public nature of their functions – must accept wider ranges of criticism".

On 6 February a thousand people gathered in the Plaza Jacinto Benavente in Madrid in solidarity with Hasél and in defence of freedom of expression and conscience with dozens of riot police vans and police armed with rifles in front of the gathering. On 12 February 2021, the day of his deadline to go to prison, Hasél released the song, Ni Felipe VI, ironically dedicating it to "the misnamed progressive [PSOE-Podemos] government which has perpetuated repression. Feeling nervous as the streets fill up for freedom of expression, they have promised to do something, trying to stop the mobilisation, but only with this will we win this struggle". The song begins with an intervention by the Spanish king Felipe VI in which he states that "without freedom of expression and information there is no democracy". Within the first month the song had 1.5 million views on Youtube.

Hasél publicly refused this prison order, and was eventually arrested on 16 February. Hasel, alongside a group of over 50 students, had barricaded himself inside University of Lleida's rectorate building in protest against his sentence. Hasél's freedom was supported by Amnesty International and a letter signed by 300 Spanish artists including Pedro Almodóvar and Javier Bardem, as well as by President of Mexico Andrés Manuel López Obrador, former Bolivian President Evo Morales and Venezuela's president Nicolás Maduro. Hasél's imprisonment led to nights of protests involving thousands of people in cities including Valencia, Madrid and Barcelona. Podemos has likened Hasél's case to that of Valtònyc, another Spanish rapper prosecuted by the Spanish judiciary, who fled to Belgium in 2018 after a 3 1/2-year prison sentence for writing song lyrics that a court found glorified terrorism and insulted the monarchy. PEN Català published a communiqué – in collaboration with the Catalan Academy of Music, the Association of Catalan Language Writers, the Association of Periodicals in Catalan, Editors.cat, the Fira Literal, Freemuse, the Catalan Publishers' Guild, Llegir en català, Òmnium; in defense of freedom of expression and for the release of Hasél.

On 1 March 2021, the public prosecutor's office asked for another five years and three months in prison for Hasél, for incidents that took place on the night of 25 March 2018 in the attempted assault on the Government subdelegation in Lleida in protest against the arrest of Carles Puigdemont a few hours earlier in Germany. Hasél and 10 defendants had the intention, according to the Public Prosecutor's Office, to disrupt the protection operation and "gain access to the building", a symbol of the central government in Lleida. The State Attorney's Office is involved in the case to claim compensation for the material damage, while the Generalitat de Catalunya brought no action against Hasél.

On 22 March 2021 the Council published the Commissioner for Human Rights, (Dunja Mijatović), letter addressed to the Minister of Justice of Spain. It stated that – in addition to the lack of legal clarity – Spanish courts in Madrid had not explained in such cases whether the denounced "glorification of terrorism really entailed the risk of a real, concrete and immediate danger". Only then could anti-terror legislation be used to restrict freedom of expression. With regard to the allegations of lèse-majesté, it stressed that the possibilities for restricting freedom of expression here were very limited, "especially when it comes to politicians, public officials and other public figures". It called for "comprehensive" legislative changes to strengthen freedom of expression in line with the European Convention on Human Rights. And the European Commission for Democracy through Law (Venice Commission) also requested Spain to reform its Law on Citizen Security of 2015 because of its repressive potential.

In November 2023, the European Court of Human Rights declined Pablo Hasél's application against Spain, stating that it considered his conviction to be proportional, based on relevant and strong enough grounds and addressing a pressing social need. Among other arguments, the institution pointed out that his committal to prison was because of his consecutive sentences and that he had just been sentenced to a fine for his statements regarding Juan Carlos I. The ECHR also justified its ruling by stating that unlike some other defendants whose sentencing by Spanish courts it had criticised previously, Hasél, when making critical statements about the monarchy and police, had not been a representative of a political party but merely a singer and had had time to consider his utterances rather than speaking on the spur of the moment; he had also not included evidence for his positions in the tweets and the songs. The Columbia Global Freedom of Expression academic initiative commented that with this ruling, "the Court contracts its own previously established broad scope of protection for political speech in this area" and goes against its own statements in earlier rulings that states should "restrain in the use of criminal proceedings against criticism of political institutions" and use prison sentences as punishment for political speech "only in exceptional circumstances".

=== Protests ===
In the days and weeks after his arrest, a wave of protests occurred in cities across Catalonia and the rest of Spain. Damages in Barcelona were estimated at €1.5 million. Violence was reported in several cities. Nearly 200 people were detained, 200 injured, a Reuters-journalist and a 19-year-old woman, who lost an eye, were among those when agents from the Mossos d'Esquadra fired foam bullets into the crowd. On 1 March, a group of elderly people chained themselves to the Paeria palace, Lleida's town hall, demanding "an end to the repression of young people" and that agents responsible for wrongful actions be dismissed from the Mossos d'Esquadra.

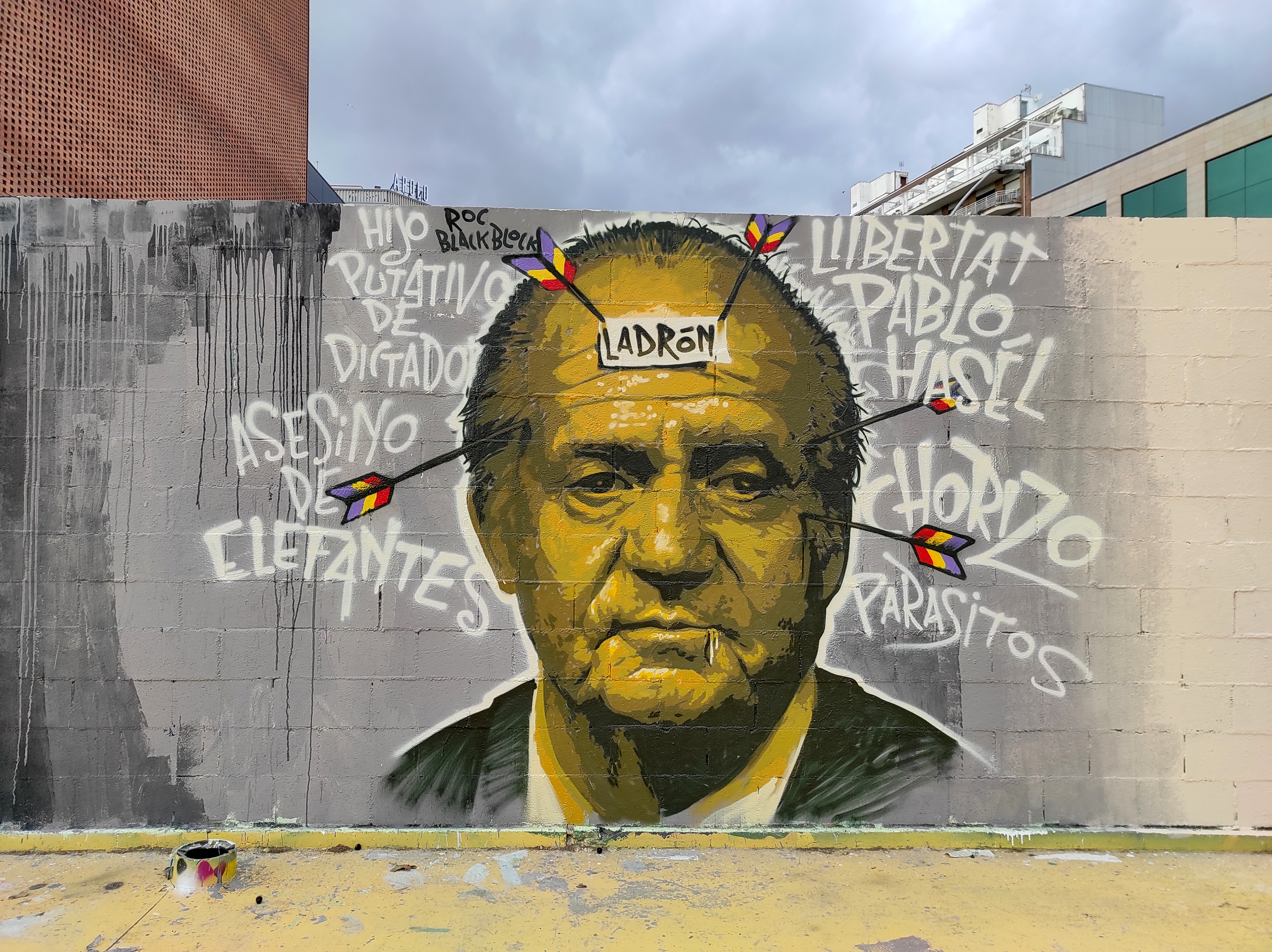
Political mural by Roc Blackblock in support of Hasél at the Jardins de les Tres Xemeneies – an area designed for urban art in Barcelona. It showed an image of Juan Carlos with the word ladrón (thief) pinned to his head. Words describing him as an elephant killer and the son of a dictator surrounded the portrait. It was destroyed in February 2021 on the orders of the Barcelona police. The city council later apologised for its destruction.

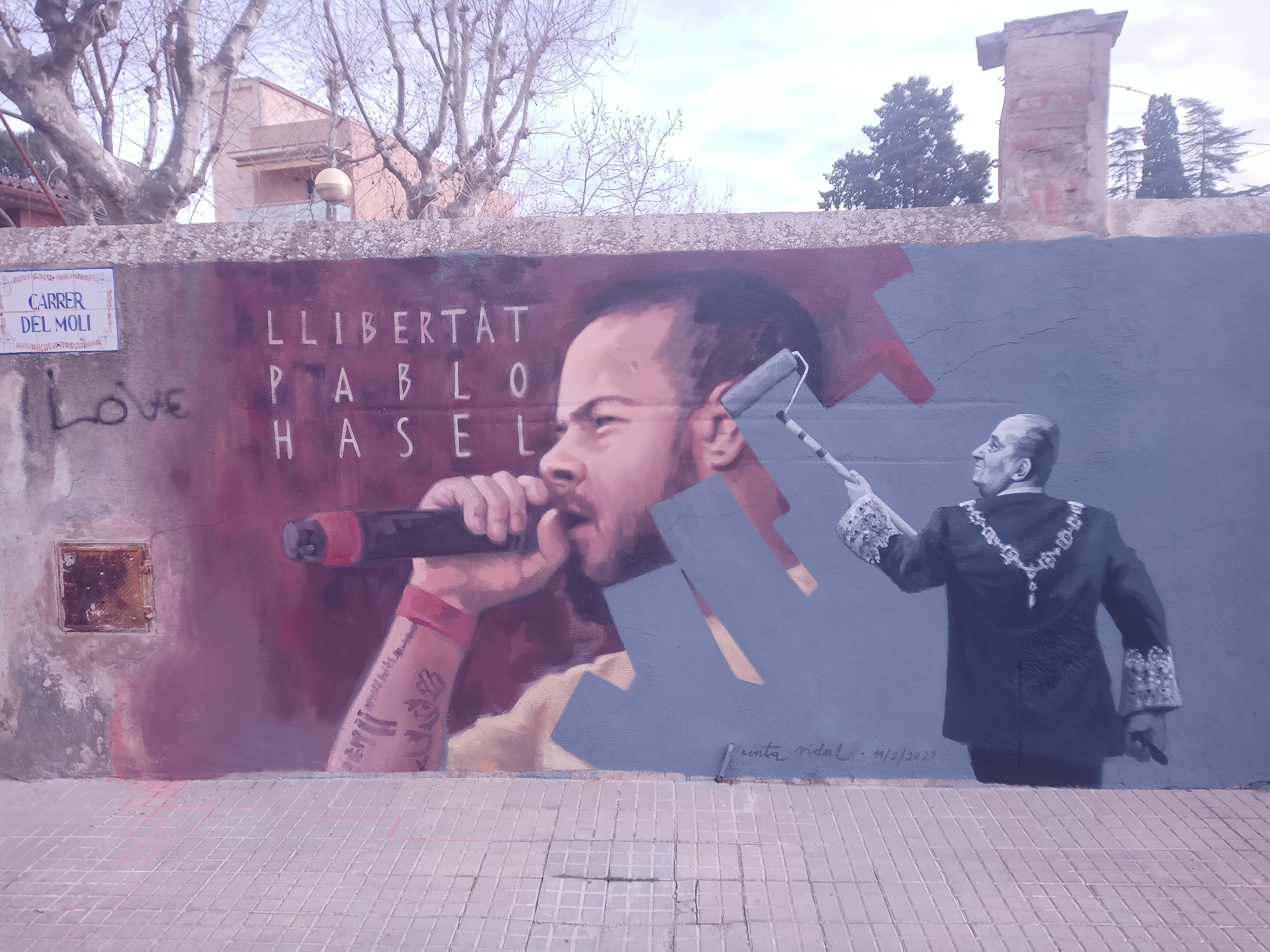
Political mural by Catalan artist Cinta Vidal Llibertat Pablo Hasel ("Free Pablo Hasel" in Catalan) in Cardedeu, created following the destruction of the former. It shows Juan Carlos painting over the image of Pablo Hasel with a bland grey colour.

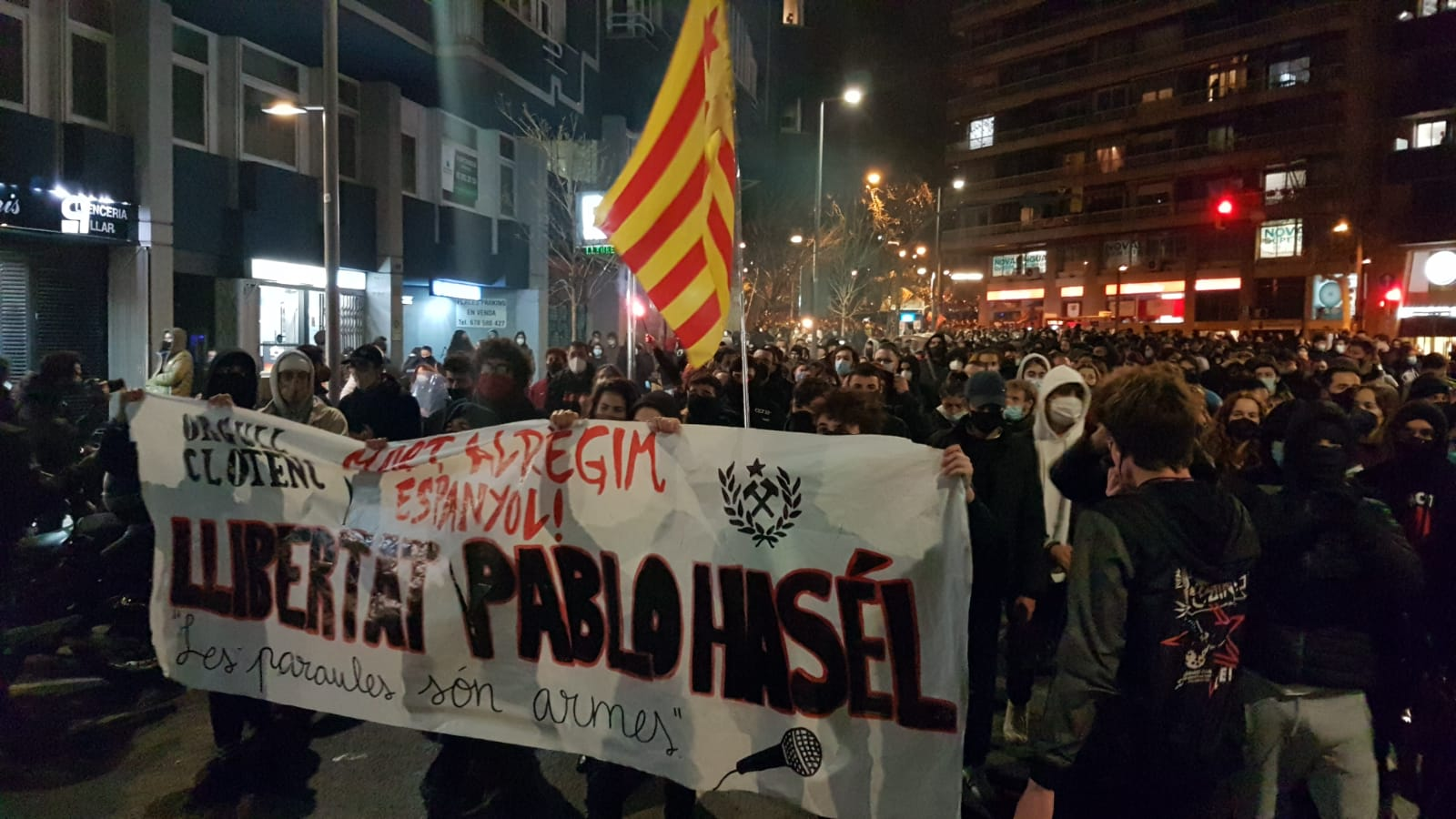
Demonstration in Barcelona on 16 February 2021 against Hasél's incarceration. The banner reads Llibertat Pablo Hasel – Les paraules són armes ("Free Pablo Hasel – Words are weapons" in Catalan)

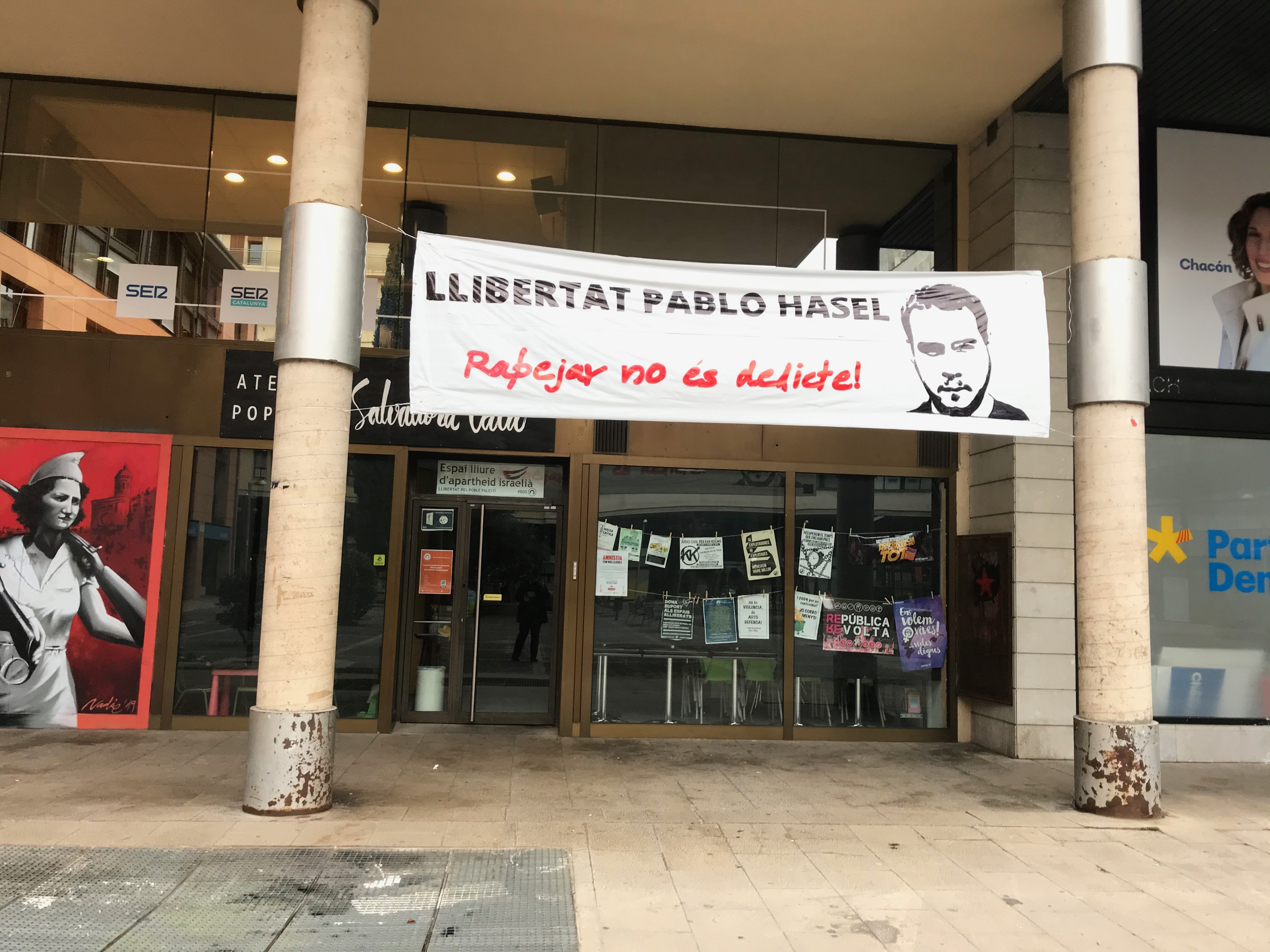
Banner in Girona in support of Pablo Hasél. It reads Llibertat Pablo Hasel – rapejar no és delicte! ("Free Pablo Hasel- To rap is not a crime!" in Catalan)

== Discography ==
=== Solo ===
- Esto no es el paraíso (2005)
- Miedo y asco en Ilerda – Re-released under the title Ilerda rima con mierda (2007)
- Trastorno Tripolar (2007)
- Desde el abismo se goza de las mejores vistas (2008)
- No me joda doctor (2008)
- Recital de ideales/No me joda Doctor (2008)
- En ningún lugar pero aquí (2008)
- Descuartizando resacas (2009)
- Quemando la vida (with Kaktan) (2009)
- Cuando el tiempo no nos tocaba las ilusiones (2009)
- Se lo vomite al viento mientras ella se drogaba con otro (2010)
- Inéditas por culpa de Aileen Wuornos (2010)
- Banquete de larvas (2010)
- Siempre perdidos 1 (2010)
- Siempre perdidos 2 (2010)
- El Che disparaba (2011)
- Solos en medio del misterio infinito (2011)
- Polvo y ceniza (2011)
- Un café con Gudrun Ensslin (2011)
- El infierno sería verlos más allá (2011)
- Crucificado en tu clítoris (2011)
- Besos cortados con coca (2011)
- Canciones supervivientes al registro policial (2012)
- La tortura placentera de la luna: algunas canciones inéditas (2012)
- Escribiendo con Ulrike Meinhof (2012)
- Empezar de bajo 0: Algunos poemas grabados (2012)
- La noche que supe que hay laberintos sin salida (2012)
- Poemas de presos políticos comunistas (2012)
- Los gusanos nunca volarán (inéditas) (2012)
- La muerte nos obligó a vivir (2012)
- Sigue desnudándose la dictadura del capital (2013)
- Por mera supervivencia (inéditas) (2013)
- Por mera supervivencia II (inéditas) (2013)
- Por mera supervivencia III (inéditas) (2013)
- Exprimiendo el corazón (inéditas) (2013)
- Tarde o temprano Venceremos (2014)
- Mientras me asesina el tiempo (inéditas) (2014)
- Por escapar de la oscuridad (inéditas) (2014)
- A Orillas Del Segre (2014)
- Cafeína e imaginación (inéditas) (2015)
- Burlando al dolor (2015)
- Boicot Activo (2015)
- Hasta el fin de mis días (2015)
- Resistir hasta vencer (2016)
- Esto ya ni desahoga (inéditas) (2016)
- Fuerte fragilidad (2017)
- Perdidos en el infinito (with Nyto Rukeli) (2017)
- El interrogatorio del atardecer (2018)
- La voz no puede encerrarse (2018)
- Ha llovido mucho (2019)
- Semillas de libertad (2019)
- Haciéndome la autopsia (2020)
- La inmolación de las entrañas (2020)
- Canciones para la revuelta y la soledad (2020)
- ¡Hay que pararlos! (2021)

=== Prozaks (feat. Cíniko) ===
- Recital de ideales/No me joda Doctor (2008)
- A Orillas Del Segre (2014)

=== Magmah (feat. Zyon Revol "Frankie Brown" ) ===
- En ningún lugar pero aquí (2008)

=== Las resakas (feat. Marc Hijo de Sam) ===
- Las resakas: Besos cortados con coca (2011)
- La muerte nos obligó a vivir (2012)

=== Collaborations ===
- Ciniko: Rabia (La teoría del nada, 2007)
- Zwit: Violé a mis monstruos
- Rekiêm: Insomnio dicta (Amaneciendo en persia, 2011)
- Be timeless: La muerte en cada partícula (Sencillo y en silencio, 2011)
- Charly efe: Follando como perros (Sra. Muerte pase usted primero, 2011)
- shakymc: Compositor de varios temas (Joel Murillo, 2009–2012)
- The Gulaggers: Whiskey & nachos
- Gorka: Señalando obstáculos (Con Pipe Díaz, 2013)
- Los Chikos del Maíz: Los hijos de Iván Drago (Pasión de Talibanes, 2011)
- RPG-7: Pásate (En tu ciudad, 2012)
- H.Kanino: Vidas al límite (Con Ozhe, 2013)
- Pipe Díaz: El eco de los disparos
- Pipe Díaz: Jódete Burgués
- El Invikto: Insomnio e Imaginación
- Valtònyc: Lo Que La Represión No Puede Frenar
- Saúl Zaitsev and Pipe Díaz: Somos
- Saúl Zaitsev: Otro Paso
- Arma X: Los Nietos De Stalin
- Nyto: Anticapitalismo o Barbarie
- Siker: Trabajos Forzados
- Cíniko: Sublévate
- Cíniko: Menti ros (dedicated to Angel Ros)
- Boot Boys: Hostiles Torbellinos
- Elisa: Siempre Vivirán
- ARS MORIS and Cíniko: Rojo remedio (2018)
- Koro: Parásitos (2020)
- Konorte: Askatasun Haziak (2020)
- Eshoj Ekirne: Seguimos firmes (2020)
- Mara: Sua eta Harria (2020)
- Luis Díaz: Internacionalismo (2020)
- Teko: Traga (2020)

== Poetry and books ==
Hasél has authored the following collections of poems and books, often in collaboration with Spanish poet Aitor Cuervo.

- Dos canallas a sueldo de La Habana (collection of poems, with Cuervo)
- Acerca del amor – Manuel Pérez Martínez (Arenas) (collection of poems, reedited with Cuervo)
- Derritiendo Icebergs (collection of poems, with Cuervo)
- Veinte poemas de odio y dos corazones descuartizados (collection of poems, with Cuervo)
- Con la solidaridad por bandera (collection of poems, with Cuervo, September 2012)
- Follarnos mientras ejecutan un banquero (collection of poems)
- Más que cifras (collection of poems)
- De la ansiedad a la esperanza (collection of poems)
- La violencia de las injusticias (book)
- Más allá del polvo (collection of poems)
- La resaca de vivir (collection of poems)

== Documentary ==
- Hasél: Poeta Proscrito, 58:05 min., 2021. Director: Nikone Cons, Nikone Cons's Youtube-Channel
