= Protests against the imprisonment of Pablo Hasél =

Riots caused by the arrest of a Spanish rapper

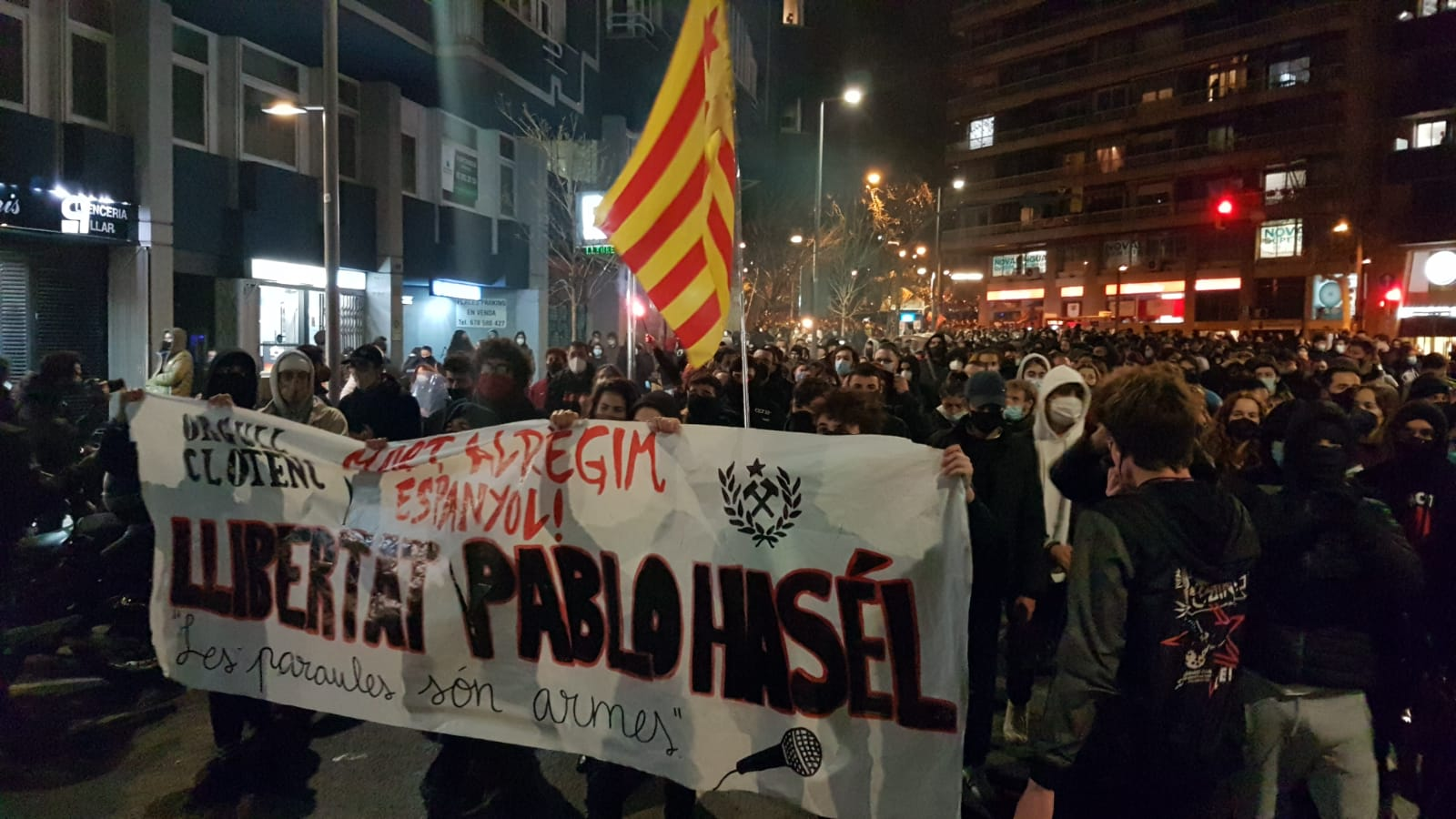
- Barcelona, 16 February 2021
- Date: 16 February 2021 – 27 February 2021
- Location: Barcelona (principal), Girona, Lleida, Tarragona, Vic, Vilanova i la Geltrú, Sabadell, Terrassa, Vilafranca del Penedès, Madrid, Valencia, Bilbao
- Caused by: Triggered by the imprisonment of Pablo Hasél for two final sentences for glorifying terrorism, Lèse-majesté and insulting state institutions.

Casualties
- Injuries: 220 (129 protesters and 91 Catalan police officers)
- Arrested: 170
- Damage: looting, Vic police station assaulted, fire on Barcelona police van, hundreds of containers and vehicles burned, €1.5M (Barcelona, 22 February), €200,000 (Madrid, 20 February)

On 16 February 2021, the Spanish rapper Pablo Hasél was arrested and imprisoned in his hometown of Lleida, Spain for two final sentences by order of the Spanish Audiencia Nacional in Madrid: a 2-year prison sentence for glorification of terrorism in his songs and a second sentence of 9 months in prison for glorification of terrorism in a song and several tweets, as well as a fine of 10,800 euros for Lèse-majesté and another of 6,750 euros for insulting state institutions, which add up to days in prison for each instalment he fails to pay. His imprisonment sparked a wave of protests and has coincided with the government's announcement of a reform of crimes related to freedom of expression.

Starting from that night, supporters protested in several cities across Spain, with some protests involving violence and property damage. The protests caused rifts in Spain's coalition government, between PSOE members supportive of the police, and Podemos members supportive of protests.

== Protests ==
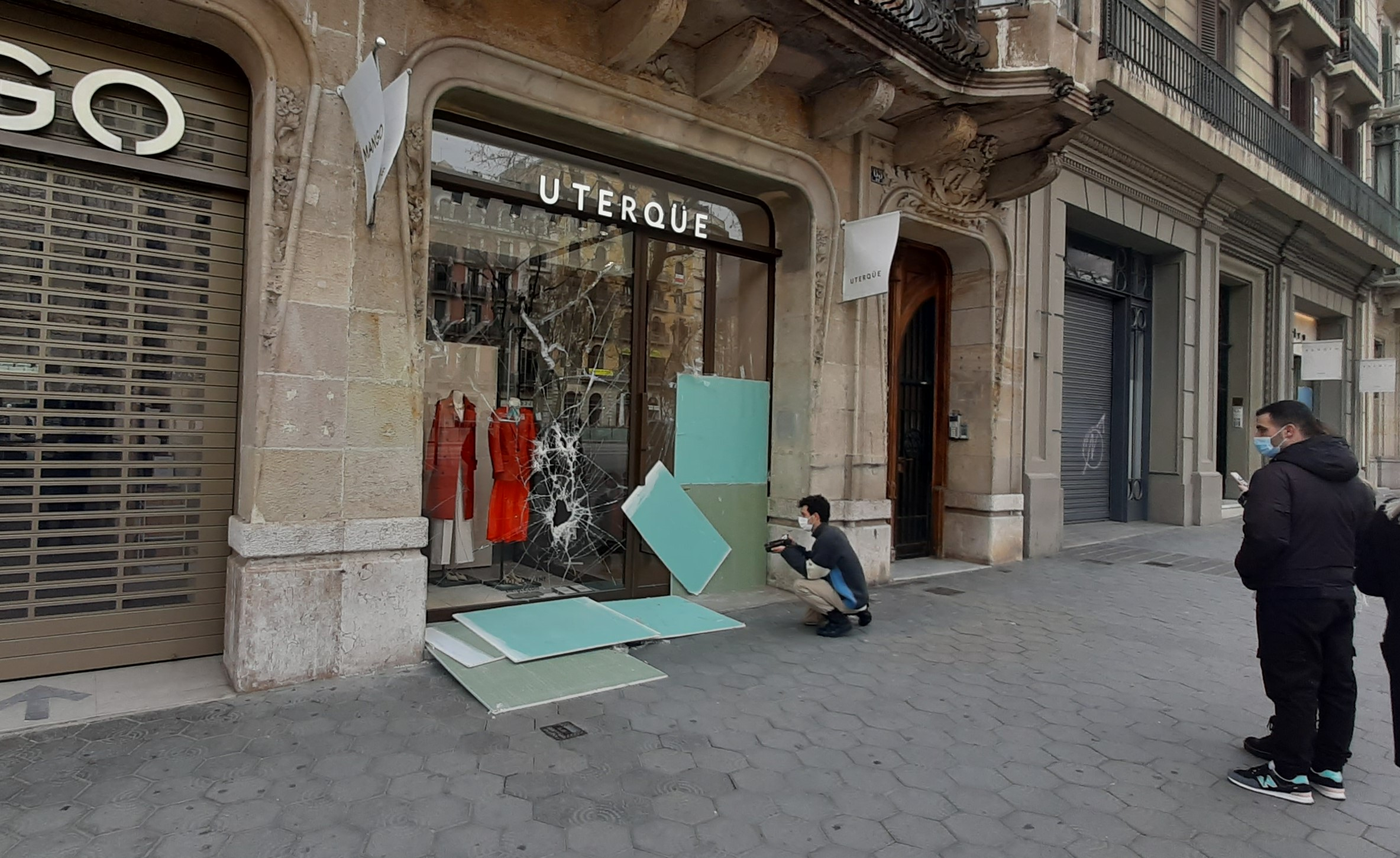
Broken display windows after the riots.

In Barcelona, the capital of Catalonia, looting occurred at banks and businesses. A female protester in the city lost an eye from a foam bullet fired by the Mossos d'Esquadra, the police force of Catalonia. Violent unrest occurred in other Catalan cities, including Hasél's hometown of Lleida, as well as Vic, Girona and Reus.

Outside of Catalonia, violence was reported at the Puerta del Sol in Madrid, Valencia and Bilbao. The mayor of Madrid, José Luis Martínez-Almeida, reported damages of €200,000.

== Reactions ==
Barcelona's mayor Ada Colau, of En Comú Podem, condemned all violence and voiced support for the police. This position was questioned by Dolors Sabater, a Popular Unity Candidacy member of the Parliament of Catalonia. Almeida in Madrid acted in favour of the police, while mayor Joan Ribó in Valencia criticised the police response as disproportionate.

Spain's prime minister Pedro Sánchez said "in a full democracy like Spain, violence is inadmissible...violence is a denial of democracy". The second deputy prime minister, Pablo Iglesias of Podemos, supported the protests; the first deputy prime minister Carmen Calvo condemned his position.

The official Podemos Twitter account said "Every time that people denounce a democratic irregularity in the streets, the media powers put the focus on the unrest so that we stop debating the root problem, and nothing changes. The fact that we don't fall into that trap doesn't put us on the side of violence, but rather of democratic progress". Podemos's parliamentary spokesperson, Pablo Echenique, publicly supported the protests and first condemned their violent elements on 22 February.

In the Valencian Community, a similar government rift was reported between the Socialist Party of the Valencian Country and its allies from Podemos and the Coalició Compromís.
