= Braulio Jatar =

Chilean-Venezuelan lawyer and journalist

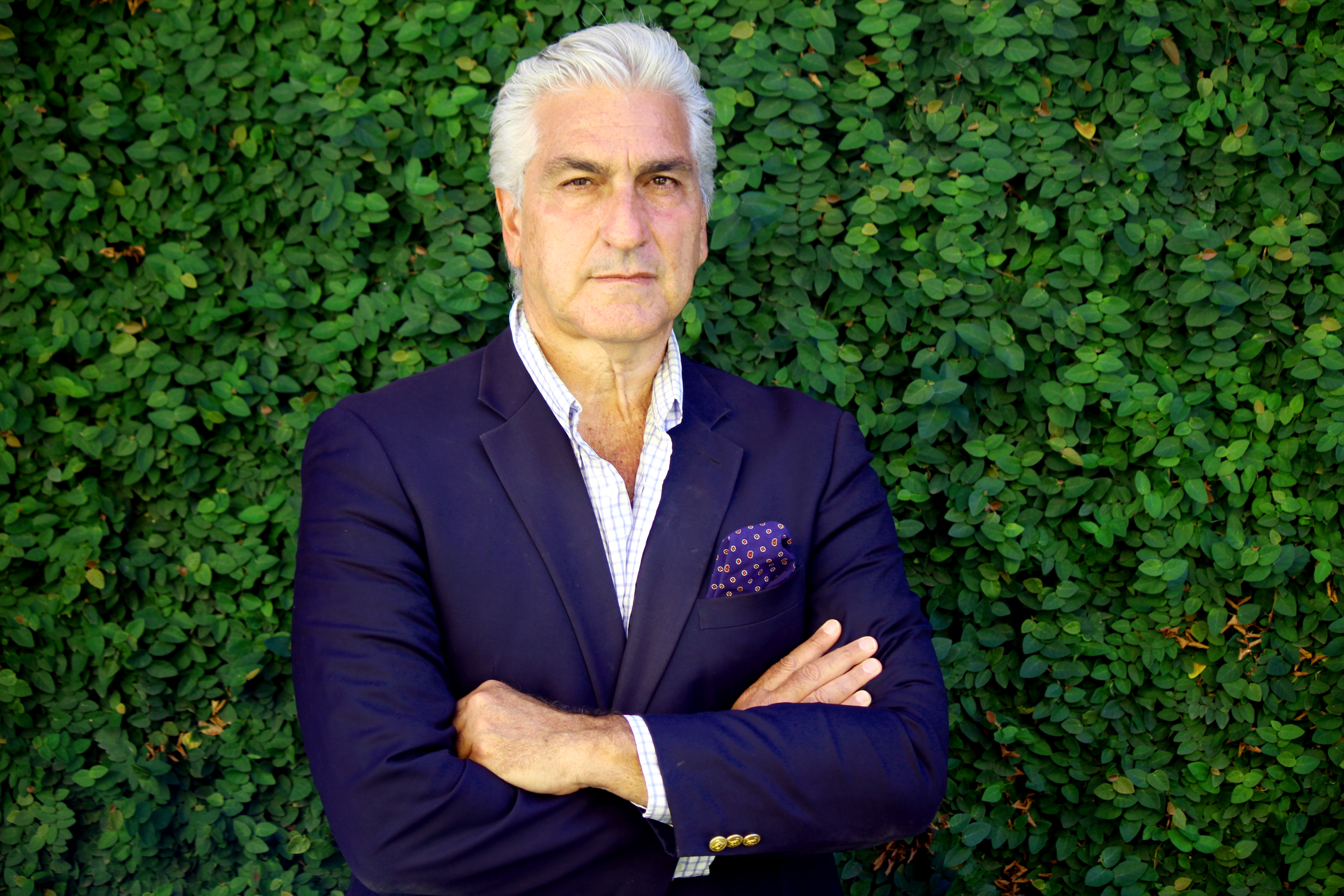
- Born: February 19, 1958 (age 68); Santiago, Chile
- Occupations: Journalist, lawyer
- Spouse: Silvia Martínez
- Family: Joanna Hausmann, Michel Hausmann

Braulio Jatar is a Chilean-Venezuelan lawyer and journalist, director of the Reporte Confidencial website, and political prisoner.

== Career ==
In addition to being a journalist, Jatar has served as a lawyer and political activist. He worked closely with Caracas journalist Oscar Yánez, has written five books, and in the 90s he was legal advisor to the National Congress. Jatar faced extortion charges in 1991 and went to Miami, being exonerated later. According to Ana Julia Jatar, his sister, Jatar was a criminal lawyer in a case against government officials accused of corruption, and in 1989 he litigated against the secretary and lover of President Jaime Lusinchi, Blanca Ibáñez. In 2007, he founded the news site Reporte Confidencial.

== Detention ==
On 3 September 2016, Jatar was arrested by officials of the Bolivarian National Intelligence Service (SEBIN) while on his way to a radio station in Porlamar, on Margarita Island. The arrest came a day after he published on his website, Reporte Confidencial, and social media, written and video reports about residents of Villa Rosa, in Porlamar, who welcomed President Nicolás Maduro with booing and cacerolazos. Maduro suddenly canceled the plans of the event in which he would inaugurate renovated apartments in the sector live on national television and the incident was reviewed by international news. Authorities said Jatar had US$25,000 in cash and accused him of planning to use them to finance an attack during the summit of the Non-Aligned Movement, held on Margarita Island on 13 September of that year.

Pedro Arévalo, a lawyer for Foro Penal, said that officials planted money on Jatar and that he was arrested in retaliation for publishing the video on his website, saying that "all he did was publish some videos." Silvia Martínez, his wife, said he was worried because he was suffering from hypertension and was afraid that the government would imprison him on false charges.

During his first hearing, on 5 September, Jatar was charged with "money laundering", facing up to 15 years in prison. His defense lawyer, Diómedes Potentini, declared that "There was no crime" and that the prosecution did not present any evidence. On 10 September, Jatar was transferred to the 26 de julio prison in San Juan de los Morros, in Guárico state, and the prison authorities prevented him from contacting his family as part of a 30-day "adaptation period", during which he suffered from anxiety attacks, hypertension and was in the prison clinic for six days. Jatar barely saw his lawyer for the first time on 20 September, 17 days after he was arrested.

On 26 September, Jatar was transferred to a prison in Cumaná, in Sucre state, where another "adaptation period" began again, preventing him from contacting his family and denying him access to cell phones and the Internet. Braulio's wife asked the prison authorities to allow him access to a cardiologist of his choice to monitor his blood pressure and heart problems. In December, his relatives and lawyers reported that Jatar had skin cancer. His sister told the Knight Center for Journalism in the Americas that the authorities had kept Jatar in solitary confinement and denied him access to sunlight, withstanding temperatures greater than 40 degrees Celsius.

In April 2017, the United Nations' Working Group on Arbitrary Detention, which was investigating the case, concluded that the detention was arbitrary and asked the Venezuelan government to release him. Authorities transferred the journalist to house arrest for health problems on 24 May. According to the conditions of the house arrest, Jatar had to be guarded for 24 hours by security forces, was forbidden to make public statements about his house and could only leave the house for medical reasons and with a judge's authorization. By the end of 2018, no date had been set for his trial.

=== Conditional release ===
In early April 2019, the United Nations High Commissioner for Human Rights, Michelle Bachelet, announced the release of Jatar and 21 other prisoners. The announcement came days after the publication of a United Nations report on human rights violations in Venezuela, which included details of the arrests and imprisonment of political dissidents. On 8 July, Jatar received and published the official notice of the criminal court on social media; Jatar is prohibited from leaving Nueva Esparta state and must appear before a court every two weeks.

== Personal life ==
Jatar's sister Ana has spoken publicly to say that her brother sympathized with Chavismo until 2007, when "he realized that it was a non-democratic process" and a form of "totalitarianism".

== See also ==
- Caso Cassandra
- Inés González Árraga
- Detention of Olga Mata
- Political prisoners in Venezuela
