= Detention of Olga Mata =

2022 detention in Venezuela

Olga Mata de Gil
- Born: c. 1949
- Children: Florencio Gil Mata

Olga Lucila Mata de Gil (born c. 1949) is a Venezuelan woman detained in April 2022 for recording a humorous video posted on the social network TikTok in which she names arepas after high-ranking government officials.

== Process ==
On 13 April 2022, an arrest warrant was issued against Mata after she recorded a humorous video published on the social network TikTok two years prior in which she names different arepas with the name of high-ranking government officials and the type of filling they had. Her son, Florencio Gil Mata, was arrested, and both were charged with the crime of "promotion or instigation to hatred". Tarek William Saab, the Attorney General imposed by the 2017 Constituent National Assembly, set up the Special 4th Control Court "with competence in cases related to terrorism". William Saab subsequently released a video of Mata apologizing for the content of the video; the Public Prosecutor's Office and the Special Court agreed on a precautionary measure against her.

The non-governmental organization Espacio Público, dedicated to the promotion and defense of the freedom of speech, condemned the arrest and recalled that the "right to record and broadcast a video exercising the full enjoyment of freedom of expression in its individual and social dimension, through humor, is not a reason for arrest nor is it a crime".

== See also ==
- Law against Hatred
- Braulio Jatar
- Cassandra case
- Inés González Árraga
- Political prisoners in Venezuela
