= Law against Hatred =

Venezuelan law

The Law Against Hatred was published in Gaceta Oficial No. 41,274

The Constitutional Law Against Hatred, for Peaceful Coexistence and Tolerance (Ley constitucional contra el odio, por la convivencia pacífica y la tolerancia), also known simply as the Law Against Hatred, is a law passed unanimously by the Venezuelan Constituent National Assembly and published in Gaceta Oficial 41,274 on 8 November 2017.

The bill was introduced to the Assembly on 10 August 2017 by President Nicolás Maduro and its discussion began on 4 September. The law establishes penalties that can include 20 years in jail, media shutdown, and fines to companies and electronic media.

The law is controversial and has been criticized in Venezuela. Its detractors say that it is designed to oppress political dissent by criminalizing it, establishing restrictions on personal freedom and promoting both censorship and self-censorship. The lack of powers of the Constituent Assembly to legislate has also been pointed out, and the National Assembly of Venezuela declared it as null and void "in rejection of the hate- and intolerance- generating instrument promoted by Nicolás Maduro and the fraudulent Constituent [National Assembly]", stating that the law violates Articles 49, 51, 57, 58, 62, 68 and 202 of the constitution.

== Outline ==
The law establishes the penalty of between 8 and 10 years in jail for officials who delay the prevention or punishment of a hate crime and for health personnel who refuse to treat a person for reasons of hate. Article 21 establishes sentences of up to 20 years in jail for those who incite hatred, discrimination or violence against a person or group of persons by any means, and Article 22 legalizes the blocking of any type of media that are considered to violate the law through their content. The law indicates that the person who disseminates a "hate message" (broadly defined or undefined in the Law) on social networks must delete it within six hours of its publication, or else must pay a fine ranging from 50 thousand to 100 thousand tax units.

The law also allows for radio or television service provider that promote hate or war propaganda to revoke these, and notes that any media that does not actively broadcast messages "intended to promote peace, tolerance and equality" will be fined by up to 4% of their gross income in the fiscal year immediately preceding that in which the offense was committed. According to the law, the fine will be paid into the Social Responsibility Fund of Radio and Television.

The law prohibits the activity of groups, movements and social organizations that do not comply with what is established in it. Similarly, Article 11 orders the National Electoral Council (CNE) to revoke the registration of political organizations that promote "fascism, intolerance or hatred towards national, racial, ethnic, religious, political, social, ideological, gender, sexual orientation, gender identity, gender expression, or of any other nature." This article also states that the parties must have among their disciplinary rules a guideline on preventative measures against such hatred, and the penalty of expulsion of persons who contravene the law.

== Prosecution history ==
On 3 January 2018, Ronald Güemes and Erika Palacios were the first people to be prosecuted under the Law Against Hatred; both were arrested when a neighborhood protest was taking place against the government of Nicolás Maduro and they were arrested by the Naguanagua police command. Luis Armando Betancourt, coordinator of Foro Penal for Carabobo, denounced that the complaint was based on statements by police officials who indicated that they had expressed messages of harm against the president and described the judicial process as irregular because the detention was arbitrary, since "they were committing no actual crime against him [Maduro]". Betancourt also said there was a violation of law via home invasion; a commission of the CICPC, SEBIN, and the municipal police raided the homes of both Güemes and Palacios without any warrant order or authorization issued by a court, which is in violation of Article 196 of the Code of Criminal Procedure. According to the file, blank rounds, molotov bombs and grenades were seized, which was denied by the victims during the hearing. The family of Palacios reported that she had been tortured by police officers; among the allegations, they point out that she was handcuffed to a desk, that for four hours they threw cold water on her body and that a cellmate was beaten by an official when she tried to prevent Palacios from being taken to an interrogation.

On 30 January 2018, the director and editor of the newspaper Región Oriente in Cumaná were summoned by the Dirección General de Contrainteligencia Militar (DGCIM) to testify following a complaint made against the 11 January publication of an article in the newspaper, in which the Communist Party of Venezuela warned the Maduro government that they were giving people reason for a social outbreak, such as the Caracazo, through inflation, shortages, lack of access to cash and the deterioration of the transport service. The National Press Workers' Union (SNTP) indicated that this DGCIM investigation was carried out by the military intelligence corps for crimes under the Law Against Hatred, being the first time an investigation against a media outlet had taken place for crimes in contradiction of it.

On 12 September 2018, two firefighters from Mérida state, Ricardo Prieto and Carlos Varón, were arrested by military counterintelligence officers after publishing a video in which President Nicolás Maduro is portrayed as a donkey; in it, a firefighter leads a donkey through the station in Mérida while another speaks with the animal as if he were leading the president on one of his official visits. On 16 September, Judge Carlos Márquez ordered that they be tried for violation of the Law Against Hatred, being charged with aggravated incitement of hatred. The defendants' lawyers said the firefighters made the video as a simple joke, not to incite hatred. On 18 September, when journalist Esteban Rojas of Agence France-Presse (AFP) asked Nicolás Maduro about his opinion of the arrests at a press conference. Maduro sharply criticized the journalist, attacking his competence and his professionalism, and implying that he was a puppet for "France", and then refused to address the question.

The doctor José Alberto Marulanda was arrested on 20 May 2018 by officers of the DGCIM, the day on which presidential elections were held in Venezuela. Despite being a civilian, four days later he was presented before military courts in Fort Tiuna, to be charged. According to Alfredo Romero, director of Foro Penal, Marulanda was not allowed a defense. The military judge charged him with the crimes of treason and instigating hatred. During his detention, Marulando has been tortured by officials, reportedly having become deaf in the right ear after being hit over the head, and having lost sensation in his hands. By November 2018, six months after his arrest, his hearing had been deferred six times.

In 2019, a Barinas state court dictated three months of community work to a man accused of instigating hate. The same year, after a campaign in media outlets and social media by progovernment movements, the pro-government Supreme Tribunal of Justice of Venezuela, through a Caracas court, ordered the ban of the screening of the documentary Chavismo: The Plague of the 21st Century at the Simón Bolívar University (USB) specifically, as well as at public universities and other public spaces in general, in response to the request of a prosecutor investigating it as an alleged hate crime or as inciting hate crimes, established in the Law against Hatred. The USB Teachers' Association responded by saying: "The regime's tribunal is a pretender and silences the freedom of speech once more in Venezuela. USB academics are affected because the university is forced to stop a screening. We expect domestic and international support." Tovar-Arroyo described the ban of his documentary as a "success without precedent", because now students would want to watch the documentary more.

On August 19, 2020, the pro-government deputy Esteban Arvelo filed a complaint with the Public Prosecutor's Office in the city of Caracas against the lawyer and human rights defender José Amalio Graterol, the social communicator Daniel Lara Farías, and the youth writer Juan Viale Rigo. The reason for the complaint was for the publication of information about the death of the pro-government politician Darío Vivas. Arvelo mentioned on his Twitter account that, using his powers as vice president of the justice commission of the National Constituent Assembly, he filed a complaint on charges of promoting and inciting hatred. In addition to threatening to follow up until justice is done.

On 13 April 2022, an arrest warrant was issued against Olga Mata after she recorded a humorous video published on the social network TikTok two years ago in which she names different arepas, named after high-ranking government officials, and described the various fillings for each. Her son, Florencio Gil Mata, was arrested, and both were charged with the crime of "promotion or instigation to hatred". Tarek William Saab, the Attorney General imposed by the 2017 Constituent National Assembly, set up the Special 4th Control Court "with competence in cases related to terrorism". William Saab subsequently released a video of Olga apologizing for the content of the video; the Public Prosecutor's Office and the Special Court agreed on a precautionary measure against her.

== Criticism ==
The Office of the Special Rapporteur for Freedom of Expression of the Inter-American Commission on Human Rights (CIDH), expressed concern that the law "establishes exorbitant criminal sanctions and powers to censor traditional media and the Internet, in contradiction with international standards regarding freedom of expression". The Rapporteur explained that the law was designed to allow the Venezuelan State to punish "expressions that should be protected by the right to freedom of expression", and that the State may even suppress content, as the law gives them the power to block and revoke licenses under the law in regards to any and all media, including the Internet.

Echoing this point of view was the Catholic Church in Venezuela, with Roman Catholic prelate Roberto Lückert León, Archbishop of Coro, raising concerns that the new law was in fact an attempt by the government to muzzle the country's opposition.

According to lawyers, human rights activists, and deputies of the National Assembly, the objective of the law is to penalize citizens who rebel against the government. They also point out that the Constituent Assembly has no power to enact laws and that the sanctions are based on indeterminate legal concepts, such as hatred, that should facilitate only the discretionary application of sanctions. The National Assembly declared the Law against Hatred void, establishing that the law violates Articles 49, 51, 57, 58, 62, 68 and 202 of the Venezuelan Constitution; Articles 6, 11, 18, 19, 20 and 21 of the Universal Declaration of Human Rights; and Articles 18 and 19 of the International Covenant on Civil and Political Rights. The Assembly also stated that the laws application violates the fundamental guarantees of the rule of law, and "intends to annihilate, once and for all, democratic values." The deputy Biagio Pilieri opened a debate and introduced the draft of the bill in which the nullity of the law was declared, which stated that "it is unconstitutional, illegitimate and illegal from its origin", and criticized the Constituent Assembly as well as directly stating that the legislation was intended to oppress people who oppose Maduro. It continues that the law and its harsh punishments are "in flagrant violation of the right to due process and presumption of innocence." The deputies who participated in the debate expressed that the law establishes restrictions on personal freedom, promotes self-censorship and censorship by the organs of the State, "suppressing the few spaces that citizens have to discuss matters of collective interest and inhibiting the possibility of making complaints of any nature".

== See also ==
- Censorship in Venezuela
- Law on Social Responsibility on Radio and Television
- Anti-Solidarity Law
