= María Fernanda Rodríguez =

Venezuelan university professor and activist

María Fernanda Rodríguez Riera
- Occupations: Professor, activist

María Fernanda Rodríguez is a Venezuelan university professor and activist.

== Career ==
Rodríguez is a member of Fundación Futuro Presente and the Lidera training program, as well as executive director of the non-governmental organization Sinergia and professor at the Metropolitan University of Venezuela in Caracas.

=== Arrest ===
On 27 January 2023, during the visit to Venezuela of the United Nations High Commissioner for Human Rights, Volker Turk, María Fernanda was detained by officers of the Scientific, Criminal and Criminalistic Investigations Corps (CICPC) at the Metropolitan University of Venezuela, when she had arrived to teach. The detention was denounced by non-governmental organizations such as PROVEA, Acceso a la Justicia, Centro de Justicia y Paz (Cepaz) and CIVILIS DDHH. Rodríguez was released hours later.

== See also ==
- Anti-Solidarity Law
- Political prisoners in Venezuela
