= Robert Serra =

Venezuelan politician (1987–2014)

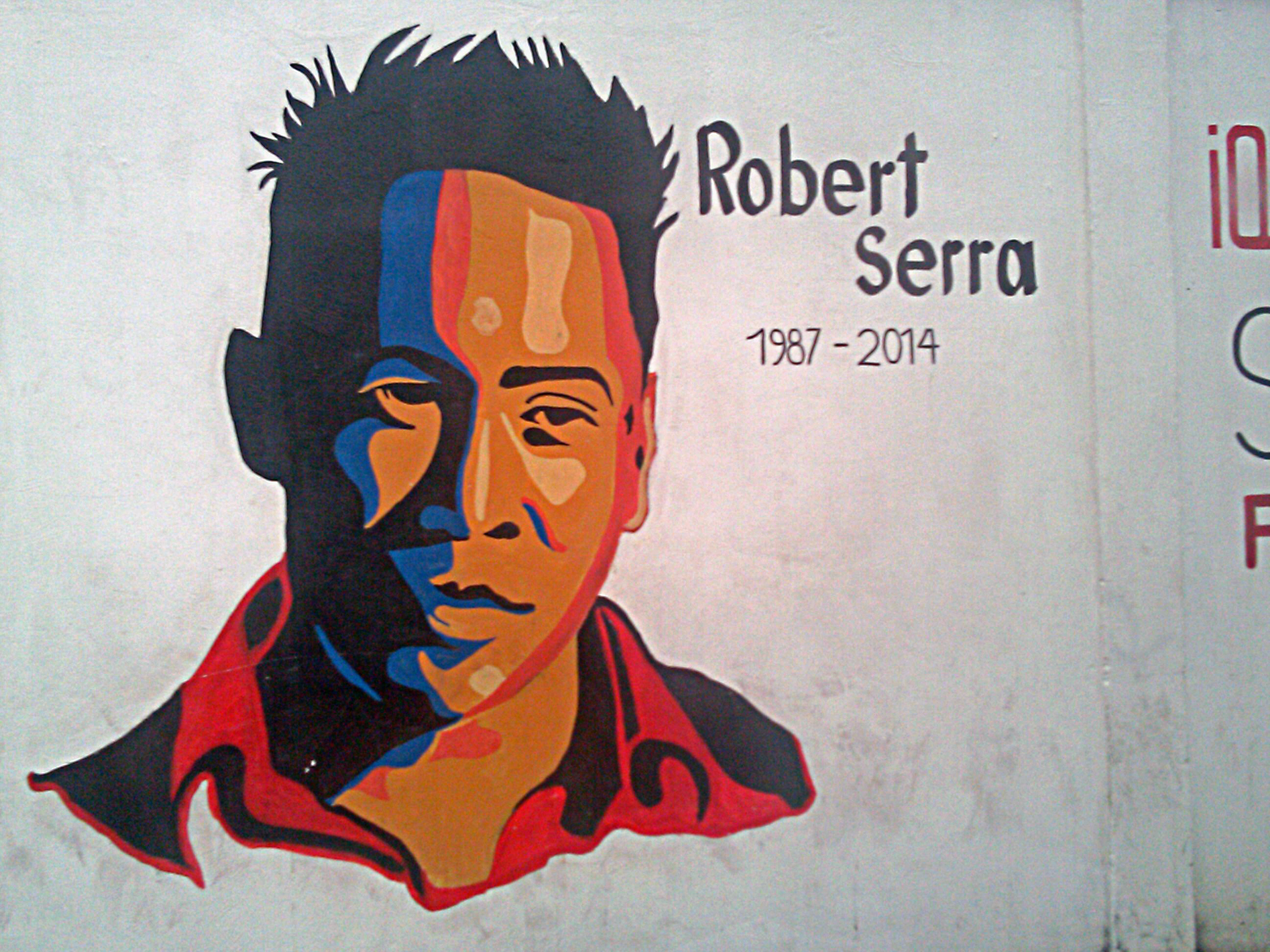

Member of the National Assembly of Venezuela
- In office 5 January 2011 – 1 October 2014
- Constituency: Capital District

Personal details
- Born: 16 January 1987 Maracaibo, Venezuela
- Died: 1 October 2014 (aged 27) Caracas, Venezuela
- Cause of death: Murder by stabbing
- Party: United Socialist Party of Venezuela
- Occupation: Criminologist and politician

Robert Serra (16 January 1987 – 1 October 2014) was a Venezuelan politician from Maracaibo and a member of the Venezuelan National Assembly for the United Socialist Party of Venezuela (PSUV).

== Early life ==
According to political analyst Helly Angel, Serra had a "very aggressive temperament" and stated that he "was very controversial, very problematic, even within their own family unit, with many conflicts and confrontations, even among his own family". He also described Serra as a "admirer of Fidel Castro, a supporter of the Cuban revolution". Serra attended Andrés Bello Catholic University where he had few friends and failed to establish a Chavista group at the university where most students had middle-class conservative roots. A former classmate stated that Serra was "Even by chavista standards, Robert was always very militant" and that he was a provocateur among students, describing an occasion after Serra made controversial statements at school that fellow students began pelting him with objects which followed with his transportation to and from campus by armed members of the Caracas Metropolitan Police. In 2010, Serra became the youngest politician ever elected to Venezuela's national legislature at the age of 23.

== Assassination and aftermath ==
Serra and his companion María Herrera were stabbed at his home in Caracas on 1 October 2014.

=== Venezuelan government ===
Following the discovery of Serra's body, the Venezuelan government accused opposition parties and hired killers of his death. Though President Nicolas Maduro stated that he would present official reports of Serra's death "within hours," he never presented such evidence within the timeframe. On 3 October, a ceremony of burial was held at the Cementerio General del Sur in Caracas where President Maduro accused foreign masterminds of Serra's murder, with those accused including former Colombian president Alvaro Uribe and "criminals" supposedly supported by the United States government. Uribe denied all of President Maduro's allegations. President Maduro also accused "ultra-right" groups in Venezuela and Colombia of Serra's death and presented a blurry video of a man who supposedly confessed to the murder stating that "the Colombia" told him to "get rid" of Serra. However, according to The Economist, the government, trailing badly in opinion polls with a crucial parliamentary election coming up in 2015, may have felt the need to rally the troops by playing up the ruthless nature of "the enemy". As of 17 October, President Maduro stated that $500,000 was paid to multiple suspects with 75% of it supposedly reserved for "the Colombia" and that seven people were arrested who were allegedly involved in Serra's murder. On 1 November in a Runrunes interview, Serra's father who had lived with Serra for 3 months stated that one of the Venezuelan government's suspects, Edwin Torres, a colectivo member who was called Serra's "head bodyguard", was unfamiliar to him.

=== Others ===
Contrasting the Venezuelan government's statements, some have called Serra's murder an alleged inside job. Members of the Venezuelan opposition were skeptical of the government's blurry video. Criminologists found it difficult to believe that Serra's murder was a "political hit". According to insiders of the situation, the murder seemed to be due to a robbery or betrayal. Another connection made to Serra's death was his close connection to colectivos, in particular the leader of the leader of the 5 de Marzo and "close associate" of Serra, José Odreman.

During a pause between a supposed gunfight in downtown Caracas, Odreman made statements hinting at the involvement between the clash and Serra's death, criticized law enforcement corruption and said to Minister Miguel Rodríguez Torres, "I lay full responsibility on you of what might happen to me. Enough comrades have been sacrificed". A little over an hour after his statements, photographs emerged showing the 5 de Marzo colectivo leader Odreman being held captive by Venezuelan authorities followed by videos which showed his dead body lying in a pool of blood. Though the Venezuelan government denied that the clashes and resulting deaths of colectivo members were related to Serra's death, Runrunes noted in an investigative article that the police and bodyguards arrested by Venezuelan authorities involved with Serra's death were also members of colectivos.

== Arrest of Leiver Padilla Mendoza and Julio Cesar Velez ==
Leiver Padilla Mendoza, a dual Colombian-Venezuelan citizen, was captured by Colombian police in November 2014 and extradited to Venezuela in 2015 to face trial for the murders of Serra and Herrera. In June 2015, Julio Cesar Velez, former députy in the Colombian city of Cúcuta and a member of Social Party of National Unity was arrested in Venezuela and charged with instigating the murder. The Colombian authorities also suspected him of murdering his wife several years earlier.

== See also ==
- Inés González Árraga
