= Anti-Solidarity Law =

Proposed law of Venezuela

National Assembly of Venezuela
- Long title: Law on Control, Regularization, Operations and Financing of Non-Governmental and Related Organisations (Spanish: Ley de Fiscalización, Regularización, Actuación y Financiamiento de las Organizaciones No Gubernamentales y Afines)
- Considered by: National Assembly of Venezuela

Legislative history
- Introduced by: Diosdado Cabello
- First reading: 24 January 2023
- Second reading: 9 January 2024
- Status: Pending

Text of the law

The Law on Control, Regularization, Operations and Financing of Non-Governmental and Related Organisations (Spanish: Ley de Fiscalización, Regularización, Actuación y Financiamiento de las Organizaciones No Gubernamentales y Afines, also known colloquially as the Anti-Solidarity Law (Spanish: Ley AntiSociedad), is a law approved by the V National Assembly of Venezuela, with a pro-government majority, presented in first discussion on 24 January 2023. The law is currently in second discussion in the National Assembly, since 9 January 2024.

The legislation grants powers to the government of Nicolás Maduro to open administrative proceedings against non-governmental organizations that can lead to the suspension of their activities up to their dissolution. The law is controversial and has been criticized by non-governmental organizations, which have denounced that it is aimed at criminalizing NGOs and human rights activists, and that it would have negative effects on both the defense of human rights and humanitarian aid in the country. As many as 400 national and international organizations have criticized the text. The United Nations High Commissioner for Human Rights, Volker Türk, called on the Venezuelan government to establish a "broad consultative process" on the law.

The Independent International Fact-Finding Mission on Venezuela expressed its concern and stated that the approval of "the NGO law may represent a point of no return in the closing of the civic and democratic space in Venezuela".

== Background ==
In 2005, the first version of the "International Cooperation Law" was drafted, which was approved on 13 June 2006 in first discussion during the II National Assembly of Venezuela, when it was presided over by Nicolás Maduro. After complaints from non-governmental organizations and alerts, the project was forgotten. In 2010, when the Assembly was presided over by Cilia Flores, the text was debated again, but was never submitted for a second discussion.

Draft of the International Cooperation Law, leaked in 2022.

In 2015, with Diosdado Cabello as president, the project was once again included in the debate agenda, generating several pronouncements against it. Amnesty International denounced that the law established that non-governmental organizations could only access funds from international cooperation if they comply with "the guidelines and policies established by the President". That year the same thing happened as in 2010, and the law was not presented in second discussion. In mid-2020, Cabello stated in his television program Con El Mazo Dando that the objective of the project was "to apply all sanctions, the maximum sanctions that can be applied to those who receive financing from the United States to conspire against the Homeland. They will later say that they are persecuted". In 2021, the project received the name of "Law of International Cooperation". The president of the foreign policy commission of the Assembly at that time, Timoteo Zambrano, stated that its objective was to "regulate the international cooperation that Venezuela receives and offers from the different national and international organizations". Since then, the law was not mentioned again until that year.

In 2022, a draft of an "International Cooperation Law" was leaked, which would sanction with suspension or elimination non-governmental organizations that, directly or indirectly, support or promote international sanctions against Venezuela.

Over 500 non-governmental organizations, including Amnesty International and Human Rights Watch, denounced that the regulation could jeopardize humanitarian aid to the most vulnerable sectors of Venezuelan society because of the likely hindrance to the receipt of resources from abroad, and that it violated other human rights such as freedom of speech. The statement also denounced that the project sought to reinterpret the definition of international cooperation according to the interests of the Venezuelan government, discarding concepts such as human rights and humanitarian aid, and given that the State had sufficient international legal norms and instruments it sought to obtain a monopoly over international cooperation.

Likewise, the law established the obligation to provide information "to any citizen who requests it" related to statutes and activities, which has generated concern among NGOs that the confidentiality that protects, for example, victims of human rights violations, could be threatened. A deputy, who remained anonymous, informed Efecto Cocuyo that the law had been presented by the United Socialist Party of Venezuela (PSUV) and distributed among the members of the foreign policy commission. On 20 January 2023, Diosdado Cabello announced that he would present a bill to regulate NGOs to the plenary of the Assembly, which he proceeded to do on 24 January. The bill was approved in first discussion. NGOs such as Redes Ayuda denounced that the law had been being prepared within the ruling party for about two years.

== Content ==
Prior to the approval of the law, Venezuelan legislation already established the registration of NGOs. Article 8 of the law establishes, under penalty of sanctions, the obligatory registration of the organization. Article 16 consists of a series of offenses, including failure to register, failure to register its acts, or failure "to comply with the obligation to cooperate with the State in its control and supervision activities".

The law empowers the government of Nicolás Maduro to open administrative proceedings in case of detection of any violation, which include the suspension of the organization's activities or even its dissolution. It expressly prohibits non-governmental organizations from "engaging in political activities" and "promoting or permitting actions that threaten national stability and institutions" and "any other act prohibited by Venezuelan law", and obliges them to hand over much of their information, including that of donors.

It also establishes the obligation to declare its inventory of assets, balance sheets, financial statements and "list of donations received with full identification of the donors, indicating whether they are nationals or foreigners", that they must register and that they must declare everything related to the law within "the first year after the entry into force of the law". The content of the law also contemplates fines of up to US$12,000 (200 petros).

== History ==
=== Proposal by Diosdado Cabello ===
On 24 January 2023, Diosdado Cabello presented the bill under the name of "Law on Control, Regularization, Operations and Financing of Non-Governmental and Related Organisation", with 17 articles and 2 transitory provisions. In his speech, Cabello questioned the origin and work of non-governmental organizations, which he described as dependencies of foreign governments and accused, without evidence, of using funds from the United States to destabilize the government. During his speech, Cabello did not mention that the civil associations are registered in accordance with the Venezuelan legislation in force and that part of the funds received are part of the international cooperation regulated by the Venezuelan State.

Cabello stated that he had a first list of 62 non-governmental organizations likely to be regulated by the law, including Súmate, PROVEA, Futuro Presente, Lidera, Instituto Parliamentario Fermín Toro and Más Ciudadanos, linked to the Andrés Bello Catholic University (UCAB). He also accused some of them, including Futuro Presente and Lidera, of being associated with opposition political parties such as Justice First and Popular Will.

=== First discussion ===
After a brief debate, the draft of the Anti-Solidarity Law was approved in first discussion by the majority of the ruling party in the National Assembly, with the abstention of the Democratic Alliance coalition. José Brito, member of the group, argued that a broad discussion of the law with the sectors of society was necessary and proposed a national commission of consultation with them for its evaluation.

According to the legislative procedure, the law was to be sent to the Internal Policy Commission, which must review the draft; it was then submitted to a second discussion for approval, after which it would enter into force.

=== Second discussion ===
On January 9, 2024, the bill entered into second discussion. At the beginning of the year, the president of the Assembly, Jorge Rodriguez, asked the deputies to initiate a "public consultation process" to contribute to the law process. Diosdado Cabello stated on January 18 that the law "would be very severe".

== Reactions ==
In joint communiqués, the project has been criticized by up to 400 national and international organizations.

Amnesty International warned about the law and called for its cessation, publishing an open letter denouncing that "the Venezuelan National Assembly took its first step to approve a law that seeks to control, restrict and potentially criminalize and close down NGOs operating in Venezuela. If this law is passed, all Venezuelan NGOs will have to comply with abusive measures or face criminal prosecution." It said the rights of association and privacy held by NGOs and their beneficiaries would be violated due to intrusive controls on information about their funding, personnel and governance. It also noted a serious risk of reprisals and criminalization.

The NGO Provea described the law as a step toward the criminalization of non-governmental organizations, and declared that it sought to outlaw Venezuelan human rights and civil society organizations. Ramón Guillermo Aveledo, president of the Fermín Toro Parliamentary Institute (included by Diosdado Cabello in the list of NGOs to which the law could be applied), declared that the institute was "openly dedicated to the promotion and defense of peaceful coexistence within the framework of the Constitution, as is clear to councilmen and legislators who attend our courses and to the readers of our publications".

Dinorah Figuera, president of the 2015 opposition National Assembly, described the law as a "new gag law" aimed at intimidating human rights activists. Juan Guaidó stated in response that Nicolás Maduro's administration sought to persecute and outlaw Venezuelan non-governmental organizations, in addition to deepening Venezuela's humanitarian emergency.

To Diosdado Cabello's announcement, Rocío San Miguel, president of the NGO Control Ciudadano, responded on his television program: "The crushing of society is advancing."

On 27 January 2023, at a press conference and on behalf of 120 non-governmental organizations nationwide, spokespersons from the organizations Civilis Derechos Humanos, Laboratorio de Paz and Acceso a la Justicia, declared that the law would have negative effects on both the defense of human rights and humanitarian aid in the country, denounced that it was aimed at criminalizing human rights activism, and described it as "repressive" and "totalitarian". The director of Access to Justice, Alí Daniels, denounced that the fines established in the law, between 3000 and 12000 dollars, were unpayable for any NGO, stating that they were designed to be unenforceable and to outlaw organizations. During the same press conference, Daniels denounced the detention of activist María Fernanda Rodríguez, of Lidera and Sinergia, at the Metropolitan University of Caracas, declaring that persecution would increase if the law was approved.

The United Nations High Commissioner for Human Rights, Volker Türk, called on the Venezuelan government to establish a "broad consultative process" on the law. The Alliance for Freedom of Expression, which groups Venezuelan civil society organizations, warned that "One of the most worrying consequences of this proposal is that it increases the risk of millions of people in the country in critical situations who today benefit from social, humanitarian and human rights programs in the midst of a long-lasting structural crisis. The absence of effective institutional guarantees for the protection of rights resulted in the displacement of more than 7 million people, which turned Venezuela into the focus of a migratory crisis without precedent in the continent".

The Independent International Fact-Finding Mission on Venezuela expressed its concern and stated that the approval of "the NGO law may represent a point of no return in the closing of the civic and democratic space in Venezuela". On 11 February 2023, the organization Espacio Público published a statement signed by more than 400 independent associations and members of civil society expressing their "alarm and rejection", stating that the law suppresses freedom of association, closes public space and would allow "reprisals against any autonomous associative form of Venezuelan society".

After the law was taken up again in January 2024, Amnesty International denounced that if approved, all NGOs would have to comply with abusive measures or face criminal prosecution, and that such measures would violate association and privacy rights, among others, putting the organizations and their beneficiaries at risk of criminalization and retaliation. The International Federation for Human Rights also spoke out against the law.

== See also ==
- Law against Hatred
- Human rights in Venezuela
