= Lèse-majesté =

Offence against the dignity of a reigning head of state

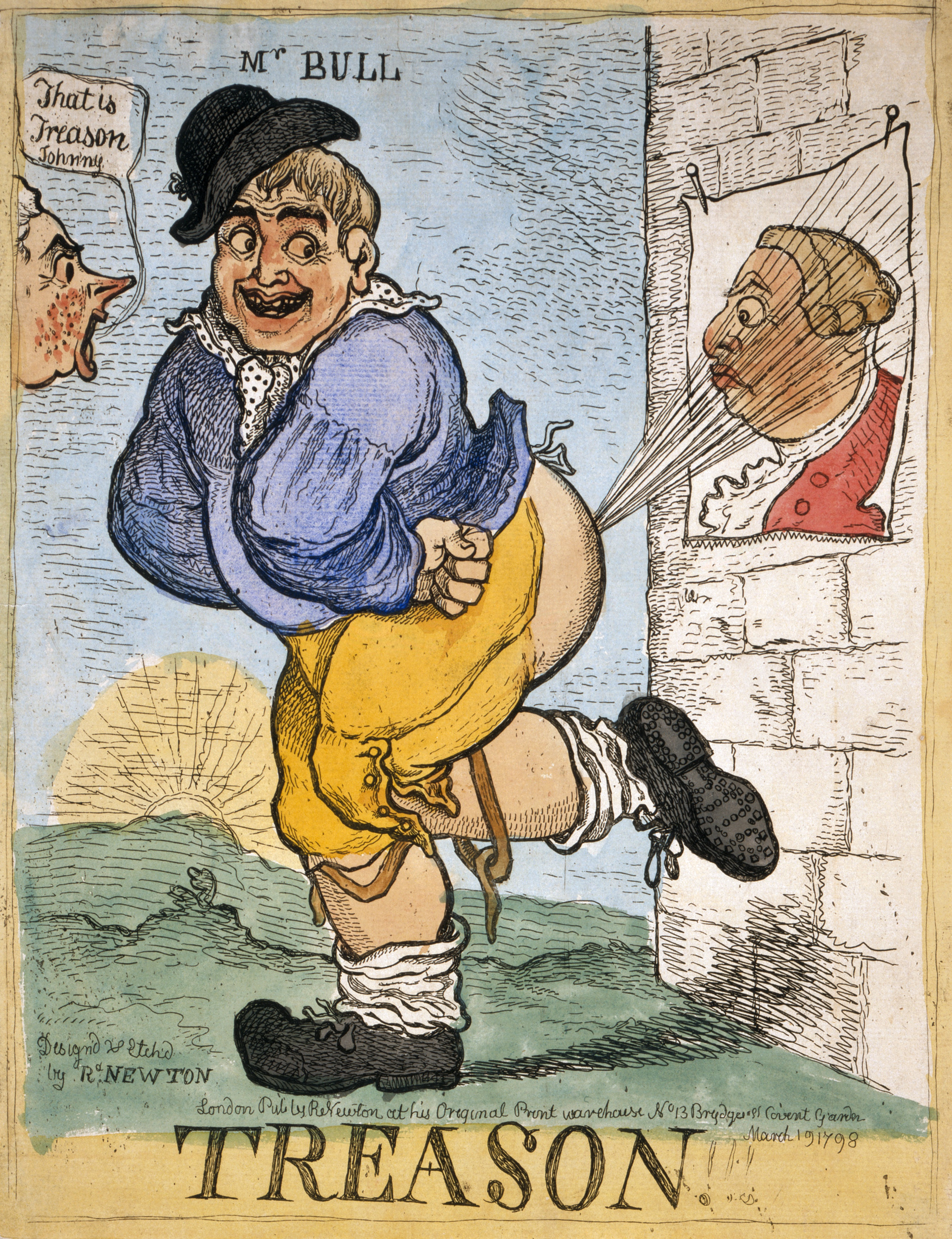
John Bull farts on an image of George III. 1798 print by the English caricaturist Richard Newton.

Lèse-majesté or lese-majesty (UK: /ˌliːz ˈmædʒɪsti/ leez MAJ-ist-ee, US: /ˌleɪz -/ layz -; lit. 'injured majesty') is an offence or defamation against the dignity of a ruling head of state (traditionally a monarch but now more often a president) or of the state itself. The English name for this crime is a borrowing from medieval Anglo-Norman French, where lese majesté, leze majesté or lese magestate (among other variants) meant 'an offence against the person or dignity of the Crown', which traces back to Classical Latin laesa māiestās ('hurt or violated majesty'), which was a form of treason against the emperor under the law of maiestas in Ancient Rome. The modern spellings are due to the later influence of modern French (in the case of lèse-majesté), and the gradual transformation of Anglo-Norman into a highly-Anglicised form known as Law French (in the case of lese-majesty), with the latter also being the origin of the heavily-Anglicised pronunciation.

The concept of lèse-majesté expressed the idea of a criminal offence against the dignity of the Roman Republic. In the Dominate, or late Empire period (from the 3rd century CE), the emperors continued to distance themselves from the republican ideals of the Roman Republic, and increasingly equated themselves with the state. Although legally the princeps civitatis (the emperor's official title, meaning, roughly, 'first citizen') could never become a sovereign because the republic was never officially abolished, emperors were deified as divus, first posthumously but later (by the Dominate period) while still reigning. Deified emperors enjoyed the same legal protection that was accorded to the divinities of the state cult; by the time Christianity replaced paganism in the Roman Empire, what was in all but name a monarchical tradition had already become well established.

Narrower conceptions of offences against majesty as offences against the Crown predominated in the European kingdoms that emerged in the early medieval period. In feudal Europe, legal systems classified some crimes as lèse-majesté even if they were not intentionally or specifically directed against the Crown. For example: counterfeiting ranked as lèse-majesté because coins bore the monarch's effigy and/or coat of arms.

With the decline of absolute monarchy in Europe, lèse-majesté came to be viewed there as a less serious crime. However, certain malicious acts formerly classified as involving the crime of lèse-majesté could still be prosecuted as treason. Some republics still classify any offence against the highest representatives of the state as a crime. Lèse-majesté laws still apply as well in monarchies outside of Europe, notably in modern Thailand and Cambodia.

== Current laws ==
A map of countries which have lèse-majesté laws as of January 2023

=== Europe ===
==== Belarus ====
On 31 January 2022, a woman in Belarus was handed an 18-month prison sentence for "insulting" the country's president, Alexander Lukashenko, and other authorities after pictures mocking the officials were found on her phone.

==== Denmark ====
In Denmark, its monarchy is protected by the usual libel paragraph (§267 of the Danish Penal Code which allows for up to four months of imprisonment), but §115 allows for doubling of the usual punishment when the reigning monarch is target of the libel. When a queen consort, queen dowager or the crown prince is the target, the punishment may be increased by 50%. There are no historical records of §115 having ever been used, but in March 2011, Greenpeace activists who unfurled a banner at a dinner at the 2009 United Nations Climate Change Conference were charged under this section. They were acquitted of the charge relating to the monarch but received minor sentences for other crimes.

==== Estonia ====
Insulting a foreign dignitary, their representatives or family members, or desecrating their flag or anthem can be punished by up to two years of imprisonment according to the Penal Code §247 and §249.

==== Germany ====
Until 2017, it was illegal to publicly insult foreign heads of state. On 25 January 2017, the German justice minister Heiko Maas announced a decision by the cabinet to remove this law from the German criminal code, effective 1 January 2018. The decision came several months after Chancellor Angela Merkel announced in April 2016 a controversial decision to honour the Turkish government's request to prosecute a German comedian for reading an obscene poem about Turkish president Recep Tayyip Erdoğan on late-night television. In that announcement, Merkel also stated the intention to consider repeal of the little-known law. The prosecution was dropped in November 2016.

Insulting the federal president is still illegal, but prosecution requires the authorisation of the president. However, members of the Bundestag can and have been sanctioned for denouncing the head of state during debates. Given that the president is recognized as an unbiased symbol of unity, it is not considered appropriate or acceptable for politicians to criticise them in public.

While insults are generally not considered to be covered by freedom of speech in Germany and remain punishable by imprisonment of up to one year, punishment is harsher for insults of politicians, up to three years in prison.

==== Iceland ====
Insulting a country, foreign head of state, its representatives or flag can be punished by up to two years of imprisonment according to the 95th article of the penal code. For a very serious breach, the term can be extended to six years.

As of 2022, two people have been convicted of lèse-majesté: author Þórbergur Þórðarson in 1934 and poet Steinn Steinarr in 1943, both for insults against Nazi Germany.

==== Italy ====
Impugning the honour or prestige of the president of Italy is punishable with one to five years in jail. This includes personal offences made regarding their exercise of powers or otherwise, with no distinction between past or current events or between the public and private spheres.

In 2019, former Northern League leader Umberto Bossi was sentenced to a year and 15 days in jail after using the ethnic slur terrone in reference to former president Giorgio Napolitano's southern origins, but was later pardoned by the then-president Sergio Mattarella.

Similarly, it is also illegal to violate the prestige of foreign flags and emblems; a similar law concerning foreign heads of state was repealed in 1999.

==== Poland ====
In Poland, it is illegal to insult foreign heads of state publicly.

- On 5 January 2005, left-wing magazine Nie publisher Jerzy Urban was sentenced by a Polish court to a fine of 20,000 złoty (about €5,000, £3,400 or US$6,200) for having insulted Pope John Paul II, a visiting head of state.
- On 26–27 January 2005, 28 human rights activists were temporarily detained by the Polish authorities for allegedly insulting Vladimir Putin, a visiting head of state. The activists were released after about 30 hours, and only one was actually charged with insulting a foreign head of state.

Article 135 of the Polish penal code states that anyone who publicly insults (Polish: kto publicznie znieważa) the President of Poland is punishable by up to three years of imprisonment. Prior to March 2021, the Polish Constitutional Tribunal declared the law consistent with the Polish constitution and Polish international treaty obligations, arguing that the effective carrying out of the duties of the president requires having authority and being especially respected.

As of 2021, there had been at least one conviction, and there were several ongoing legal cases under the law. In December 2020, a man in Toruń was sentenced to six months of community service, 20 hours per month, under lèse-majesté, for having drawn a penis on a poster of president Andrzej Duda. The man's act of writing "five years of shame" on the poster and drawing an "X" symbol on the president's image were not considered insulting by the judge in the final hearing. On 23 March 2021, three pupils appeared in court in Kalisz for a 10-minute incident in June 2020 in Sulmierzyce, in which a family member of a town councillor video-recorded the pupils pulling down a poster of president Andrzej Duda, cutting the poster, using insulting words, and proposing to burn the poster. As of 23 March 2021, the three pupils risked three years' imprisonment under lèse-majesté.

The writer and journalist Jakub Żulczyk was charged under lèse-majesté in March 2021 for referring to president Andrzej Duda as a "moron" (Polish: debil) in online social media in the context of comments criticising Duda's description of Joe Biden's 2020 United States presidential election victory.

==== Portugal ====
In Portugal, honor is considered to be an important right protected by the constitution. The 180th article of the Portuguese penal code establishes the notion of crimes against honor, making any statement of fact or any judgement expressed either verbally, visually or by other means, that is offensive to the honor of an individual either to a 3rd party or to the targeted person – even if it is in the form of suspicion and even if that person is deceased, up to 50 years – a criminal offense punishable with imprisonment of up to 6 months or a fine of up to 240 days. If the offense is directed towards either the assembly of the republic, the government, the courts, the council of state, the Public Ministry or any member of those, the prison time goes up from 6 months up to 2 years with an added fine. Any crime against the honor of the president is punishable with imprisonment from 6 months up to 3 years with an added fine. It is also illegal to prevent the president from fulfilling the duties of the office, or to incite any resident in Portugal or any member of the military to do so or to make them rise up against the authority of the president. If a person is convicted of any of those crimes, and only by request of the accuser, has the sentence publicly known.

==== Russia ====
In March 2019, the Russian Federal Assembly passed a law criminalising publication of online statements that are found "indecent" or "disrespectful" towards the President of Russia or other state and government officials, stipulating fines of up to 100,000 roubles for first-time offenders, and 200,000 roubles or up to 15 days imprisonment for repeat offenders.

==== Spain ====
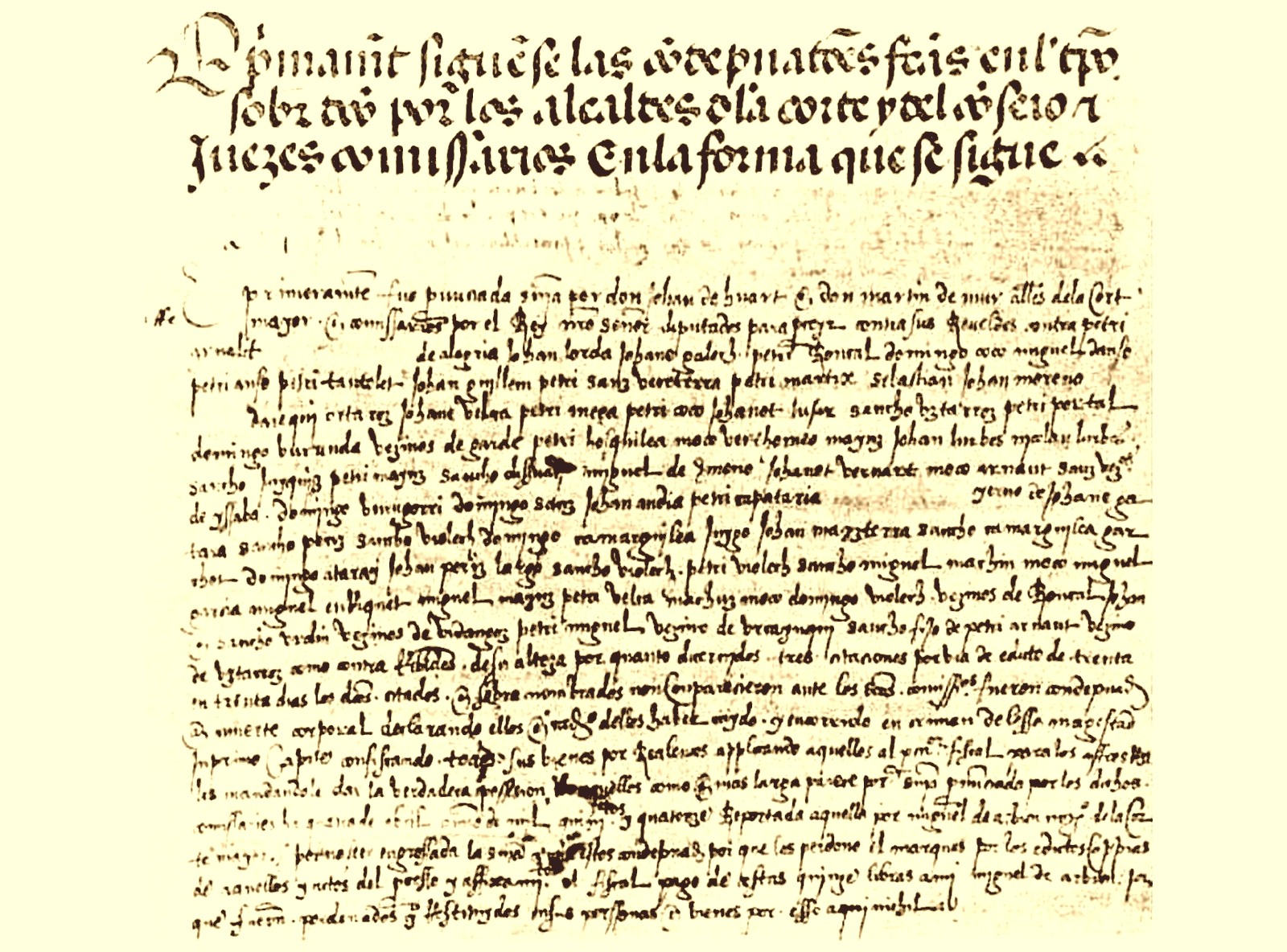
1514 lèse-majesté judgment against listed Navarrese individuals following the kingdom's conquest by Ferdinand the Catholic

Articles 490 and 491 of the criminal code govern "insults to the Crown" (Spanish: injurias a la Corona). Any person who defames or insults the king, the queen, their ancestors or their descendants can be imprisoned for up to two years. The Spanish satirical magazine El Jueves was fined for violation of Spain's lèse-majesté laws after publishing an issue with a caricature of the then Prince of Asturias, current King Felipe VI, and his wife engaging in sexual intercourse on the cover of one of their issues in 2007.

On 23 December 2020, the Audiencia Nacional summoned 12 individuals accused of offence against the crown for having pulled down mock statues of Christopher Columbus and incumbent King Felipe VI on the Day of Hispanity in Pamplona earlier that year, following a report drawn up by the National Police and Civil Guard, as stated by the accused.

On 13 March 2018, the European Court of Human Rights ruled against Spain for punishing with imprisonment two protesters in Girona, Catalonia, convicted of burning pictures depicting the King of Spain. On 17 February 2021, there were huge protests over rapper Pablo Hasél's arrest for violation of lèse-majesté laws, among others crimes. Later that year, Belgium denied the extradition to Spain of the Catalan rapper Valtonyc, prosecuted for allegedly insulting the king and incitement to terrorism.

==== Switzerland ====
In Switzerland, it is illegal to insult foreign heads of state publicly.

Any person who publicly insults a foreign state in the person of its head of state, the members of its government, its diplomatic representatives, its official delegates to a diplomatic conference taking place in Switzerland, or one of its official representatives to an international organisation or department thereof based or sitting in Switzerland is liable to a custodial sentence not exceeding three years or to a monetary penalty.

==== Turkey ====
Under Turkish law it is illegal to insult the Turkish nation, the Turkish Republic, Turkish government institutions, and Turkish national heroes. Additionally, according to Law No. 5816, insulting or swearing against the founder and first President of the Republic, Mustafa Kemal Atatürk, is a crime punishable by imprisonment from one year to three years. It is also illegal to insult the President of Turkey, with the scope of such indictment affecting comical and satirical depictions.

- Bahadır Baruter and Özer Aydoğan, two Turkish cartoonists from Penguen, were arrested for insulting President Recep Tayyip Erdoğan.
- On 18 September 2020, the lawyer of Turkey's president, Hüseyin Aydın, filed a complaint against Greek newspaper Δημοκρατία (Dimokratia) over a derogatory headline run. The headline, "Siktir Git Mr. Erdogan", meaning "Fuck off Mr. Erdogan" in Turkish, appeared next to the photo of the president. The headline also included an English translation.
- In October 2020, a French political comic magazine, Charlie Hebdo, faced possible charges in Turkey over insulting President Recep Tayyip Erdoğan. The cover of the magazine involved an image of Erdoğan lifting his wife's dress while sitting in a chair drunk.

=== Middle East ===
==== Bahrain ====
Insulting the King of Bahrain is punishable by up to seven years' imprisonment and a fine of up to 10,000 Bahraini dinars.

==== Iran ====
Iranian courts have given prison sentences for insulting the Supreme Leader of Iran or the judicial system of Iran.

==== Jordan ====
In September 2012, pro-reform activists faced charges of lèse-majesté following protests in two locations in Jordan. The protests turned violent after the activists reportedly chanted slogans against the Jordanian regime and insulted King Abdullah II and the Royal Court.

In August 2014, Mohammad Saeed Baker, a member of the Muslim Brotherhood's shura council, was arrested in Jordan and sentenced to six months in prison for lèse-majesté. He was released in February 2015.

In 2021, following an incident where a female Jordanian was sentenced for lèse-majesté after saying that she believed her father was better than the king, King Abdullah II instructed the government to look into cases of lèse-majesté under Article 195 of Jordan's Penal Code, before issuing a pardon for 155 people convicted on charges of insulting the monarch.

==== Kuwait ====
In the State of Kuwait, a charge of lèse-majesté is punishable with two years' imprisonment. In January 2009 a Kuwaiti-Australian woman spent six months in prison for allegedly insulting the Emir of Kuwait during a dispute with Kuwaiti immigration authorities.

==== Qatar ====
In 2013, a Qatari poet was sentenced to 15 years in prison for criticizing former Emir Hamad bin Khalifa Al Thani.

==== Saudi Arabia ====
Under the counterterrorism law that took effect in 2014, actions that "threaten Saudi Arabia’s unity, disturb public order, or defame the reputation of the state or the king" are considered acts of terrorism. The offense may carry harsh corporal punishment, including lengthy jail terms and even death, with the sentences potentially determined on a case-by-case basis, owing to the arbitrary nature of the Saudi legal system.

==== United Arab Emirates ====
Under Articles 183 and 184 of the Crimes and Penalties Law (Federal Decree Law No. 31 of 2021), insults directed at the President are punishable by 15 to 25 years’ imprisonment and fines. Public defamation of state authorities, institutions, founding leaders, or national symbols carries a maximum penalty of five years’ imprisonment and a fine. These restrictions extend to digital platforms through Article 25 of the Law on Combatting Rumours and Cybercrimes (Federal Decree Law No. 34 of 2021), which criminalizes the use of information technology to mock, defame, or damage the reputation of the state, its institutions, ruling authorities, or national figures. The framework applies to both public and private digital communications, without exemptions for satirical intent or any factual truth.

In 2011, five political activists known as the UAE Five, including blogger Ahmed Mansoor and economist Nasser bin Ghaith, were prosecuted under Article 176 of the predecessor 1987 Penal Code (Federal Law No. 3 of 1987), which governed lèse-majesté prior to 2021. The charges followed online forums posts which criticized the president, vice-president, and the Crown Prince of Abu Dhabi. Human Rights Watch and Amnesty International criticized the trial for severe fair trial violations under unappealable state security procedures. The Federal Supreme Court sentenced the defendants to prison terms of up to three years, though they were later pardoned by presidential decree. Mansoor was re-arrested in 2017, convicted in 2018 of "insulting the status and prestige of the UAE and its symbols including its leaders" among other charges, for which Mansoor was sentenced to 10 years' imprisonment and fined AED 1 million.

In May 2015, the Federal Supreme Court convicted five Qatari nationals for defaming and distributing insulting images of the Emirati royal family on Twitter and Instagram. Four defendants were sentenced to life imprisonment in absentia. The sole present defendant, Hamad al-Hammadi, was sentenced to ten years in prison and fined AED 1 million based on a televised confession that human rights groups and a subsequent UK Ofcom regulatory ruling found was extracted under duress and solitary confinement. In a parallel case, an Emirati citizen, Ahmed Abdulla al-Wahdi, received a sentence of ten years for running a social media account that insulted Emirati leadership.

In 2017, Jordanian journalist Tayseer Najjar, was sentenced to 3 years imprisonment under Emirati cybercrime laws for insulting Emirati "state symbols".

=== Africa ===
==== Mauritius ====
During the premiership of Pravind Jugnauth, Mauritians were routinely prosecuted for statements deemed offensive to members of the Government. In 2019, Patrick Hofman, a former pilot for Air Mauritius, was deported for having called Prime Minister Jugnauth a "lunatic". Jugnauth had the citizenship law changed so that his absolute authorization would be required for any immigrant who wished to stay in Mauritius. The law was changed specifically to be able to deport Hofman as a "prohibited immigrant", thereby ostracizing him and his Mauritian spouse out of the country. When his Mauritian spouse subsequently died, Hofman was still not allowed to enter Mauritius for her funeral rites. The question was raised directly to Jugnauth himself in Parliament.

Similarly, a Mauritian social media law was changed to allow the Government (via the police) to jail anyone who criticized them on social media. The person targeted would only have to be "annoyed" for the police to arrest the critic. In one case, Hassenjee Ruhomaully and his spouse Farirah were separately taken out of bed to be jailed for having "annoyed" a member of Government. The couple was jailed for having shared a photo on Facebook of the Prime Minister's spouse, Kobita Jugnauth, hugging a former adviser.

In 2022, a former adviser of Jugnauth's, Gerard Sanspeur, was arrested after commenting on a post about the Minister of ICT. In an operation of damage control where it was revealed that Jugnauth allowed the Indian Government to illegally tap on the SAFE fiber optic cable in total disregard of the consortium of countries who own the cable, the IT Minister, who has no IT background, falsely claimed that a laptop used to tap this cable would have exploded from the amount of data from the SAFE cable during a public conference.

In October 2022, swimmer Bradley Vincent was suspended for three years by the Mauritius Olympic Committee for using "disrespectful words" towards a Mauritian representative and failing to attend a flag raising ceremony during the 2022 Commonwealth Games. Vincent came late with three other swimmers, who got away with a severe warning, and was seemingly suspended for having questioned why the athletes did not get the £100 per diem that they had been told they would have.

==== Morocco ====
Moroccans are routinely prosecuted for statements deemed offensive to the king. The minimum penalty for such a statement is one year's imprisonment if the statement is made in private (i.e. not broadcast), and three years' imprisonment if made in public. In either case, the maximum is five years.

The cases of Yassine Belassal and Nasser Ahmed (a 95-year-old who died in jail after being convicted of lèse-majesté), and the Fouad Mourtada affair, revived the debate on these laws and their applications. In 2008, an 18-year-old was charged with "breach of due respect to the king" for writing "God, Homeland, Barça" on a school board, in reference to his favorite football club and satirising the national motto ("God, Homeland, King").

In February 2012, 18-year-old Walid Bahomane was convicted for posting two cartoons of the king on Facebook. The procès-verbal cited two Facebook pages and a computer being seized as evidence. Walid was officially prosecuted for "touching the sacralities".

==== Senegal ====
Offending the President of Senegal is punishable by a prison sentence of six months to two years and a fine of 100,000 to 1,500,000 CFA (180 to 2,700 USD).

==== Uganda ====
In Uganda, insulting the president carries severe legal consequences, as the government heavily polices criticism. Authorities regularly arrest and prosecute activists, journalists, and social media influencers under strict hate speech and cyber harassment laws, with some offenders receiving multi-year prison sentences.

==== Zimbabwe ====
Prosecutions still take place under the Criminal Law (Codification and Reform) Act, punishable by up to one year in jail or a fine of up to Z$4,800 (US$13.26),

=== Asia ===
==== Afghanistan ====
Insulting the Taliban or its officials is a punishable offense in Afghanistan under strict decrees and legal regulations implemented since their return to power.

==== Bhutan ====
Although Bhutan transitioned from an absolute monarchy to a constitutional monarchy in 2008, the country's royalty are still considered gods incarnate, making criticism of the royalty punishable under blasphemy laws.

==== Brunei ====
Lèse-majesté is a crime in Brunei, punishable with prison sentences of up to three years.

==== Cambodia ====
In February 2018, the Parliament of Cambodia voted to make insulting any monarch punishable with between one and five years in prison, along with a fine of 2 to 10 million riel.

In January 2019, a Cambodian man was sentenced to three years in jail for insulting the king in Facebook posts. This was the second sentence handed down under the law.

==== Indonesia ====
The Indonesian Criminal Code criminalizes defamation of the president and vice president, inherited from similar laws in the Netherlands. It is punishable by imprisonment from 18 to 54 months or a fine from Rp10 million to Rp200 million.

In May 2025, an Indonesian female student from the Bandung Institute of Technology was detained for allegedly posting immoral content on social media X targeting Indonesian president Prabowo Subianto and his predecessor Joko Widodo. Charged with provisions under the Electronic Information and Transactions Law (UU ITE), she faces a potential sentence of up to 12 years’ imprisonment and/or a fine of up to Rp12 billion.

==== North Korea ====
The Ten Principles for the Establishment of a Monolithic Ideological System mandate reverence for deceased North Korean leaders Kim Il Sung and Kim Jong Il. Some suggest that the execution of Jang Song Thaek in 2013 may have been related to him clapping "half-heartedly" at the 3rd Conference of the Worker's Party of Korea; however, most emphasize the importance of factional disputes in causing his execution. South Korean and international media agencies have claimed North Korean officials have been executed for "dozing off" in official meetings, especially following the execution of Kim Yong Jin in 2016, citing anonymous sources.

==== Malaysia ====
Malaysia uses the Sedition Act 1948 to charge people for allegedly insulting the royal institution, including the Yang di-Pertuan Agong. In 2013, Melissa Gooi and four other friends were detained for allegedly insulting the royal institution.

In 2014, Ali Abd Jalil was detained and served 22 days in prison for insulting the royal family of Johor and Sultan of Selangor. A prison sentence was passed in Johor for attacking the royal family to Muhammad Amirul Azwan Mohd Shakri.

==== Thailand ====
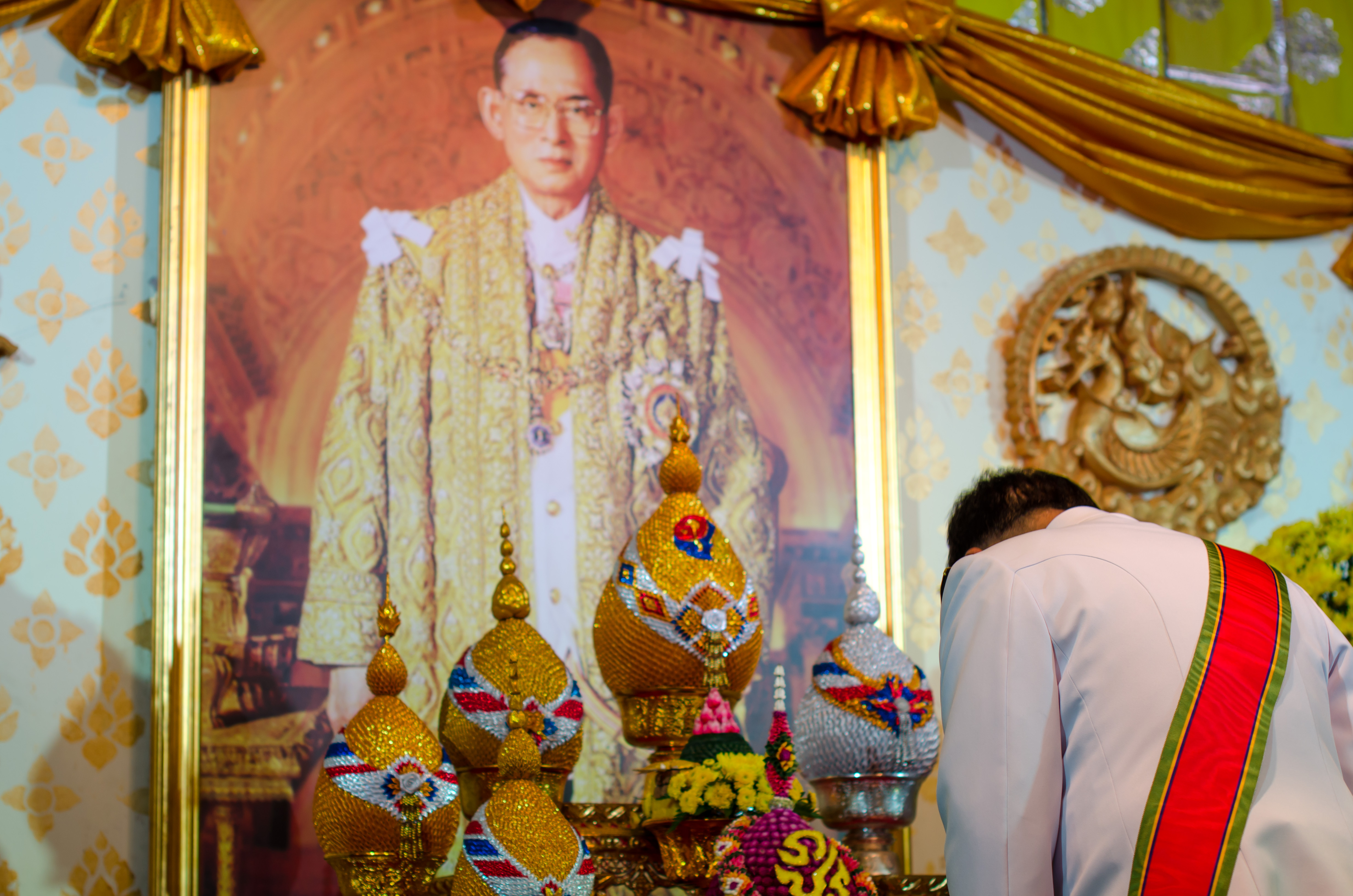
A government officer pays respect to the portrait of King Bhumibol Adulyadej of Thailand.

Thailand's criminal code has carried a prohibition against lèse-majesté since 1908. In 1932, when Thailand's monarchy ceased to be absolute and a constitution was adopted, it too included language prohibiting lèse-majesté. The 2017 Constitution of Thailand, and all previous versions since 1932, contain the clause, "The King shall be enthroned in a position of revered worship and shall not be violated. No person shall expose the King to any sort of accusation or action." The Thai criminal code elaborates in Article 112: "Whoever defames, insults or threatens the King, Queen, the Heir-apparent or the Regent, shall be punished with imprisonment of three to fifteen years." Missing from the code, is a definition of what actions constitute "defamation" or "insult".

From 1990 to 2005, the Thai court system only saw four or five lèse-majesté cases a year. From January 2006 to May 2011, more than 400 cases came to trial. Observers attribute the increase to increased polarization following the 2006 military coup and sensitivity over the elderly king's declining health. In 2013, the Supreme Court of Thailand ruled in case no. 6374/2556 that Article 112 of the Penal Code protects past kings as well as the present one. Criticism or comments which tarnish past kings or the monarchy are punishable by law. Scholars raised doubts as to how far back lèse-majesté will be applied, as the present Thai monarchy (Chakri dynasty) dates back more than 200 years, while other monarchies which ruled Siam can be traced back almost 800 years.

Neither the king nor any member of the royal family has ever personally filed any charges under this law. During his birthday speech in 2005, King Bhumibol Adulyadej encouraged criticism: "Actually, I must also be criticized. I am not afraid if the criticism concerns what I do wrong, because then I know." He later added, "But the King can do wrong", in reference to those he was appealing to not to overlook his human nature.

Under the NCPO junta which overthrew the democratic regime in May 2014, charges of lèse-majesté have increased significantly, especially against the opponents of the junta. Lèse-majesté is now seeing increasing use as a tool to stifle free speech and dissent in the country. Even the parents of the former princess Srirasmi Suwadee as well as her uncle have been charged with lèse-majesté. In March 2015, a court sentenced her father Apiruj Suwadee and mother Wanthanee for insulting the royal family and lodging a malicious claim. They pleaded guilty to the offenses named and were sentenced to two-and-a-half years in prison. In June 2017, in Bangkok a 33-year-old Thai man was given 35 years imprisonment for posting 10 Facebook photos and comments about the Thai royalty. This sentence was reduced from the initial 70 years following a guilty plea made after a year in jail before the trial.

In June 2017, the United Nations called on Thailand to amend its law on lèse-majesté.

== Former laws ==
=== Asia ===
==== Japan ====
Laws against offending the Emperor of Japan were in place between 1880 and 1947, when the law was abolished during the United States-led Allied occupation. The last person to be convicted of the crime was Shōtarō Matsushima, a factory worker and member of the Japanese Communist Party. During a 1946 protest against food shortages in front of the Imperial Palace, during which the protesters demanded entry into the palace kitchens which were said to be stocked with staple foods, Matsushima wielded a placard reading, on the one side, "Imperial Edict: The Emperor system has been preserved. I, the Emperor, have eaten to my heart's content, but you, my subjects, should starve to death! Signed, (Imperial Seal)". The other side demanded that the Emperor give a public accounting of the food shortages. Matsushima was arrested and charged with impairing the dignity of the Emperor. The Allied occupation authorities intervened and had the charges reduced to libel. Matsushima was convicted and sentenced to eight months in prison, but was pardoned immediately under an Imperial amnesty commemorating the new Constitution.

=== Europe ===
==== Belgium ====
On 28 October 2021, Belgium's Constitutional Court ruled that a law dating from 1847 which penalised insulting the monarch with a fine or imprisonment violates the right to freedom of expression as guaranteed under the Belgian Constitution as well as the European Convention on Human Rights. The law was repealed in January 2023.

==== Nazi Germany ====
Adolf Hitler's cult of personality served as a powerful force for political integration in Nazi Germany, often shielding him from criticism that frequently targeted other Nazi leaders and the regime. His image partly relied on his role in the recovery of the economy of Nazi Germany, contributing to the (perceived) legitimacy of his charismatic authority. But some dissent simmered beneath the surface, with outbursts prompting journalists to coin the term Führerbeleidigung (lit. 'insulting the Führer', approximating lèse-majesté). Most arrests for Führerbeleidigung were reported in working-class districts, where the insults were also most forceful.

Hitler was often identified as a megalomaniac or a criminal (e.g., a self-proclaimed classmate said Hitler was a "crook" who tortured animals). Many insults were scatological, drawing on the Swabian salute as in Goethe's Götz von Berlichingen, or sexual, as when a night-watchman in Vienna was arrested for claiming he slept with Hitler. Others were more serious, even wielding the Nazis' own metaphors, as when a furnace apprentice called Hitler and Hermann Göring insects in need of extermination.

After the 1939 Bürgerbräukeller Bombing, there were reports of arrests for comments "that the attempt on the Führer's life was simply a result of his repression of the Catholic population". A mechanic in Wiener Neustadt was arrested for saying the attackers deserved medals. Three others in Vienna were also arrested for similar remarks; one suggested he would kill Hitler himself.

==== Netherlands ====
In 1966, Dutch cartoonist Bernard Willem Holtrop depicted Queen Juliana of the Netherlands as a window prostitute in the 1st issue of the Provo movement cartoon magazine, "God, Nederland en Oranje". He was sued for lèse-majesté, but the judge eventually acquitted him of the charge. Willem moved to France afterwards.

Lèse-majesté of the monarch was punishable with up to five years in prison and/or a fine. The insulting of the Royal Consort, the heir apparent or their consort, or the Regent, was punishable by four years in prison and/or a fine. In the same vein, the insulting of an allied head of state, who is in the Netherlands in their official capacity, was punishable by up to two years and/or a fine.

In total, 18 prosecutions were brought under the law between 2000 and 2012, half of which resulted in convictions. In October 2007, a 47-year-old man was sentenced to one week's imprisonment and fined €400 for, among other things, calling Queen Beatrix a "whore" and telling a police officer that he would have anal sex with her because "she would like it". In July 2016, a 44-year-old man was sentenced to 30 days in jail for "intentionally insulting" King Willem-Alexander, accusing him of being a murderer, thief and rapist.

These laws have been abolished as of 1 January 2020. Insulting the monarch or their consort, the heir apparent or their consort, or the Regent, is now punishable on the same level as public officials in their official capacity. The law against insulting persons mentions a one-third increase in maximum punishment for those categories, compared to insulting regular people.

==== Norway ====
Following the 2005 Penal Code (introduced in 2015), lèse-majesté is no longer considered a criminal offense.

The 1902 Penal Code, article 101, provided a fine or up to five years of prison for lèse-majesté. According to article 103, prosecution had to be ordered or accepted by the king. Article 101 stated: "If any defamation is exercised against the King or the Regent, the guilty is punished with a fine or up to five years of prison."

==== Romania ====
In Romania, lèse-majesté laws were abolished in 2014, after the adoption of the 2009 Penal Code. However, Article 30.7 of the Romanian constitution specifies that defamation of the state and the nation shall be prohibited by law.

==== Sweden ====
In Sweden, the laws for lèse-majesté were repealed in 1948.

==== United Kingdom ====
The Treason Felony Act 1848 makes it an offence to advocate the abolition of the monarchy. Such advocation is punishable by up to life imprisonment under the Act. Though still in the statute book, the law is no longer enforced in practice.

Section 51 of the Criminal Justice and Licensing (Scotland) Act 2010 abolished the common law criminal offences of sedition and "leasing-making" in Scottish law. The latter offence was considered an offence of lèse-majesté or making remarks critical of the monarch of the United Kingdom. The final prosecution for this offence had occurred in 1715.

=== North America ===
==== United States ====
The Sedition Act, enacted in 1798, made it illegal to print "false, scandalous and malicious writing" against the President of the United States or of the federal government. The act was utilized to forbid criticism of the president or government. The law was denounced as unconstitutional by its opponents, but was never brought before the Supreme Court. It expired in 1801. Modern jurisprudence concerning the First Amendment to the United States Constitution would make such laws unconstitutional.

== See also ==
- Blasphemy
- Flag desecration
- Insubordination
- Lèse-nation
- Mutiny
- Naming taboo
- Sedition
- Streisand effect
