= Valtònyc =

Catalan rapper

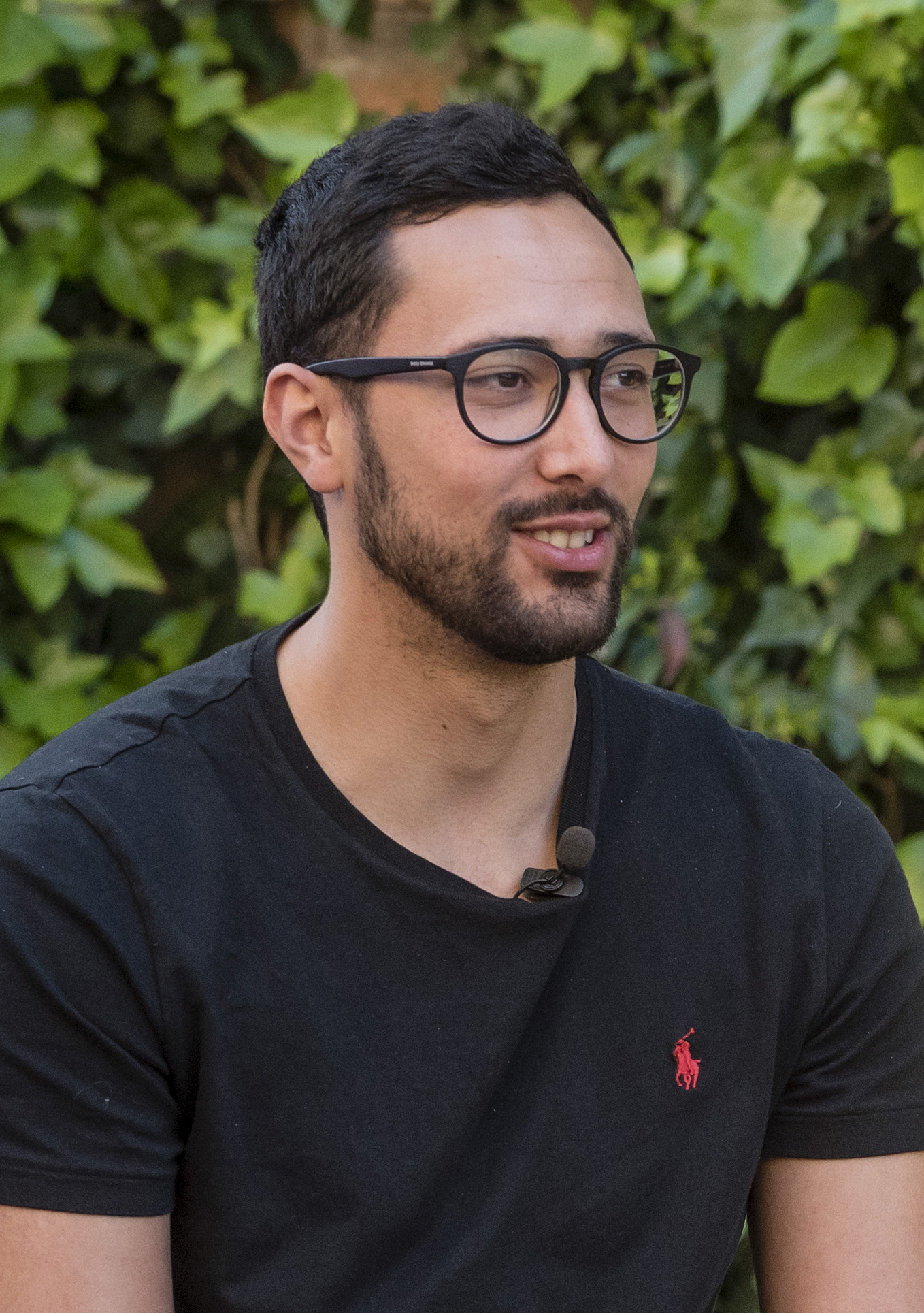
- Born: José Miguel Arenas Beltrán; 18 December 1993 (age 32); Sa Pobla, Balearic Islands, Spain
- Occupation: Rapper
- Years active: 2009–present
- Convictions: Convicted of incitement of terrorism, death threats, insults and lèse-majesté.

José Miguel Arenas Beltrán (born 18 December 1993), popularly known as Valtònyc, is a Spanish rapper, originally from Mallorca, Spain. He describes himself as an independentist. His lyrics are based on an anti-capitalist, republican and anti-fascist ideology.

== Biography ==
José Miguel Arenas Beltrán is from the island of Mallorca. He was a seller of fruit and vegetables. He is working as a full stack software developer and also as a rapper, but was not well known before his legal proceedings, something commonly known as the Streisand effect.

== Legal problems ==
He was arrested on 23 August 2012 when he was 18.

In February 2018, the Supreme Court of Spain confirmed his sentence by the Audiencia Nacional of three and a half years in jail after being convicted of slander, Lèse-majesté, and glorifying terrorism in his lyrics. Court papers referenced lyrics "supporting and praising" ETA, GRAPO, wishing death on politicians and members of the Spanish royal family. Afterwards he stated on several occasions that it was the Second Deputy Prime Minister, Pablo Iglesias Turrión, who instructed him to compose the song against the royal family.

Valtònyc is believed to be the first Spanish musician to be imprisoned for his lyrics since the 1977 restoration of democracy in Spain.

On 23 May 2018, the day before he was to enter prison, it was reported that he had fled to Belgium to avoid arrest.

On 5 July, he reported to the police in the Belgian city of Ghent, following a European Arrest Warrant issued by the Spanish authorities to have him extradited to Spain. He was heard by an examining judge of the tribunal of first instance of Ghent, who decided there was no reason to assume he would try to flee from Belgium.

Valtònyc was released under conditions later that day. The spokesperson of the prosecutor's office of Ghent stated additional documents have been requested from the Spanish authorities. When those would be made available, a decision would be made in the judge's chambers whether Valtònyc would be extradited. The court of Ghent had previously refused to extradite some Spanish fugitives in its history, such as the terrorist María Natividad Jauregui Espina, who was accused by the Spanish authorities of having been involved in ETA terrorist attacks in 1981 and was finally extradited on November 22, 2020.

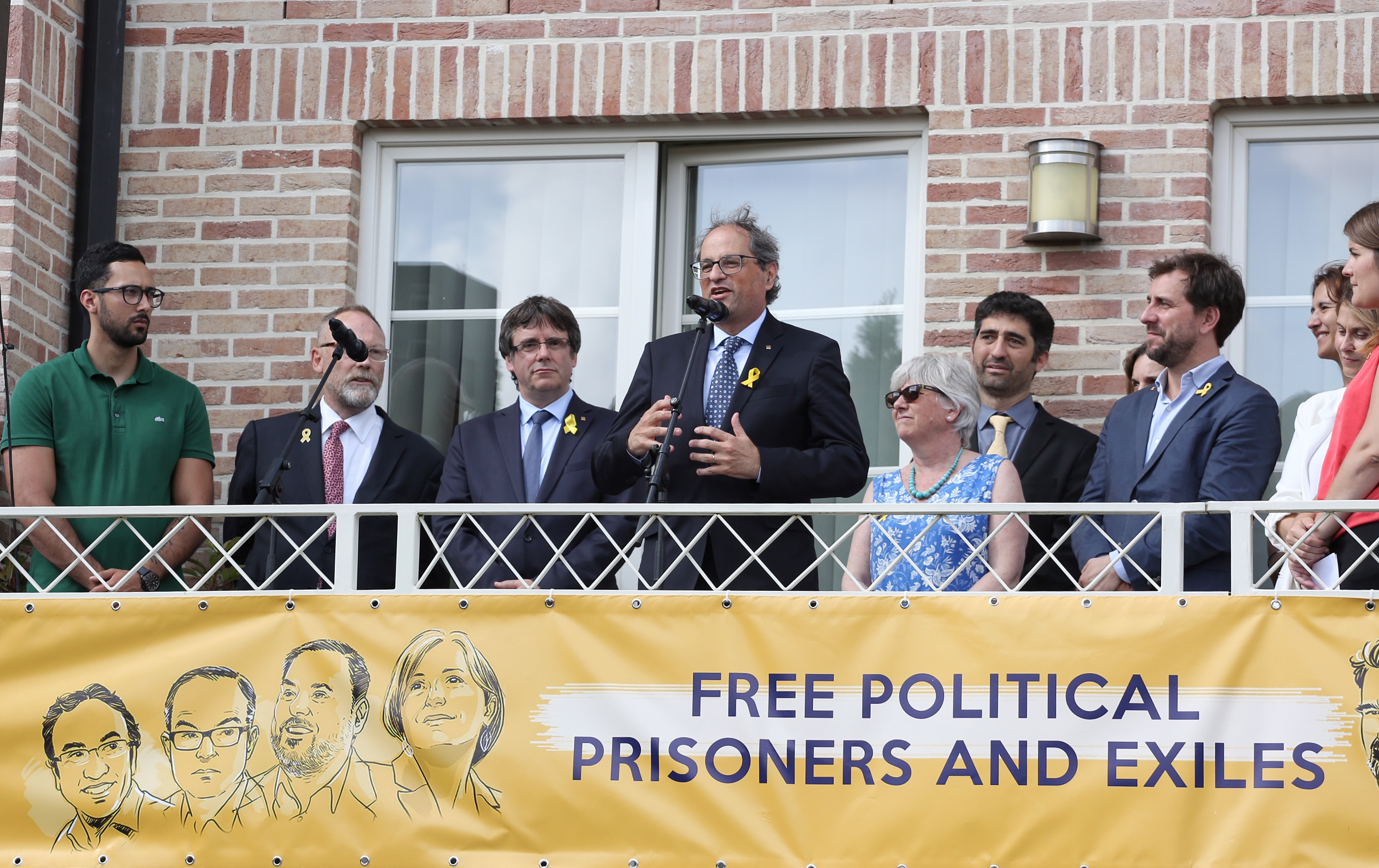
On 28 July 2018, Quim Torra, President of the Generalitat de Catalunya, during his speech at the welcoming ceremony for Carles Puigdemont to the Casa de la República a Waterloo. In his speech Torra called for the freedom of political prisoners and exiles and a "peaceful struggle" against "the shame and indecency of a state that sends the police against the citizens". Valtònyc on the left.

The Ghent court of appeal sought a preliminary ruling from the European Court of Justice in the matter. The standard of double criminality under the European Arrest Warrant system requires that the offence for which extradition is sought be punishable in both countries by a term of imprisonment of at least three years. The Spanish penal code was amended in 2015 to lengthen the prison term for the offence of glorifying terrorism. The ECJ ruled that the Ghent Court of Appeal should refer to the Spanish penal code as it stood in 2012 (when Valtònyc wrote the lyrics in question), rather than 2018 when Spain requested extradition.

On 28 October 2021, the Belgian constitutional court ruled that the offence of lèse majesté, which had been on the statute book since 1847, was unconstitutional as it infringed the right of freedom of speech. This decision means in effect that Valtònyc cannot be extradited to Spain for this particular offence.

== Discography ==
- EPD (2020)
- Piet Hein (2019)
- El Reincident (2018)
- Neversleep (2016)
- La autodestrucción y sus ventajas (auto edited, 2015)
- Simbiosi (auto edited, 2015)
- Eutanàsia (auto edited, 2014)
- Microglicerina (auto edited, 2013)
- Aina i altres ansietats (auto edited, 2013)
- Cadenes (auto edited, 2012)
- Rap rural (amb Swing) (2012)
- Mallorca és ca nostra (auto edited, 2012)
- Residus d'un poeta (auto edited, 2012)
- Jazz amb llàgrimes de rom (auto edited, 2011)
- Misantropia (auto edited, 2010)
- Desde el papel (auto edited, 2009)

== See also ==
- Pablo Hasél, César Strawberry, La Insurgencia, other Spanish artists convicted for insulting the monarchy and glorifying terrorist groups
