= Cassandra case =

Spanish court case

The Cassandra case (Spanish: Caso Cassandra) was a Spanish court case against Cassandra Vera Paz (born 3 November 1995). Vera was charged in 2016 with injury to victims of terrorism after she posted a series of tweets poking fun at the Franco-era assassination of Luis Carrero Blanco. In 2017, the Audiencia Nacional (National Court) sentenced her to one year in prison plus a seven-year penalty of absolute disqualification, which disqualifies a convict from holding public office or employment, and disallows a convict to obtain government grants, scholarships, or any public aid. The ruling was reversed in 2018 by the Supreme Court of Spain; it found that repeating well-known jokes about an attack that happened 44 years ago, about which "endless jokes have been made", without any abusive comments toward the victim, "is socially and even morally reprehensible in terms of mocking a serious human tragedy," but "a penal sanction is not proportionate." The court also took into account Vera's age – 18 – at the time of publishing the tweets.

== History ==
Luis Carrero Blanco served as the prime minister of Francoist Spain for six months in 1973.

=== Operación Araña (Operation Spider) ===
Between 2013 and 2016, Cassandra Vera Paz published a series of tweets about the assassination of Francoist Luis Carrero Blanco. Blanco, who was Prime Minister of Spain, was assassinated by the terrorist group Euskadi Ta Askatasuna (ETA) on 20 December 1973. Following an investigation conducted by the information service of the Spanish Civil Guard called Operation Araña (Operation Spider), Vera was charged for injury to victims of terrorism. According to Vera's testimony, on 13 April 2016, the Civil Guard summoned her to make a statement in relation to a robbery she had reported the previous year. After she arrived at the police station, Vera was informed that she had been criminally charged, and her mobile phone was seized.

=== National Court trial ===
Vera was charged based on the following thirteen tweets and in nearly all of them the key to the humor was the fact that the car, in which Carrero Blanco was traveling, flew high up into the air and over a five-story church, landing on the second-floor terrace of a building. (Spanish quote plus English translation).

1. "ETA impulsó una política contra los coches oficiales combinada con un programa espacial." (ETA promoted a policy against official cars combined with a space program).
2. "Película : A tres metros sobre el cielo. Producción: ETA films. Director: Argala. Protagonista: Carrero Blanco. Género: Carrera espacial" (Film: Three Steps Above Heaven. Production Company: ETA films. Director: Argala. Protagonist: Carrero Blanco. Genre: space race).
3. "Kissinger le regaló a Carrero Blanco un trozo de la luna, ETA le pagó el viaje a ella" (Kissinger gave Carrero Blanco a piece of the moon, ETA paid for the trip).
4. "Si hacer chistes de Carrero Blanco es enaltecimiento del terrorismo..." (If making jokes about Carrero Blanco is praising terrorism...)
5. "Perdone usted, @GcekaElectronic, un respeto por el gran Carrero, la estación internacional de la ETA puso todo su esfuerzo" (Excuse you, @GcekaElectronic, a bit of respect for the great Carrero, ETA's international space station did all it could.)
6. "¿Ya no puedo hacer chistes de Carrero Blanco?" (Can I no longer make jokes about Carrero Blanco?)
7. "Elecciones el día del aniversario del viaje espacial de Carrero Blanco. Interesante" (Elections on the anniversary of Carrero Blanco's space flight. Interesting.)
8. "Spiderman VS Carrero Blanco" Accompanied with an image of Spiderman peering through buildings at a long car.
9. "¿Carrero Blanco también regresó al futuro con su coche? #RegresoAlFuturo" (Did Carrero Blanco also go back to the future in his car? #BackToTheFuture.)
10. "Feliz 20 de diciembre" (Happy December 20) Accompanied with three images: one that is a photograph of the effects after the attack on Blanco and two that recreate the explosion and trajectory of Blanco's official vehicle.
11. "20D" Accompanied with a photo collage of an astronaut with Blanco's face, on what appears to be the surface of the Moon with the Franco-era flag.
12. "URSS VS SPAIN. URSS Yuri Gagarin VS SPAIN Carrero Blanco" URSS is the Spanish abbreviation for the Soviet Union and Yuri Gagarin, a cosmonaut, was the first human to journey into outer space.
13. "Contigo quiero volar, para poder verte desde el cielo, en busca de lo imposible, que se escapa entre mis dedos" (With you I want to fly, to be able to see you from the sky, in search of the impossible, that slips through my fingers) Accompanied with an image that depicts the upward flight of Blanco's vehicle.

Vera appeared before the investigating judge on 13 September 2016 with her court-appointed lawyer. The lawyer was later fired because he wanted to base Vera's defense on a claim of mental insanity due to Vera being transgender, and because Vera felt he was ultra-conservative after he told Vera that he was an admirer of Blanco. Vera worked with new lawyers and decided to base her defense on freedom of expression.

The National Court found Vera guilty on 29 March 2017 of the crime of humiliation of the victims of terrorism. The court considered that Vera's tweets, published between 2013 and 2016, constituted contempt, dishonor and mockery towards the victims of terrorism and their families. Public reaction to the ruling was quick and fierce; many, including Blanco's granddaughter, Lucía Carrero-Blanco, thought that, as regrettable as the tweets may be, freedom of expression should not lead to a prison sentence. She wrote a letter to El País criticizing the two year, six-month prison sentence and described the jail term as “disproportionate and total madness,” adding: “I am frightened by a society where freedom of speech, however regrettable it might be, can mean a jail term.”

Supporters retweeted the offending tweets with new supportive hashtags and some even made more offensive jokes. Nonetheless, the National Court tribunal, composed of Juan Francisco Martel Rivero, Teresa Palacios, and Carmen Paloma González, sentenced her to one year in prison and revocation of her voting rights for the same time period, and seven years of inhabilitación absoluta (absolute disqualification) which disqualifies a convict from holding public office or employment, and disallows a convict to obtain government grants, scholarships, or any public aid. The court also required payment of court costs and the removal of the tweets. The prosecutor Pedro Martínez Torrijos asked for two years and six months of prison, three years' probation, and eight years and six months of absolute disqualification. The sentence caught the attention of international news media and political parties such as United Left and Podemos. United Left retweeted the offensive tweets from its official Twitter account.

=== Supreme Court hearing ===
The sentence was appealed before the Supreme Court of Spain citing six reasons.

1. For violation of article 20 of the Constitution of Spain, of article 19 of the Universal Declaration of Human Rights and of article 11 of the Charter of Fundamental Rights of the European Union, wherein the right to freedom of speech is inviolable.
2. For violation of article 24.2 of the Constitution of Spain, the presumption of innocence, since no sufficient proof of the charge has been made.
3. For miscarriage of justice by improper application of article 578 of the penal code (law against praising terrorism and humiliation of victims of terrorism, introduced by the Ley Orgánica 7/2000, of December 22) without sufficient reason.
4. For miscarriage of justice, based on article 579bis of the penal code, for ignoring personal circumstances and the context and the content typical of Twitter.
5. For miscarriage of justice by undue application of article 14.3 of the penal code, by failure to apply invincible error and attenuate penalty based on the feasibility of ignorance of the crime.
6. For miscarriage of justice by obvious error in the assessment of the evidence presented by the defense.

The public prosecutor challenged all of these points. However, on 26 February 2018, the Supreme Court considered the appeal and reversed the National Court ruling; the court rejected the second reason, but accepted the third and considered it unnecessary to examine the remaining reasons. The court concluded that the tweets did not contain any bitter comment against the victim of the attack nor did they express hurtful, cutting, or insulting phrases or comments against their person; the singular subject of the joke was in the manner in which the attack was carried out with special emphasis on the fact that the car reached a great altitude; and that the attack had taken place forty-four years ago, more than enough time to consider it a historical event whose humorous treatment cannot have the same significance as that of a recent event. Therefore, magistrate Alberto Jorge Barreiro, speaking for the court, stated that although the conduct of the accused was reproachable from a social and even moral perspective, the case did not require a response from the penal system, and that the actual response was not appropriate or proportionate. The case was heard by magistrates Alberto Jorge Barreiro, Andrés Martínez Arrieta, Miguel Colmenero Menéndez de Luarca, Antonio del Moral García, and Ana María Ferrer García.

Vera immediately responded to the news of the Supreme Court ruling: "I'm very happy on a personal level to see the end of a judicial ordeal that no one should have to go through. But I'm very worried about other sentences, such as that of Valtònyc and other rappers and tweeters."

== See also ==
- Inés González Árraga
- Detention of Olga Mata
