= Inés González Árraga =

Venezuelan former political prisoner (born 1973)

- Born: Inés Margarita González Árraga; 31 January 1973 (age 53); Maracaibo, Venezuela
- Education: University of Zulia
- Parent: Inés Árraga

Inés Margarita González Árraga (31 January 1973) is a Venezuelan former political prisoner, currently living in exile.

== Biography ==
González studied chemistry at the University of Zulia, later completing a master's degree at the Venezuelan Institute for Scientific Research and a PhD at the University of Akron in the United States.

On 4 October 2014, she was detained by Bolivarian Intelligence Service (SEBIN) officers for posting messages on Twitter about the death of ruling party deputy Robert Serra. She was initially indicted on charges of instigating hatred, violent insult and insulting a public official. Her lawyer argued that this could not be an instance of violent insult, because in order to commit the offense she would have had to be in presence of the official, whereas her tweets were posted when Serra was already dead. Subsequently, the charges of violent insult and insulting a public official were withdrawn by the Venezuelan authorities.

González was held in El Helicoide, headquarters of the SEBIN in Caracas, until 16 November 2015, when she was granted the humanitarian measure of house arrest by the Criminal Chamber of the Supreme Tribunal of Justice after being diagnosed with a parauterine tumor.

On 27 September 2017 González fled Venezuela, saying that government officials wanted to jail her again. She currently resides in Spain.

== See also ==
- Cassandra case
- Detention of Olga Mata
- Political prisoners in Venezuela
