= Detention of Juan Requesens =

2018–2020 arrest in Venezuela

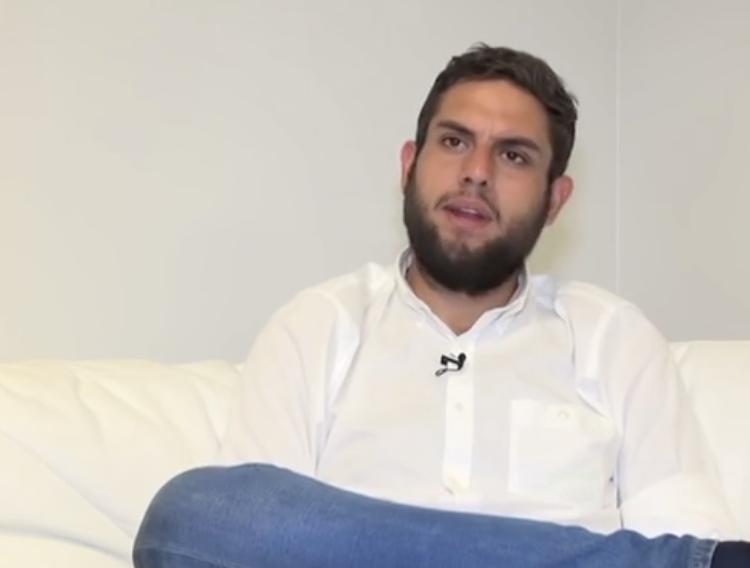
Juan Requesens talking to Voice of America in 2017

Juan Requesens, a deputy of the Venezuelan National Assembly, was arrested as a suspect in the Caracas drone attack, an alleged assassination plot on the Venezuelan President Nicolás Maduro. The circumstances of his arrest and detention are controversial, and irregularities surround the legal proceedings. Requesens was imprisoned in El Helicoide from his arrest on 7 August 2018, with allegations of torture to coerce a confession, (Note: For allegations of torture, see the Video controversy section of this article) and delays impeding the legal process and hearings until his release on 28 August 2020.

Requesens' detention has been condemned by the National Assembly – as well as international diplomats, politicians and organizations – and large protests have been held in Venezuela demanding that he be freed. (Note: For national and international reaction to the detention of Requesens, see the Responses section of this article) His relatives and fellow politicians have stated that he was arrested for criticizing Maduro. The National Assembly condemned the detention of Requesens as a forced disappearance. Voice of America writes that Requesens' detention has become symbolic of human rights abuses in Venezuela.

The Twitter hashtag "#YoMeNiegoARendirme" – Spanish for "I refuse to give up" – became a popular slogan for his case, and a creed for the opposition.

== Drone attack ==
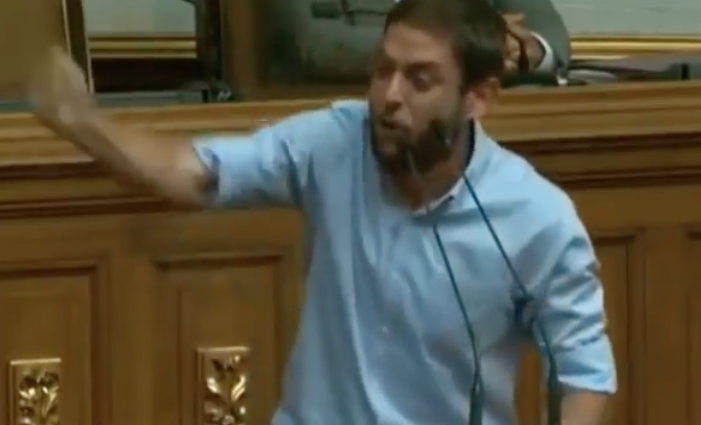
Requesens speaking in the National Assembly shortly before his arrest

On 4 August 2018 several explosions were heard while Maduro was giving a speech on Avenida Bolívar, Caracas; the explosions were labeled by the Venezuelan government as an assassination attempt, and people in the area were arrested. One of those arrested, Juan Monasterios, was interrogated on video and allegedly implicated Juan Requesens in a plot to assassinate Maduro.

Requesens was a student leader during the 2014 Venezuelan protests against Maduro. At the time of his arrest, he was an opposition leader serving as a deputy for the Justice First party in the Venezuelan National Assembly.

On the day of his arrest, Requesens had given a speech in Venezuela's National Assembly blaming Maduro for causing unrest in the nation, saying:

"I refuse to give up, I refuse to kneel in front of those who want to break our morale. Today I can speak from here, tomorrow I do not know. What I want to reaffirm is that we are going to continue doing everything we can to take Nicolás Maduro out of power."

Observers found reason to believe that the supposed attack would be used by the government to justify suppressing the opposition and that Requesens has been a victim of this. The BBC reported on harsher accusations, saying that "some government critics" believed the attack was a farce, with Julio Borges in particular arguing that this was done in order to arbitrarily arrest opposition politicians. Within Latin America, reports look at the speed of proceedings following the attack through a suspicious lens, proposing specific reasons why critics see the attack as designed to allow more government repression. The Brazilian G1 suggests that the almost-immediate connection made by Maduro between the attack and his "same old enemies" (Colombia and the United States), showing no real investigation, strengthened the idea that the attack was a farce, whilst the Peruvian La República does not present a view of why or how the attack happened, but says that the response shows Maduro as "a desperate dictator" who will accuse anyone, and that the most damning evidence is the speed of the police in finding the supposed attackers, as the police force in question is otherwise known for being inefficient.

== Arrest ==
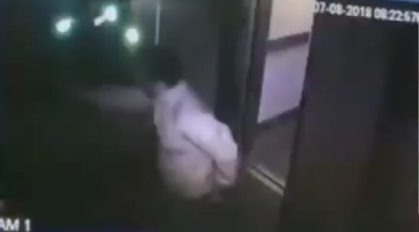
Requesens holding his arm against SEBIN agents during arrest

On the evening of 7 August Requesens and his sister, Rafaela Requesens, were detained in their residence by the Bolivarian National Intelligence Service (SEBIN), Venezuela's intelligence agency. Rafaela – following in her brother's footsteps as the president of the student union at the Central University of Venezuela – was later released, while Juan was arrested. Rafaela said there were fourteen agents who accosted the pair within a minute of arriving at their apartment building; during the arrest, one turned the building's security camera to face the wall. The BBC reported on a tweet showing the closed circuit camera "footage of the two siblings getting out of the lift before being apparently pushed back by armed masked men in uniform". For five days after his arrest, no information was given to Requesens' family or to the public about him or his whereabouts; the family first got a phone call from him on 12 August.

Efecto Cocuyo reported multiple irregularities in the arrest. Requesens was arrested without a warrant, his parliamentary immunity as a legislator was not respected, and his family did not know where he was for five days. The government said that the arrest was made in flagrante delicto, which is reserved for those who are apprehended whilst committing or having obviously just committed a crime; however, Requesens was arrested three days after the supposed attack.

Rafaela later said that their shared home had been broken into and raided by at least forty SEBIN agents who tried to plant evidence.

=== Prison videos ===
Requesens was held at El Helicoide, a detainment center operated by SEBIN and described by The Guardian as a "high-profile prison for political detainees" where prisoners report "people being beaten, electrocuted, hung by their limbs, forced into stress positions and forced to plunge their face into a bag of faeces and breathe in".

Requesens was interviewed on video and gave a statement which sources say was forced, and with no defense counsel. The Venezuelan Minister of Communication, Jorge Rodríguez, had the video broadcast by national television during a press conference on 10 August. Requesens' father said "that is not my son"; behaviour expert Isabel Pereira Pizani commented that he appeared to be reciting, not speaking for himself.

Rodríguez alleges that Requesens collaborated in the assassination attempt; in the video, Requesens allegedly admits to working with several other people accused of being involved. On video, he says that Julio Borges contacted him asking for "a favour" to "help a person get from Venezuela to Colombia", that the person was Juan Monasterios and that he and Monasterios wrote to a Colombian immigration official, Mauricio Jimenez, who had agreed to help with Monasterios' passage. Requesens gave no details of an attack on Maduro. Rodríguez said that the statements supposedly show the involvement of Julio Borges and former Colombian President Juan Manuel Santos.

In a second video released shortly after the first, Requesens appears dishevelled and in underwear stained with faeces. A third video was shared days later by Maduro, showing what the government claimed was another part of the "confession" from the first video. In the third video, Requesens is seen stating that Borges gave him the contact "Russo [...] who confirmed that Juan Monasterios was already in Colombia"; "Russo" refers to a suspect whose full name is Rayder Alexander Russo Márquez.

El Nacional reported that journalist Javier Mayorca spoke to Villca Fernández, a former political prisoner held at El Helicoide, in Peru. Fernández confirmed to the blog Crímenes sin castigo that one of the videos was recorded "in an isolation cell or in the office of Carlos Calderón", a SEBIN head. The other was recorded in "a bathroom for the use of SEBIN agents". Fernández says that the videos were distributed "as part of a campaign to psychologically break Requesens".

=== Video controversy ===
Requesens in the first video

When one of his lawyers, Joel García, saw Requesens at the preliminary hearing and mentioned the video confession to him, Requesens said he was unaware of it. Delsa Solorzano, a National Assembly deputy and spokesperson, stated that Requesens told his lawyer "that he did not remember anything, that he does not remember having recorded any video, much less said anything in that video". Because of this, the Venezuelan legal ombudsman said that they would open an inquiry about the video, and neither this video nor any video was submitted as evidence or added to Requesens' file.

García said that his client did remember the second video, and explained that Requesens said guards gave him the stained clothes and told him to wear them so that they could "mock him". Tarek William Saab, de facto Prosecutor General of Venezuela, denied this, saying that the video was a recording of Requesens during a forensic examination performed when he was in prison and that it should not have been released.

Members of the Justice First party, to which Requesens belongs, said with certainty to journalists that Requesens had been drugged to get a statement and that the torture continued to the point of incontinence. They accused the government of drugging and torturing Requesens into making a false confession. The party also said that Requesens had been threatened by his torturers that they would murder his parents and rape his sister. Legislators in opposition to Maduro's government protested against the "humiliation" of Requesens.

Voice of America reported that a clinical analysis concluded there was evidence of "alteration of cognitive conditions that could be associated with the use of drugs that affect consciousness or will, uncoordinated movements, pupillary dilation, as well as loss of autonomic functions such as sphincters". Politician and doctor José Manuel Olivares later suggested the drug was "evidently scopolamine". Borges said in an interview that the video showed Requesens "totally drugged. In these impressive photos you can see that he is [trying to] support himself, cannot hold [himself up], and has dilated pupils." NTN24 said Requesens appeared visibly "drugged, beaten, threatened", and that "as Venezuelans we must feel anger, pain and indignation [at the treatment of Requesens]".

The Bar Association of Venezuela released a statement saying they had "numerous and very grave objections" to what La Patilla called an "arbitrary and illegal" arrest and an attempt to "stigmatize" the accused. It objected to the dissemination of the videos, an act it described as "obscene, protuberant, impudent, and even boastful". The association said it would seek legal action against the government and those involved in the Requesens case, "once the rule of law has been restored".

Diego Scharifker, a friend of Requesens and a former city council member and student leader from Caracas, called the public airing of the videos "part of a macabre show meant to intimidate the political opposition".

=== Hearings ===
At his first hearing, Requesens said: "Since I got into politics I knew this could happen. And that I could lose my life and liberty. I will not lower my face, I do not have any reason to ask for forgiveness. I have always sought the exit of this Government in a constitutional manner, not in a violent manner. They will not bend me."

"Desde que me metí en política sabía que esto podía pasar. Y que mi vida y libertad podía dar. No bajaré la cara, no tengo por qué pedir perdón. Siempre he buscado la salida de este Gobierno de manera constitucional, no de manera violenta. No me doblegarán."

— Juan Requesens

Efecto Cocuyo stated that Requesens' first hearing should have occurred within 48 hours, according to Article 44 of the Constitution of Venezuela. Unnecessary delays in hearings have occurred since the original hearing – scheduled for 10 August 2018 – was deferred. At his two-day hearing on 13–14 August, Requesens was represented by lawyers Charity Flores, Alejandra Tosta and Joel García. The charges against him were:

- Treason
- Attempted magnicide (assassination of a Head of State) of Nicolás Maduro
- Attempted murder of seven National Guardsmen
- Terrorism
- Conspiracy to commit a crime
- Repeated incitement of the public
- Illicit possession of arms and munitions

Requesens declared that he was innocent, was denied bail, and was returned to prison. His bank accounts were frozen and his assets confiscated. He faces up to 30 years in prison if convicted, Venezuela's maximum sentence. Six other alleged participants of the attack on Maduro were present and had their cases heard at the same time.

Requesens' next court hearing was scheduled for 18 December 2018, but was deferred until January, in an act that lawyers described as "orchestrated" in line with the nation's use of court deferrals to keep political prisoners incarcerated indefinitely; lawyer García had beforehand mentioned that the courts closed on 14 December. The hearing was set for 24 January 2019. Requesens' family encouraged people to attend the hearing, and for the 23 January demonstrators to march on the Supreme Court building. In preparation for the hearing, García was given access to the file on the drone attack, and told reporters that though it was 219 pages, only 35 lines of the file related to his client, noting that 14 of those related to his past social media and that the "presented evidence has nothing to do with Juan Requesens". The 24 January hearing was also postponed.

On 22 February, Requesens was again transferred to Venezuela's court at the Palacio de Justicia de Caracas for a hearing that was postponed to 8 March on the reasoning that it was too late in the day to begin it. García said there were now 17 charges being presented, and that the hearing should have been rescheduled for the next day according to Venezuelan law. Requesens was forbidden from speaking to his attorney, and a member of the defense team was expelled from the courtroom for communicating with their client. Requesens was able to send a message to his attorney, saying, "If I have to be imprisoned for defending those who do not have health, for defending the youth of the resistance, for defending Venezuelans, I will be imprisoned 20,000 times because I will do it again."

On 1 April 2019, Requesens' hearing was deferred for the fourth time. On 5 April, his preliminary hearing was deferred for the fifth time, until 9 April. On 12 April, it was postponed again. On 6 May, the security services also prevented a hearing by not transferring Requesens to the court. The preliminary hearing finally occurred on 11 June, with the conclusion given by the judge on 1 July 2019. Reporting on 2 July, the BBC say that from this hearing, Requesens was set to be charged, but that no trial date was set; the judge also ordered that Requesens remain detained until his trial.

On 20 November 2019, Amnesty International reported that Requesens trial was set for 25 November. The trial began on 2 December 2019, after what Amnesty International described as "repeated undue delays and irregularities". However, it was interrupted and set to continue on 4 December. Convening the trial on this day was also delayed, but started, before being suspended again and set for 12 December. The trial had not continued by 17 December. On 20 December, the next trial day was set as 8 January 2020; his lawyer explained that the defense had not been allowed to speak, and said that "the judge simply follows instructions to keep Requesens deprived of his freedom".

=== Prison conditions and health ===
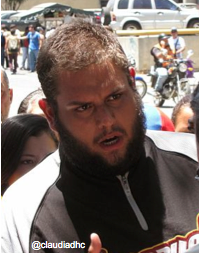
Requesens in 2014

Requesens' family said that they had been in contact with him on 12 August, and that he told them of his condition and the lack of bathroom and hygiene facilities. His lawyer said on 22 August that Requesens has "become deteriorated because of the poor conditions he is isolated in", but that "his morale is high" and "he knows he is innocent and that his fight is worth it".

Speaking in the weeks following his son's arrest, Juan Guillermo Requesens (Juan's father) expressed concern that Juan "has a special condition" that requires him to take a "regime of certain nutrients". The Requesens family doctor, Ricardo Alfonso, agreed, referring to "patients like Requesens" as a bariatric patient with a metabolic syndrome and hypertension, thyroid and insuline problems, saying that such people "need sun for at least 20 minutes every day, to take vitamin supplements, and have regular medical control". He added that without good treatment, Requesens could die, likely within two months, and that to be given drugs, even a small dose, would destroy his stomach. Alfonso added that Requesens' need for medical treatment was especially pertinent, because he also suffers from a compromised immune system.

Rafaela said that the family had still not seen her brother as of 30 August, and that SEBIN were not allowing them to give him his diet; their mother took his food to the prison every day, but it was only accepted by guards when the media was watching. They asked the media to maintain a constant presence outside El Helicoide. When the family presented an information packet on Juan's health to the International Red Cross on 31 August, Juan Guillermo spoke to the press about the 43 other people who have been incarcerated for the same crimes.

The Venezuelan government gave a presentation on 4 October 2018 at the 169th session of the Inter-American Commission on Human Rights (CIDH), and used previously unseen, professionally shot photographs of Juan Requesens to claim that they are benevolent to prisoners. This caused scorn and controversy, not only because of the dubious legality of Requesens' imprisonment, but also because of the curated image of his incarceration being presented when compared to the videos released prior. The images include Requesens with a trainer exercising outside, meeting his parents in a conference room, and having his blood pressure measured. The photograph with his parents was taken a week before the conference, the only visit they had been allowed.

His parents were allowed to enter the prison to see Juan on 9 October, the day after the death of Fernando Albán – a fellow Justice First politician supposedly arrested for the same crimes and who was allegedly tortured and murdered. Rafaela affirmed that he was alive, his parents had seen him, but he was in isolation and that he was still denied the hearing that was supposed to be scheduled within 45 days. García said that his client was actually shackled at the ankle, too, and unable to physically move of his own free will.

Requesens was transferred to a military hospital to see a dentist on 30 October 2018, after days of the public campaigning to raise awareness about a molar infection he had, with politicians saying that it was inhumane to not let him be treated. Concern was that the infection had compromised facial tissue, and people had only been alerted on 26 October when Requesens' parents visited and he told them himself that he had jaw aches which were being ignored. The family also said that Juan informed them that he had been tortured.

Though Requesens' trial began on 2 December 2019, he was still in prison over Christmas. His family was allowed to visit on this day, but SEBIN reportedly refused to give access to him from any visitors for 5 January 2020, the day of the National Assembly presidential election. During the 2020 COVID-19 pandemic, Requesens was diagnosed with a respiratory infection; SEBIN doctors requested that he be transferred to custody in Plaza Venezuela, but this was denied.

=== Legal rights ===
Because of Requesens' government position, he should have received political immunity. Diosdado Cabello, acting in his position as president of the Constituent National Assembly, unlawfully revoked this protection for both Requesens and his co-accused Julio Borges the day after Requesens' arrest. The Venezuelan National Assembly Vice President Julio César Reyes invoked the Constitution of Venezuela, which says that "only the Supreme Court of Justice has the authority to order a deputy's arrest, with congressional approval", in Article 200, which states that a prior decision to arrest a lawmaker must be made by the National Assembly and then approved by the Supreme Court in order to be legal.

On the day of Requesens' initial hearing, the second Vice President of the National Assembly, Alfonso Marquina, said that there would be major international consequences of Requesens' "disappearance", mentioning that Article 44 of the Constitution says that all prisoners must be given free access to their lawyers from the moment of detention for the whole process and that "this just didn't happen" in Requesens' case. On Monday 20 August, Requesens' lawyers and parents went to El Helicoide and asked to see him, but were denied permission. The lawyers tried again to see him on 23 August, and were again denied access. García declared that SEBIN were in violation of Article 49 of the Constitution by impeding Requesens' access to defense during an ongoing case.

García said on 30 August that the lawyers had not even been given access to Requesens' court file or to the details of his charges. He made that announcement on International Day of the Disappeared – a day marked across Latin America for remembrance of victims of forced disappearances. García spoke from outside El Helicoide, defining the term "forced disappearance" and denouncing how it matched the situations growing in Venezuela. The next day, it was announced that Requesens and all others imprisoned for the attack had been put into a mandatory isolation, preventing any access to them by family or by lawyers for thirty days.

== Responses ==
=== National Assembly ===
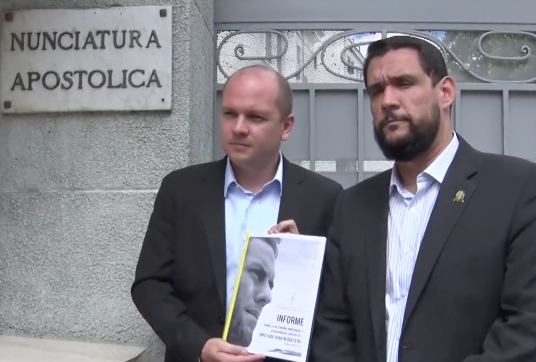
Deputies taking Requesens' case report to the Apostolic Nunciature

The Venezuelan National Assembly, the country's parliamentary body, has repeatedly denounced the arrest of Juan Requesens and asked for his release.

In shows of solidarity, a sign was secured to Requesens' seat in the assembly by other members, saying "kidnapped by SEBIN". During the 14 August National Assembly meeting, deputy Gilber Caro stripped to his underwear in front of the assembly in a move of solidarity, to make a speech saying that a man's dignity is not dependent on his state of dress. The assembly erected a large black-and-white banner hanging in the assembly hall with Requesens' face, a ribbon of the Venezuelan colours (yellow, red and blue) behind him, and the words "Liberty for Deputy Juan Requesens, kidnapped by the dictator".

On 22 August, the National Assembly demanded that Maduro at least "allow a commission of the Inter-Parliamentary Union to enter the country and verify the situation of Requesens". Deputy and lawyer Armando Armas asked that Michelle Bachelet, High Commissioner of Human Rights to the UN, urgently make a pronouncement on the case of Requesens.

With few other routes of legal recourse within Venezuela, the National Assembly took the Requesens case to the Apostolic Nunciature to Venezuela, represented by Aldo Giordano, on 24 August. They hoped to appeal to the Holy See, for which an Apostolic Nunciature operates like an embassy, to pronounce Requesens' treatment as an injustice. Later in August 2018, an agreement drafted and approved by councillors in Venezuela demanded the release of Requesens, and was sent to the CIDH.

=== Maduro administration ===
The Venezuelan government criticized the support of Requesens, in particular from international bodies. Maduro tweeted to the Foreign Minister of Chile, Roberto Ampuero that Requesens is a "self-confessed terrorist and assassin" and that "in Venezuela justice will act to protect the people, democracy, and to avoid a tragedy", saying the Chilean judicial and political systems supported such threats in their own country and others.

Diosdado Cabello denied that Requesens was abused at El Helicoide. Saab denied a planned release of the video of Requesens in his stained underwear, and said that the video was taken during a medical examination and report on Requesens. Cabello later added that Requesens was not drugged during his confession, that he was "calm" and "nobody pressured him". Constituent National Assembly member Hermann Escarrá addressed this assembly on 13 August, and told its members that there were no human rights violations conducted in Requesens' detention.

In 2016, the Minister for Prison Services, Iris Varela, had been assigned to "restructure" politics in the state of Táchira, which Requesens represented, shortly after he was elected to the position. On 12 August 2018, in response to Venezuelans growing increasingly concerned with the economy of the nation, she tweeted that people should not speculate or doubt, otherwise "they will end up worse off than Requesens, [where] they aren't able to speculate". This tweet was denounced as inhumane, for using the incarceration of Requesens as either a joke or a threat, especially since she was in charge of his conditions in prison.

=== Other Venezuelan reactions ===
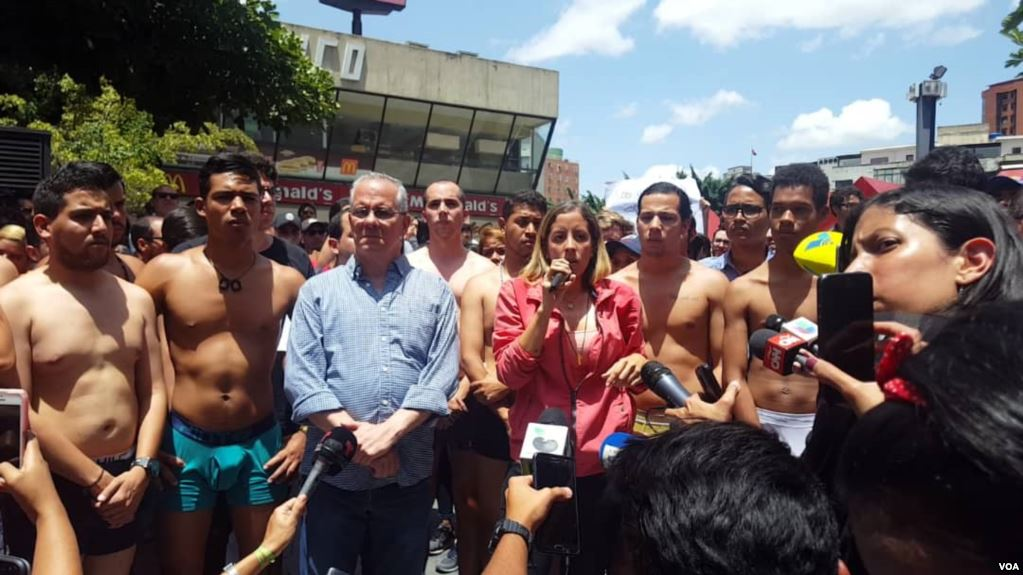
Rafaela Requesens (center), standing next to her father, speaks surrounded by protesters in underwear

The release of the prison video sparked protest, with Venezuelans taking to the streets wearing underwear in a show of support for Requesens, whose stained underwear shown in the video raised concern. One 68-year-old woman involved in a protest said that she supported Requesens because she knows he's "a good clean kid, from an honourable family". By 16 August, there were peaceful protests nationwide, joined by members of most political parties, as well as groups like Juntos por la Libertad ("Youths for Freedom"), Sin Mordaza (English: Unmuzzled), and Las Piloneras (English: The newsmongers). A group of young people in Mérida formed a blockade, preventing traffic from moving along the main viaduct across Campo Elías. A large protest march was held on 25 August, claiming to be bigger than the 2017 Venezuelan protests.

Rafaela Requesens and the Requesens family organized several marches, worship services, and protests demanding the freedom of Juan. Requesens' wife and two young children remained reclusive for many of these, but did attend a mass held in Guayana. Rafaela also said on 29 August that Juan's daughter asks her where he is. The Venezuelan activist Lilian Tintori joined forces with the family in protests.

=== International ===
On 9 August, the National Assembly held an extraordinary meeting to discuss Requesens' arrest and detention. In addition to representatives from the European Union, the session was attended by representatives from Argentina, Brazil, Canada, Colombia, Chile, France, Germany, Italy, Japan, Mexico, the Netherlands, Paraguay, Peru, Poland, Portugal, Spain, Switzerland, the United Kingdom, the United States.

US Senator Marco Rubio stated that "the rights of Requesens have been violated and his capture is further proof that Maduro and his followers want to silence their political opponents". Francisco Palmieri, a US diplomat for Latin American affairs, called the arrest the "latest example in a long litany of human right abuses". The US Embassy in Venezuela restated this, with an announcement adding that they "condemn the illegal detention of hundreds of political prisoners, many of them without due process." A number of US Senators submitted an official letter to Mike Pompeo, urging their government to intercede in Venezuela to free Requesens.

The Paraguayan government denounced the treatment of Requesens, and sent their support both to the National Assembly and to the people of Venezuela, who they told to "fight for democracy". Paraguayan senators asked their nation to take action to pressure Venezuela to free Requesens.

Roberto Ampuero, Foreign Minister of Chile, stated that "the persecution of representatives Requesens and Borges is unacceptable, as is that of every citizen that freely chooses to oppose a dictatorial and cruel regime".

British diplomats condemned the ongoing imprisoned status of Requesens at the end of October 2018. A 10 December initiative signed by members of the European Parliament called for the immediate release of Requesens. Beatriz Becerra, Vice President of the Subcommittee on Human Rights of the European Parliament, described Requesens' situation as him being "kidnapped, tortured, humiliated" and denounced that this had happened to him in particular because he had only shortly before been awarded the Sakharov Prize.

The Lima Group and its nations condemned and rejected the arrest of Requesens, calling it a "violation of due criminal process" and denouncing how it was performed irregularly and illegally by both international and Venezuelan standards. They added that it broke several regional legal standards, including the American Convention on Human Rights, the American Declaration of the Rights and Duties of Man, and the Charter of the Organization of American States. Without directly criticizing the Venezuelan government and its responsible security forces, they also expressed "deep concern" for the state of these bodies, suggesting a breakdown of democracy.

== "Yo me niego a rendirme" ==
Rafaela Requesens
(@RRequesens)
tweeted:

Spanish:

Esta familia no dejará de luchar por #Venezuela, mis sobrinos y todos los niños del país merecen un futuro lleno de libertad, justicia, seguridad y paz.

#YoMeNiegoARendirme por ellos, por mi hermano @JuanRequesens por VENEZUELA.

Translation:

This family isn't giving up the fight for Venezuela, my niece and nephew and all the children of this country deserve a future complete with freedom, justice, security, and peace.
#YoMeNiegoARendirme for them, for my brother @JuanRequesens, for VENEZUELA

21 August 2018"Rafaela Requesens Twitter" (in Spanish).

Requesens gave a speech before the National Assembly the day before he was arrested, using the phrase Yo me niego a rendirme ("I refuse to give up" in Spanish). Carlos Paparoni, a National Assembly deputy, gave a speech to the assembly the day after the arrest where he said, "let's make this our creed: 'Yo me niego a rendirme', as Juan Requesens said".

The Twitter hashtag "#YoMeNiegoARendirme" became popular; Internet messages supporting Requesens used the hashtag, and it was displayed on signs during protests. A compilation video was shared by Requesens' family and publicity team, showing supporters across the world, including countries of Latin America, the US, UK, and Spain, holding smaller signs with the slogan. The part of the speech from which the slogan was taken has been distributed as an audio file, and played at meetings of opposition political groups and as a rallying call for students and protestors.

During the protest marking one month of his detention, a mural was painted in downtown Caracas of Requesens' face with the slogan. Maduro supporters quickly plastered over the mural; Rafaela Requesens returned to the site to paint a message demanding her brother's release.

After the death of Fernando Albán in October 2018, protesters marched with signs bearing the slogan.

== Release ==
On 28 August 2020, Requesens was released from Helicoide. His sister and Henrique Capriles confirmed the release via posts on social media, including a video of Requesens with family and friends at an apartment block.

== See also ==
- Detention of Rocío San Miguel
- Human rights in Venezuela
- Political prisoners in Venezuela
- Enforced disappearances in Venezuela
- Torture in Venezuela
