= Juan Requesens =

Venezuelan politician

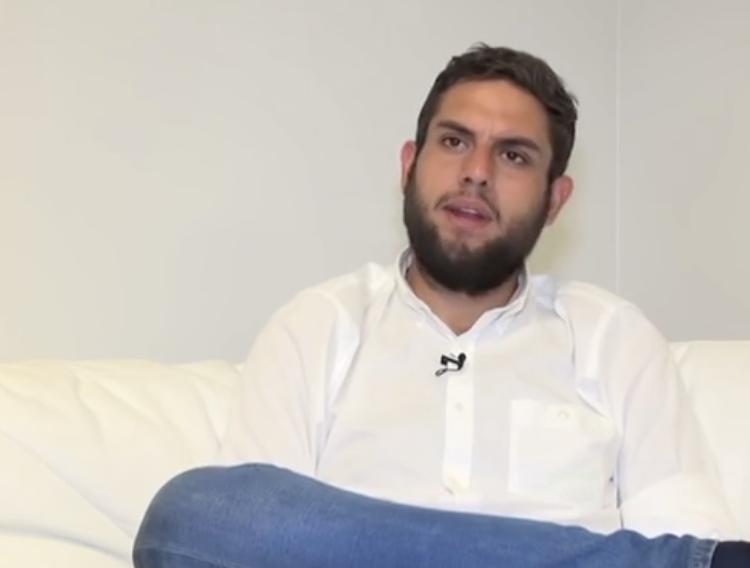
- Requesens in 2017

Deputy of the National Assembly for Táchira
- In office 5 January 2016 – 8 August 2018

Member of the Commission on Domestic Policy
- In office 18 January 2017 – 8 August 2018

President of the Commission for Social Development and Integration
- In office 18 January 2017 – 30 January 2018
- Preceded by: Miguel Pizarro
- Succeeded by: José Manuel Olivares

Personal details
- Born: Juan Carlos Requesens Martínez; March 17, 1989 (age 37) Caracas, Venezuela
- Party: Primero Justicia
- Other political affiliations: Democratic Unity Roundtable
- Children: 2
- Education: Central University of Venezuela

Juan Requesens Martínez is a deputy of the Venezuelan National Assembly, elected in 2015 and sworn in on 5 January 2016. He was a student leader at the Central University of Venezuela (UCV), and a leader of student opposition protesters during the 2014 Venezuelan protests. He led marches opposing the Government of Venezuela under President Nicolás Maduro, seeking "to turn the student rebellion into a broader social movement".

Requesens was arrested in August 2018 but was released on 28 August 2020. In 2022, he was charged eight years in prison for his alleged participation in the Caracas drone attack. He was released in October 2023 in a deal between the Venezuelan government and the United States after the latter nation agreed to ease sanctions on Venezuela.

== Student politics ==
Requesens on a TV show debating issues facing professors and students in 2013

In 2011, Requesens was elected the student president of the Central University of Venezuela (UCV), where he began his political endeavors, studying political science. Requesens began demonstrations against the Venezuelan government in January 2013 when he helped organize a joint protest of students from UCV and Andrés Bello Catholic University. He was still the president in 2014, becoming a leader for the mass protests that year, and facing threats after another student leader at the Universidad Nacional Experimental del Táchira was killed. At UCV, he used Twitter to hold student debates, and The Washington Post noted he was a talented public speaker.

Requesens said in 2014 that his political idol was former Venezuelan president Rómulo Betancourt, who is known as the "father of Venezuelan democracy". According to The Washington Post, he is a "social democrat" who believes in "equality of opportunity" and a "market economy with social goals".

=== 2014 Venezuelan protests ===
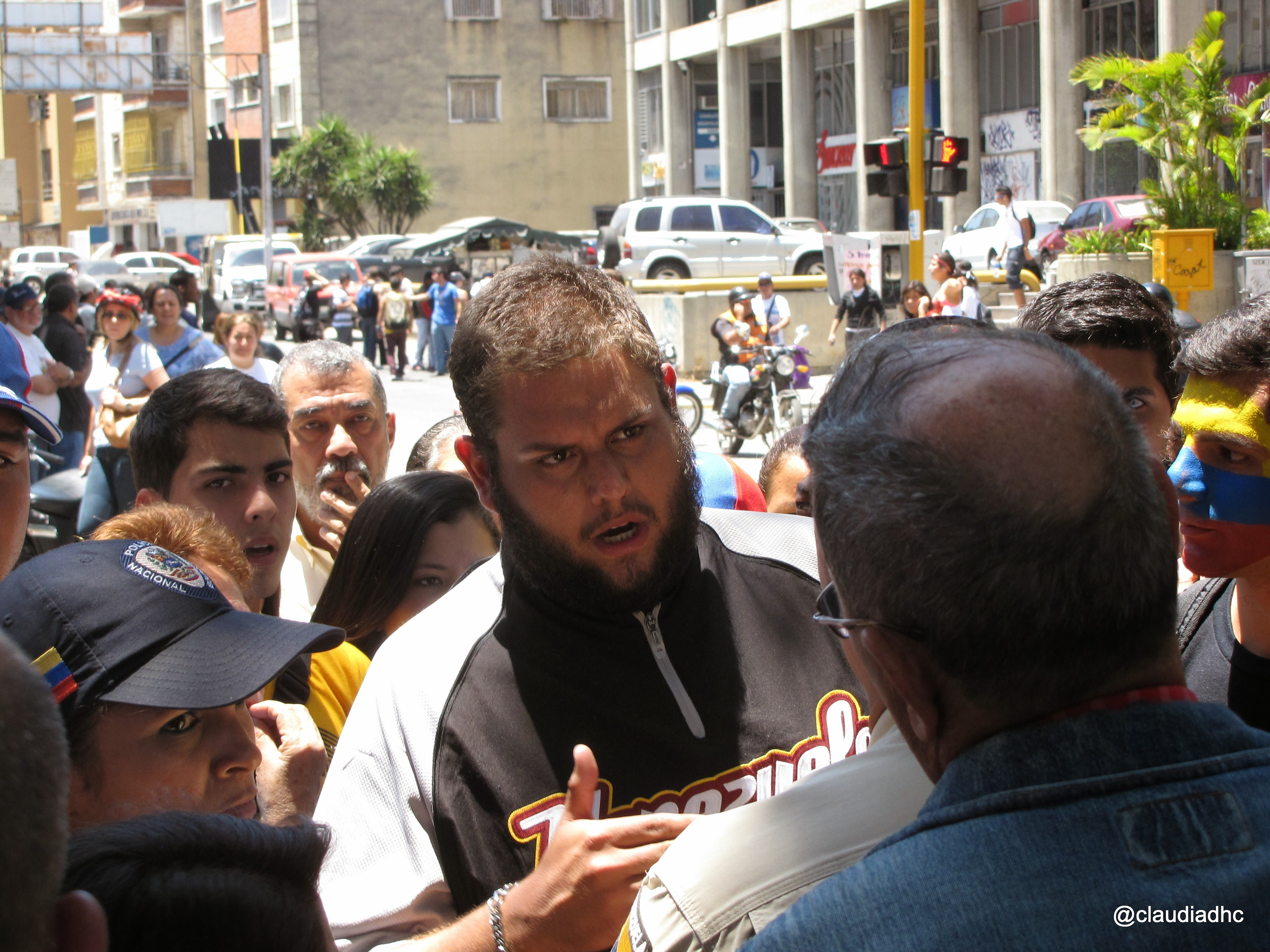
Requesens talking to a police officer during a protest in March 2014

Requesens frequently used technology to organize people; the 12,000 Twitter followers he had at the beginning of 2014 had increased to 450,000 by March, and he was able to assemble protests against the government from his cellphone.

The main demands of Requesens' movement were for the release of protesters who had been jailed and justice for protesters killed and allegedly tortured. After rising to notoriety in early 2014, Requesens was pressured by the Venezuelan government to encourage violent protestors to stand down, particularly in the state of Táchira where the violence broke out. He was also asked to attend meetings with President Maduro, but refused because of the human rights abuses; he then requested that if a meeting were to be held with Maduro, that it would be broadcast live on television. The Washington Post said that Requesens "insist[ed] that Maduro free jailed protesters and meet other preconditions" before he would meet with him. He believed then that asking for Maduro's removal as president was a "dead end" and said that the "strategy of escalating confrontation will just give the government the chance to discredit us and continue with more repression". According to The Washington Post, he was more like Henrique Capriles in "tone and strategy", and more moderated than the "hard-line wing" of opposition from Maria Corina Machado and Leopoldo López.

== National Assembly ==
Shortly after he was elected in 2015 to the National Assembly, Requesens' sister, Rafaela Requesens, and a friend, Eladio Hernández, were kidnapped by unknown parties in the state of Táchira.

Requesens was assigned to the National Assembly Commission for Social Development and Integration. In April 2016, amid teaching strikes, Requesens and Miguel Pizarro volunteered to work on the Education Law bill — which had not been developed in over a decade — to raise teachers' minimum wage and bring standards into law. By 2016, Requesens was calling for Maduro's resignation.

Requesens attempted to run for Governor of Táchira, the state for which he was already a deputy, in 2017. However, the electoral commission refused to accept pre-candidates to the ballot, and so votes in his favor were not counted, something he spoke against in the Assembly the day after the vote.

In early 2018, Requesens was part of the faction of the Assembly that formed a coalition called the Frente Amplio Venezuela Libre to ask for free elections in the country, and for Maduro to leave, saying that the opposition and country has to move forward civilly.

=== Experiences of violence ===
Requesens and Juan Pablo Guanipa were briefly detained on 30 November 2017 when they tried to cross the border to Colombia. In May 2018, Requesens was one of the politicians to step in when press personnel were being attacked by guards outside the parliamentary buildings, fighting with the soldiers; the same day, Requesens and Carlos Paparoni were attacked and held down when trying to come to the defense of journalists outside the Supreme Court. He rejoined street protests the next day, rejecting elections due later in the week.

== 2017 Venezuelan protests ==
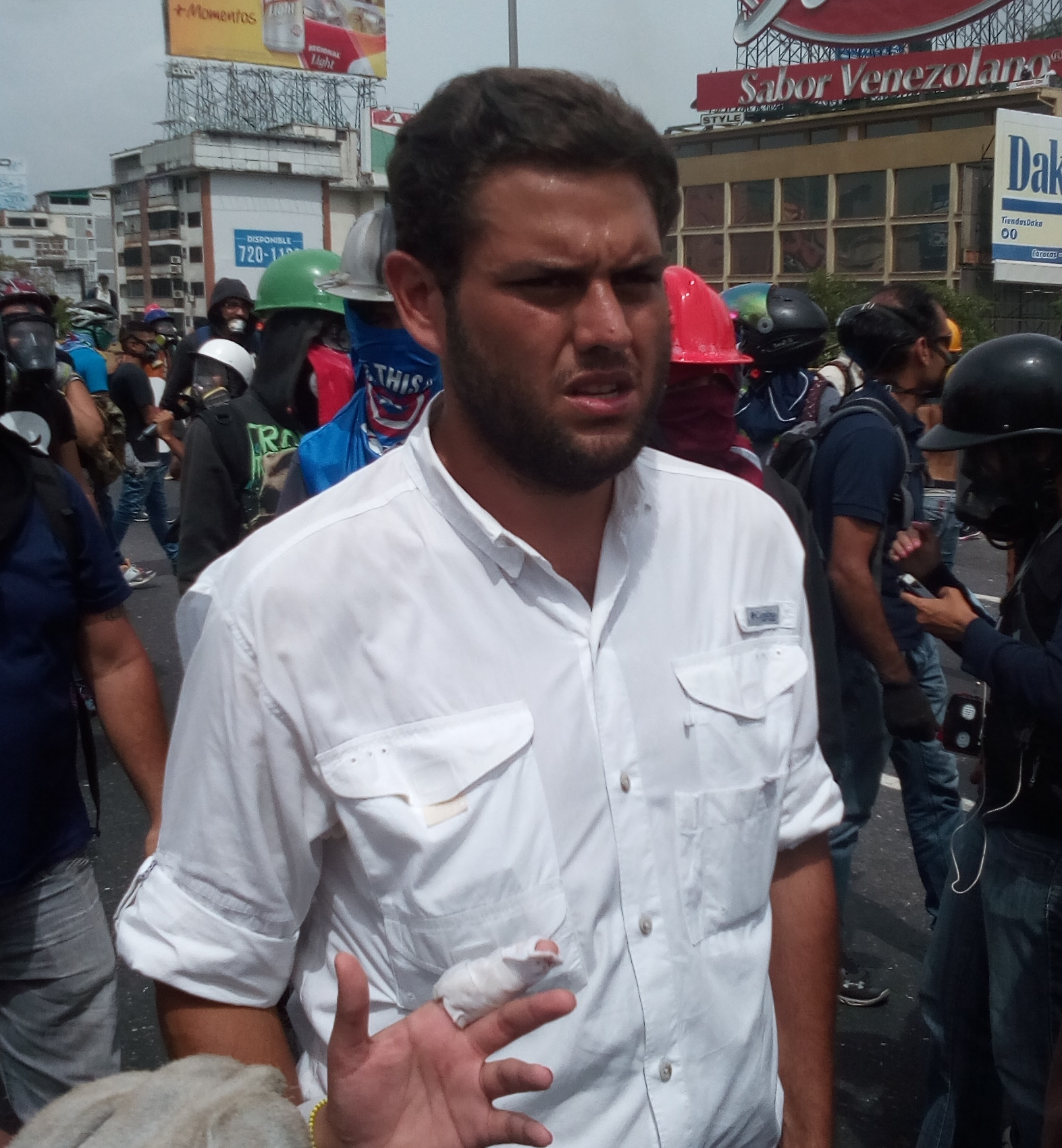
Requesens at a protest in 2017

Requesens was back on the street in 2017, now as an elected deputy. In April 2017, Requesens was with other young protestors marching on the Ombudsman's office when he was attacked, along with another deputy. He was hit in the head and received deep cuts on his face. According to José Manuel Olivares, Requesens had to have surgery to fix broken bones including his nose and jaw, and to stitch up his forehead. The march had been calling for the resignations of the Justices of the Supreme Court.

In June 2017, Requesens was again attacked, this time by members of the Bolivarian National Guard — though he referred to them as "colectivos" in an interview on Unión Radio — who then threw him down a sewer drain, as well as stealing from him and others. The Colombian government issued a communication denouncing the excessive use of violence, especially against politicians, and sought to remind Venezuelan military officials that their Constitution requires them to prevent unnecessary violence towards protestors.

== Arrest ==
On 7 August 2018, Requesens had given a speech in Venezuela's National Assembly blaming Maduro for causing unrest in the nation. In this speech, he used the saying, "I refuse to give up":

"I refuse to give up, I refuse to kneel in front of those who want to break our morale. Today I can speak from here, tomorrow I do not know. What I want to reaffirm is that we are going to continue doing everything we can to take Nicolás Maduro out of power."

Requesens was arrested that day by the Bolivarian Intelligence Service (SEBIN). He was detained as a suspect in the Caracas drone attack, an alleged assassination plot on the Venezuelan President Nicolás Maduro. The circumstances of his arrest and detention are controversial, and irregularities surround the legal proceedings. He was imprisoned in El Helicoide since his arrest, with allegations of torture to coerce a confession, (Note: For allegations of torture, see the Video controversy section at Detention of Juan Requesens) and delays impeding the legal process and hearings. He was sentenced to 8 years in prison in August 2022.

Requesens' detention has been condemned by the National Assembly – as well as international diplomats, politicians and organizations – and large protests have been held in Venezuela demanding that he be freed. (Note: For national and international reaction to the detention of Requesens, see the Responses section of Detention of Juan Requesens) His relatives and fellow politicians have stated that they believe he was arrested for criticizing Maduro. The National Assembly condemned the detention of Requesens as a forced disappearance.

The Twitter hashtag "#YoMeNiegoARendirme" – Spanish for "I refuse to give up" – became a popular slogan for his case, and a creed for the opposition.

In 2022, Requesens was sentenced to eight years in prison for his alleged role in the Caracas drone attack. Placed on house arrest, Requesens was later released in October 2023 when President Joe Biden reached a deal with the Maduro government to ease its sanctions on Venezuela.

== Personal life ==
Requesens' father is a doctor, his mother is an English teacher, and his sister, Rafaela Requesens, is an activist. Requesens is married to Orianna Granati, and they have two young children.

== See also ==
- Detention of Juan Requesens
- Fernando Albán Salazar, another PJ National Assembly deputy detained, supposedly for association to the drone attack
- Political prisoners in Venezuela
