= Rafaela Requesens =

Venezuelan democracy activist

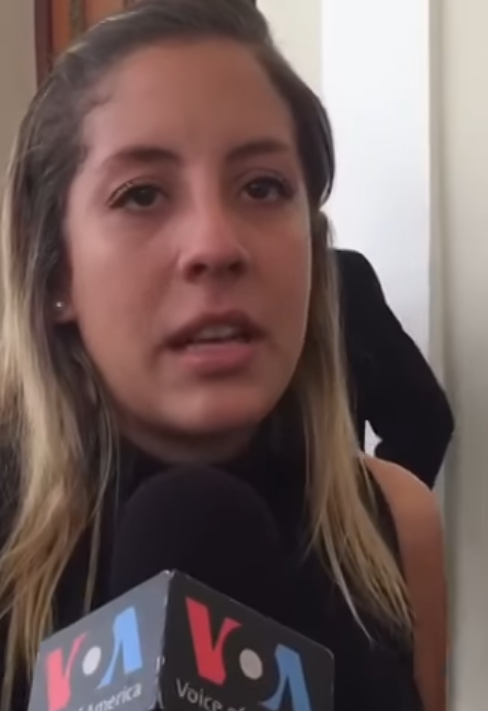
- Requesens being interviewed in 2018
- Born: Rafaela María Requesens Martínez; June 12, 1992 (age 34); Caracas, Venezuela
- Citizenship: Venezuela; Spain
- Education: Central University of Venezuela
- Family: Juan Requesens (brother)

Rafaela Requesens (Spanish pronunciation: [rafajˈela reˈkesens]; born June 12, 1992, in Caracas) is a Venezuelan activist and student leader, former president of the Federation of the Students Center of the Central University of Venezuela (FCU–UCV) and an organiser of student protests in Venezuela. She was a prominent figure of the 2017 Venezuelan protests, along with her brother, Juan Requesens, and has since become a prominent democracy activist.

== Early life ==
Requesens attended high school at the Los Riscos school. She was a flamenco dancer for fifteen years from the age of six, and wanted to pursue this as a career before facing injury due to being overweight, ultimately resulting in knee surgery after a rigorous exercise program. While she was still dancing, her brother convinced her to go to university, and she chose to study Political Studies at the Central University of Venezuela (UCV), starting in 2010. It was after her injury, which occurred during a year out, that she became interested in politics. She said in a 2017 interview that going to UCV was "the best thing that had happened to [her]".

After three years at university, she took a year off to study at the Culinary Institute of Caracas, but quickly returned to classes at UCV, saying this was because it is where her passions lay.

Requesens had five tattoos in 2017, getting her first tattoo aged 17, and has a lip piercing. When criticised for these, she has reminded people that there are politicians who are visibly tattooed, like Miguel Pizarro in Venezuela. Her favorite baseball team is Caribes de Anzoátegui.

She also took part in the 2014 Venezuelan protests with her brother, though was not a notable figure. In retrospect, she has said that during these protests she was "itching" to go out and experience it, fearlessly throwing things without really acknowledging the reality of the situation. She also said that she believes her student movement is a generation below her brother's, and that they have some criticisms of the 2014 protests.

In 2015, Requesens was kidnapped by unknown parties along with a friend of her brother, Eladio Hernández. The kidnapping occurred in the state of Táchira, for which her brother had just been elected the Representative, and was politically motivated to alarm or attack the politician.

== Student politics and movements ==
Requesens speaking to journalist Luz Mely Reyes shortly after being elected in February 2017

TSJ protest on March 31, 2017, led by Requesens

Requesens became the president of the Federation of Students of Central University on February 17, 2017, with her platform Creo en la U[niversidad] ("I believe in the U[niversity]"), and was very quickly active in protests and politics. She became only the second female student to hold the position. The elections were contentious, but externally. A few days earlier, on February 14, the Venezuelan courts had ordered the suspension of university-wide elections; the UCV votes went ahead "hoping to send a message" to the government. Additionally, detractors were throwing tear gas canisters during the voting, ultimately entering one building with tear gas bombs and gasoline before burning the place. In 2017, UCV had 31,762 students in 11 faculties and 44 schools.

Requesens named her brother Juan Requesens, a former president of the student foundation, as one of her political inspirations. Still, she has said that he was not her main reason for entering politics.

Her first protests as student leader came a month and a half after her election and were staged against the dismissal of Supreme Court judges and corruption in regional elections. One article states that she "went from organizing recreational activities, such as football caimaneras, to leading a generation". This article gave her the epithet "tirapiedras", meaning "stone-thrower", invoking the nickname to highlight her grassroots progression.

During the protests in 2017, she became more committed to activism, being thrust in with her student position, saying she had previously been "carried away by sentimentality and ideals" but in early 2017 saw young people murdered. As a comparison, she added that "in [early] 2018, Venezuela [was] much calmer", which was "frustrating", but allowed her to "get up, go to college" whilst working as a student politician. In November 2018, Requesens gave an interview where she was staying in Madrid, saying that the crisis in Venezuela had caused an exodus of students and staff at UCV, which was almost "empty". At this point, she considered the state of higher education in Venezuela "comatose".

On May 26, 2017, Requesens spoke at a memorial mass for students killed during the protests, held at the Aula Magna. Later in the day she spoke about regret and pressure as a leader, using language evocative of war, saying that "[y]ou have to take these measures, knowing that there are going to be risks, but that it can be positive for the people who will come after. It is difficult to see, that you summon your comrades and they end up injured by the repression of the state. It's so lousy, because you told them what was to be done and they go because they are 'ride-or-die' and want to fight for their country. But it's your responsibility and it hurts." Around this time, UCV adjunct professor and student politician Alfredo García said that he and Requesens "[do] not only participate in protests, but also provide support in giving [the students] political direction".

Representing the students of UCV, Requesens has taken some strong stances, including on national and international scales. In May 2018, during the process of the presidential election, she announced that the university would be among the bodies that did not officially recognise the election or its results as legitimate. In one statement shortly before the election, she explained that "there isn't the conditions that would allow you to go through the process [of challenging the election] because we are facing a dictatorship".

In May 2019, Requesens spurred student protests demanding autonomy for universities. On May 1, the rectory of the Sucre campus of Universidad de Oriente was violently occupied by Chavistas who began defacing it. Requesens visited the campus in support and issued a call "to the university community across the country" to protest because she perceived the government influence to be "taking our offices today and affecting university autonomy". She also led student walkouts at UCV in May 2019 after the university stated that classes would be ongoing despite a large number of deaths from the 2019 Venezuelan protests; medical students at the university joined in walkouts for their patients who they couldn't treat due to lack of resources. The university security accompanied the students marching down Los Ilustres to protect them from the police and national security.

=== 2019 FCU-UCV elections ===
In June 2019, during the FCU-UCV elections to choose Requesens' successor, irregularities were noted in the process.

Initially, Requesens was concerned with "violent groups" who, in the weeks before the vote, began attacking and threatening students in the faculties of the university that showed more support for Requesens' slate. A student political group in opposition to Requesens' party claimed via tweet that there was no violence on the campus, though other students were tweeting about increased violence.

A few days before the vote, the Electoral Commission announced some changes to the process, which matched the tone of other irregularities. These included a "rigged calendar"; allowing non-students to vote; not allowing Requesens' party's campaigning name ("Todos por la U") to be used on the ballot, or for votes with this name to be counted; and threatening candidates and staff. Requesens said that despite the irregularities and politicizing of the Electoral Commission, she would ensure that the election would run as fairly as possible. Two weeks before the vote, members of the Electoral Commission had been kidnapped and their offices at La Floresta were bombed with tear gas, coming in a spate of increasing violence.

Requesens, as well as the other members of her party including leader and candidate David Sosa, then made broad accusations that the opposing student group was involved in the "sabotage" and contained "representatives of the dictatorship", adding that to elect them would be to choose "death, prisoners, and corruption". One member of this opposition—former political prisoner Sairam Rivas—spoke in response, saying it was ridiculous to claim they were involved with the government and that it hurt that these words were coming from people they have protested and fought against the government with. However, an ex-president of UCV, Hasler Iglesias, said that the Electoral Commission was clearly giving a political advantage to one group.

On the voting day, 7 June 2019, there was violence that impeded hundreds of voters. Additionally, some ballot boxes were stolen and others were set on fire. The vote count before included 95% of the electorate's ballots, with David Sosa of Requesens' group having a clear lead; though a re-vote for affected students was called, the Electoral Commission said this couldn't affect Sosa's win. Sosa said that his first actions will be to investigate the electoral process.

== 2017 protests ==
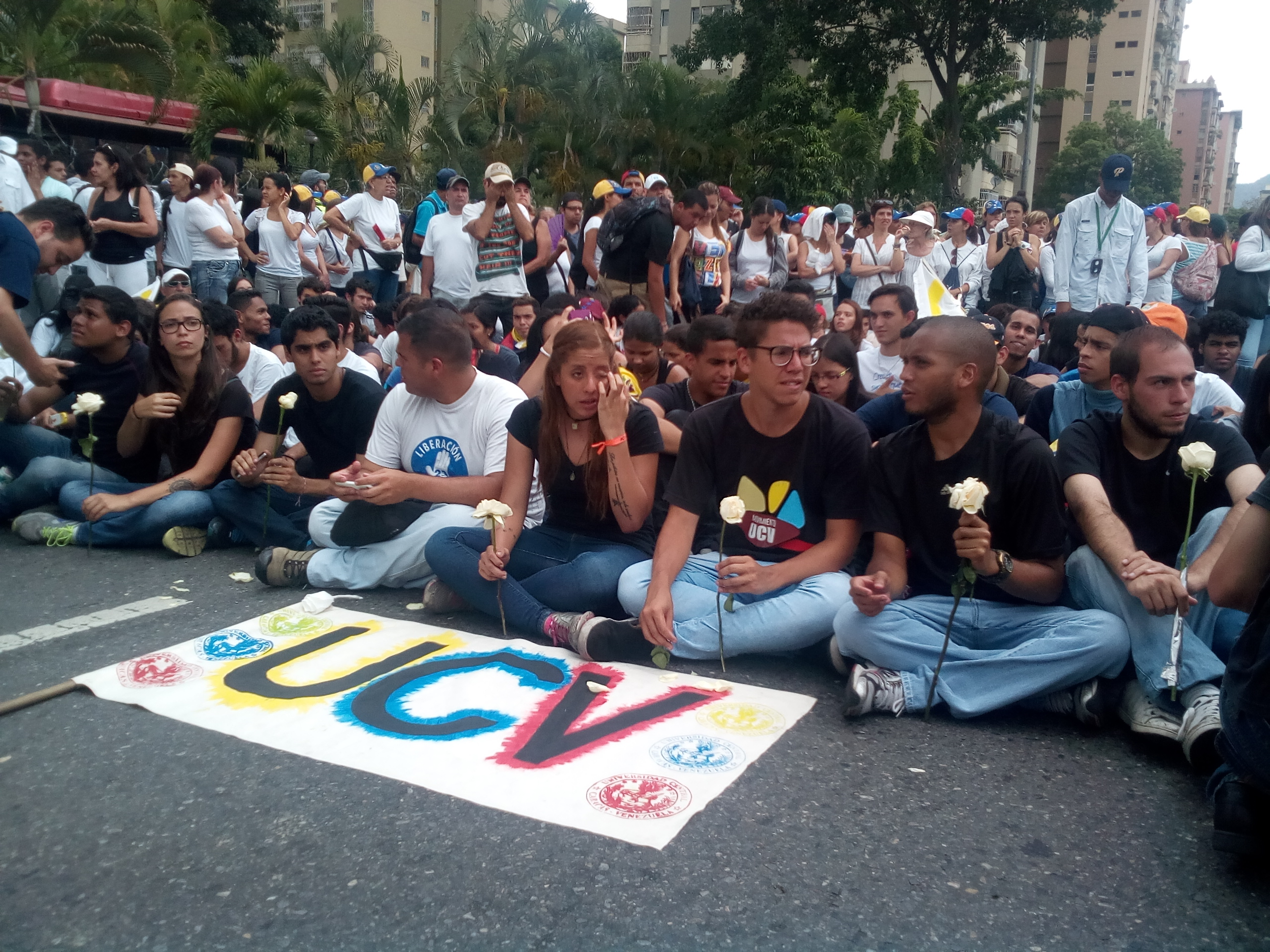
Requesens (center) at the March of Silence

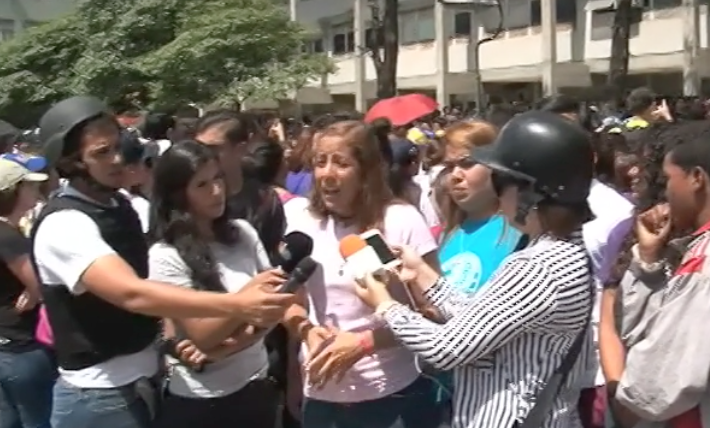
Requesens interviewed during protest outside FCU

In June 2017, the Australian Broadcasting Corporation referred to Requesens as "the face of Venezuela's youth uprising". This look into the protests notes the violence of the Bolivarian National Guard against students, and how Requesens used her words more than violence, which earned her "thousands of followers" and, from this, she "found herself leading". The reasons for the protests were varied, from the poverty in the nation to the proposed constitutional rewrite by Nicolás Maduro, as well as the announcement of the Constituent National Assembly. Requesens led a protest specifically against these latter issues, saying that the government should change instead of the Constitution. Even into July 2017, Requesens continued to state that the government "would not manage to intimidate students" – at this time, the armed forces were directly fighting back in universities.

Requesens was outspoken during various protests. During the first week of May 2017, when dozens of protesters were killed, the UCV students planned a march to the Ministry of Internal Affairs to protest these people being "murdered". When the National Guard barricaded the campus in full attack gear, throwing tear gas when students tried to escape, Requesens announced that they were being treated "like criminals [...] for no reason". The students then held a rally outside the FCU in the middle of the campus; journalists interviewing her wore the protective gear usually seen on those in war zones. It was in this week that Requesens' direct counterpart, the president of the FCU at José Antonio Anzoátegui Territorial University, was shot dead in his campus office.

On June 2, Venezuelan state television began recording an opposition student protest, speaking with Requesens and so making her the first opposition leader to be featured on a state broadcast in a long time. In the broadcast, she was seen to debate with the Minister of Communication, Ernesto Villegas.

She was also interviewed by Voice of America about a protest towards the end of June 2017, called Trancazo Nacional (National Roadblock), organised by the Democratic Unity Roundtable. Several trancazos took place at this time, including some organised by students. The trancazos grew and involved many regular citizens, not only in Caracas, but also across the country. Requesens called it a "positive example" of the change she was trying to bring to the country, because it engaged many different people in peaceful rebellion, and celebrated that during a student trancazo, Caracas and other cities had effectively been shut down for up to four hours, from a combined effort of walkouts and roadblocks. More trancazos resumed in early July 2017, after other protests in which 25 students were detained for four days for protesting. These progressively lengthened in duration, though protests at this time also shifted focus to community outreach, Requesens stating that they would continue to protest and work towards campaigning against the Maduro government in the July 16 referendum rejecting the Constituent National Assembly.

On July 7, Requesens with other UCV students further stated their support for this anti-government force, with an announcement from the National Assembly and opposition parties, as well as Requesens herself, that the students of UCV were helping to organise the public referendum that would aim to challenge the new Constituent National Assembly. She explained:

We are joining the Liberation Movement, which will be headed up by the different social sectors in the country. As students, we will play a fundamental role from here until July 16. We will act as mobilizers and promoters, we will carry the message as an organised group of local people and in the streets of the whole country.

— Rafaela Requesens, Voz de América

Requesens described her protest leadership philosophy in an interview, saying "[y]ou have a responsibility for the image they see of you. You're not going to throw anything out there. You can give support to all and, for those in front, make them feel that you're with them, that you aren't leaving them alone".

== Arrest and political activism ==
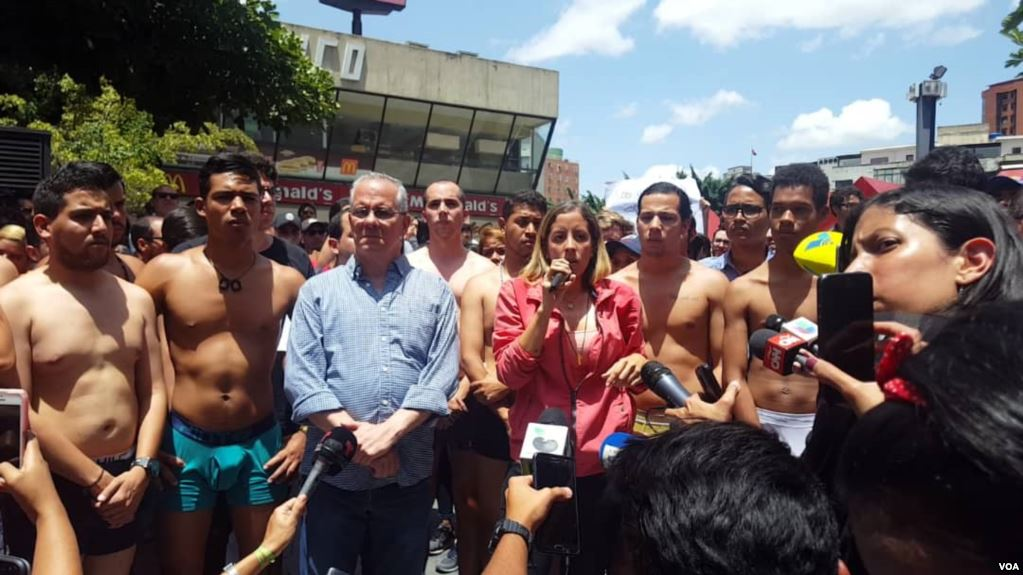
Requesens (center) at an August 2018 protest

Requesens' movement into the wider politics of Venezuela came in August 2018, after the Caracas drone attack that saw her arrested alongside her brother, in what was referred to as an "arbitrary" move to suppress political opposition. She was released shortly afterwards. She was featured in Bloomberg's "Week in Pictures" on August 9, 2018, due to the global status her position had suddenly achieved. Though not a deputy herself, Requesens is associated with the Justice First party to which her brother belongs. After the arrest, the party released an urgent statement that denounced the arrest of both Juan and Rafaela as a "kidnapping".

It was after this event that Rafaela took another leadership role in the protests, demanding the release of her brother as well as the return of democracy and an improved nation. In the days following her release, Requesens spoke several times in the National Assembly and to media about the issues in Venezuela. She also said that she and her brother had been targeted because "the government is scared of young people". With protests arising in the nation, Requesens took a leadership role to organise such efforts, asking Venezuela to unite. In some of these protests, such as the underwear demonstration in Plaza Brión, Requesens helped lead students and faculty from UCV alike.

Requesens spoke at a United States government hearing on the situation in Venezuela on 7 March 2019, also announcing that she was to receive an award in the International Women's Day honors the next day. She received the Jeane J. Kirkpatrick Award from the Women's Democracy Network, being one of three awarded such in 2019 (the others were Liz Cheney and Lilian Tintori). In her speech, she said that "As a woman and a young Venezuelan, I must keep fighting for our country [...] day by day there are more and more young women setting an example for others and joining this fight."

== 2019 protests ==
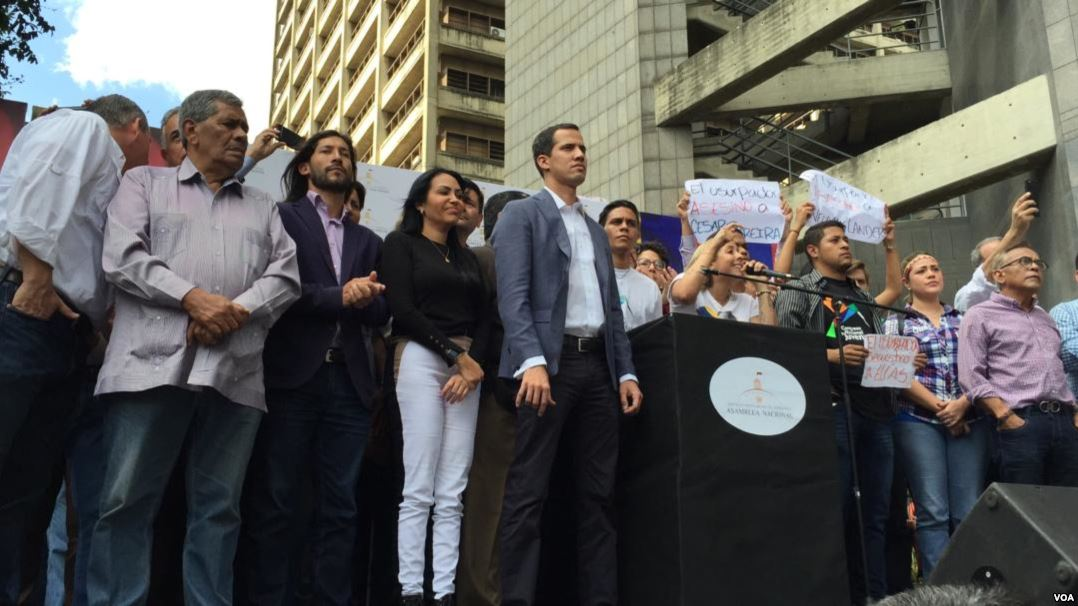
Requesens speaks on 11 Jan. at a rally fronted by Juan Guaidó

Shortly after the election of Juan Guaidó as the National Assembly President, and with Maduro refusing to step down as President, Requesens led students in a protest co-hosted by Guaidó's Popular Will party, calling Maduro a "usurper" and closing off roads. The day after, on 11 January, Requesens spoke at the open cabildo organized as the first step in a plan to oust Maduro, where she represented the students of Venezuela along with Marlon Díaz. She asked for people of all political affiliations to work together and with the supportive foreign governments in order to "restore democracy". There was a youth rally, which attracted protestors of many ages, held in recognition of Guaidó at the FCU on UCV's central campus on 21 January, where Requesens spoke among other student leaders, Guaidó, and Miguel Pizarro. Interviewed by The Guardian on 30 January, Requesens said that the opposition "do not seek confrontation" and that the protests were "not a fight between Chavistas and the opposition; [they're] a fight for Venezuela".

== See also ==
- Political prisoners in Venezuela
