= Tacarigua =

Tacarigua may refer to:

== Trinidad and Tobago ==
- Tacarigua, Trinidad and Tobago, a town
- Tacarigua River, or Caura River
- Laguna de Tacarigua National Park

== Venezuela ==
- Tacarigua, Nueva Esparta, a town
- Tacarigua de Mamporal, Miranda, a town
