= Paparone =

Paparone is a surname. Notable people with the surname include:

- Marco Paparone (born 1994), Australian rules footballer
- Giovanni Paparoni (died c. 1153/1154, sometimes known as Giovanni Paparone), Italian cardinal

== See also ==
- Paparoni
