= 2018 Caracas drone attack =

Attack on President Maduro

Caracas drone attack
- Part of the crisis in Venezuela
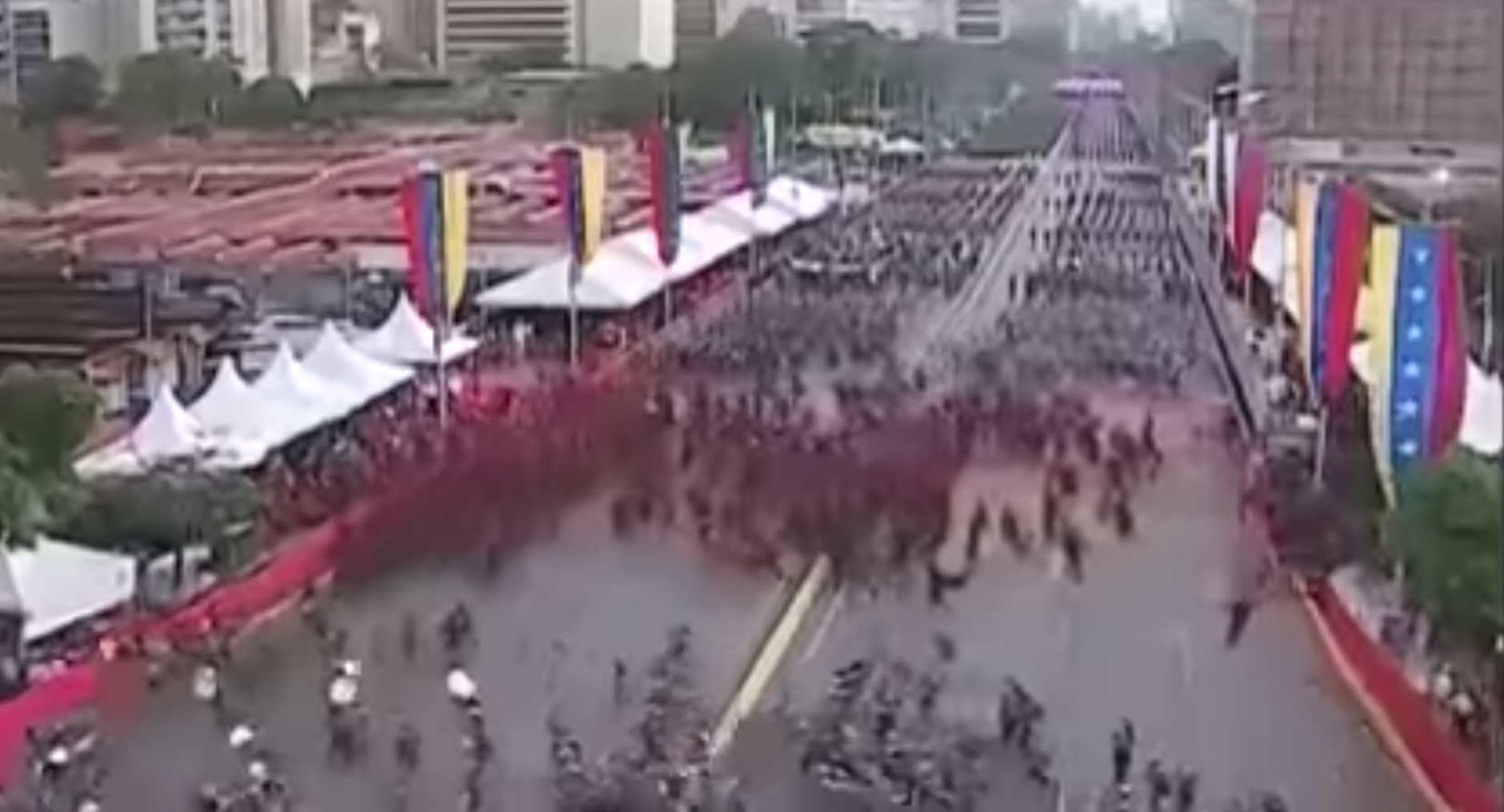
- Venezuelan troops retreating from the area

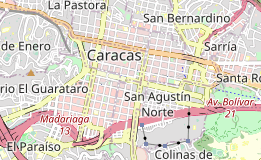
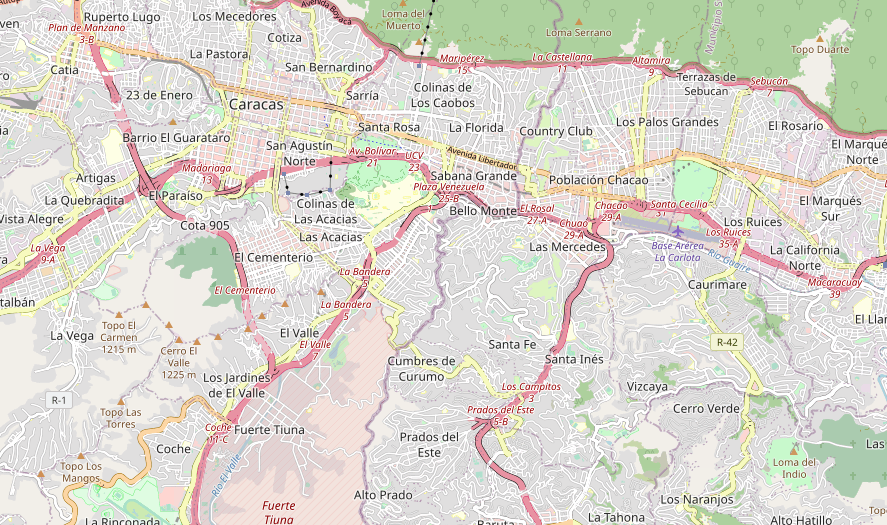
- 2018 Caracas drone attack (Central Caracas) 2018 Caracas drone attack (Caracas) 2018 Caracas drone attack (Venezuela)
- Location: Near Avenida Bolívar, Caracas, Venezuela
- Date: 4 August 2018; 5:41 p.m (VST UTC −04:00)
- Weapon: 2–3 DJI M600 drones
- Deaths: 0
- Injuries: 8–9 (7–8 military, 1 civilian)
- Accused: Juan Requesens (alleged)
- Charges: Multiple charges, listed; Treason; Aggravated murder; Attempted magnicide; Inciting a riot; Launching an explosive; Terrorism; Violent damage of property; Conspiracy to commit a crime; Financing terrorism

On 4 August 2018, two drones detonated explosives near Avenida Bolívar, Caracas, where Nicolás Maduro, the president of Venezuela, was addressing the Bolivarian National Guard in front of the Centro Simón Bolívar Towers and Palacio de Justicia de Caracas. The Venezuelan government claims the event was a targeted attempt to assassinate Maduro, though the cause and intention of the explosions is debated. Others have suggested the incident was a false flag operation designed by the government to justify repression of opposition in Venezuela.

== Incident ==
Two small drones carrying explosives were detonated while President Maduro delivered an outdoor speech, possibly in attempt to attack the president and other government officials. The incident occurred in the middle of a speech he was giving commemorating the Bolivarian National Guard's 81st anniversary. The first drone hovered over Avenida Bolivar (Bolivar Avenue), detonating in the air over National Guardsmen standing in ranks. It was reported that seven National Guard officers involved in the parade were injured and treated in a hospital, other sources later claim it was eight. After the explosion, bodyguards immediately protected Maduro with ballistic shields. Maduro, his wife Cilia Flores, and Defense Minister Vladimir Padrino López, who were standing next to him, left the scene unharmed. A second explosion was then heard seconds later – hundreds of National Guardsmen fled the area, abandoning President Maduro, and the broadcast of the event was cut. Despite the images of National Guardsmen fleeing the scene that were broadcast to the public, Minister of Communication Jorge Rodríguez falsely stated that the troops maintained their ranks in the parade.

A second drone crashed into the Don Eduardo apartment block, located two blocks from where Maduro was speaking. Local journalists and residents shared images of smoke appearing from the apartment building's windows shortly after the incident. A woman living in the building said that a drone had crashed into one of the building's windows, injuring a girl who was taken to hospital.

Video footage shows two drones; amateur video of one drone exploding, a video showing few people in the area, and another video recorded by Telemundo cameraman Cesar Saavedra of a drone hitting the Don Eduardo apartment building.

Many members of the press were arrested immediately after the incident, preventing independent investigations and reporting. Reporters from VIVOplay and TVVenezuela were detained by National Guardsmen shortly after the incident.

== Investigation ==
=== Government ===
==== Initial ====
In a televised address to the nation two hours after the incident, Maduro stated that an investigation had been opened immediately and a number of those connected to the attack had been apprehended and charged. Eleven journalists were detained during the attack and released afterwards. Six other suspects were initially arrested within hours of the incident, which later increased to seven. Reportedly, one of these was known to authorities because of his involvement in the 2014 protests, whilst another had an arrest warrant out for apparently taking part in the assault on Fort Paramacay.

President Maduro also laid blame on extreme right-wing elements in his own country acting together with extreme right-wing elements in neighbouring Colombia, and specifically named Colombian President Juan Manuel Santos as being behind the incident. A spokesperson for President Santos promptly denied the accusations. Maduro also suggested that Venezuelan exiles in the United States, particularly Miami, Florida, may have been involved.

According to Interior Minister Néstor Reverol only two DJI M600 drones were used, though Minister of Communication Jorge Rodríguez said that there were three drones used during the incident, and the reason they failed to reach their target was that radio inhibitors made them lose signal. Police at the scene had previously said that authorities shot down a drone. Following a brief initial two-day investigation, Reverol presented his findings and explained that the two drones he claimed were involved were loaded with over 4 lb (1.8 kg) combined of C4 plastic explosive, and that one was to be exploded above Maduro's head with the other was intended to explode directly in front of him. In one presentation, Maduro showed debris that he said showed the drone by the stage was carrying gunpowder and lead, and that the drone that hit the building was loaded with C4 and gunpowder.

On 6 August 2018, Prosecutor General of Venezuela, Tarek William Saab, announced that two individuals alleged to be the drone pilots were arrested and "will be charged with the crimes of treason and intentional homicide" in addition to other crimes.

==== Post-arrests ====
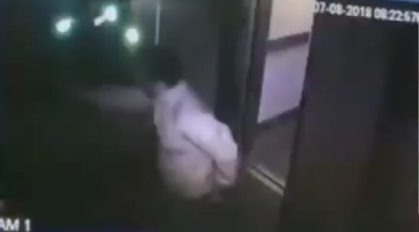
Requesens holding his arm against SEBIN agents during arrest, while the camera is being turned away

Shortly after midnight VST on the morning of Tuesday, 7 August, Maduro said that he had "hard evidence" of "the Colombian oligarchy" planning the assassination, and that he would share it "in the next few hours". Maduro announced in a video at the same time that they now knew that the perpetrators were trained during April and June 2018 in Chinácota in Norte de Santander, Colombia, an area which borders the north of Venezuela. In this video he also said that he had been informed that Juan Manuel Santos had told former Spanish Prime Minister Mariano Rajoy that Maduro would be gone before he left office. The promised report had not surfaced by the afternoon.

In the evening, Maduro gave a two-hour television presentation from Miraflores Palace which included a partially-censored video of former Venezuelan security official Juan Carlos Monasterios Vanegas, who said he was one of the "bombers", giving a statement blaming Julio Borges and Juan Requesens. President Maduro directly accused opposition leaders Borges and Requesens of being behind the incident, also saying that Borges lived in a mansion in Bogotá that the outgoing Colombian government paid for, though no details of his "alleged role" were revealed. During this time, agents belonging to the Bolivarian National Intelligence Service (SEBIN), Venezuela's intelligence agency, arrested Requesens and his sister, student leader Rafaela Requesens, though the latter was later released. In the video, Monasterios claimed Requesens told him "to kill the President".

As members of the Venezuelan National Assembly, Borges and Requesens received parliamentary immunity. The arrest of Requesens was described as a violation of the Constitution of Venezuela, specifically Article 200 which states that "only the Supreme Tribunal of Justice, subject to authorization in advance from the National Assembly, shall have the power to order their arrest and prosecution". However, Diosdado Cabello, president of the disparate Constituent National Assembly, said he would "introduce legislation" to strip them of the protections. The protected status of the pair was then removed by the next day.

In response to the accusations, Borges tweeted a statement from Bogotá telling Maduro that he was "not fooling anybody", calling the supposed attack a "farce" that Maduro "staged to justify the persecution of opponents". Cabello responded to this, telling him to "go find some good lawyers".

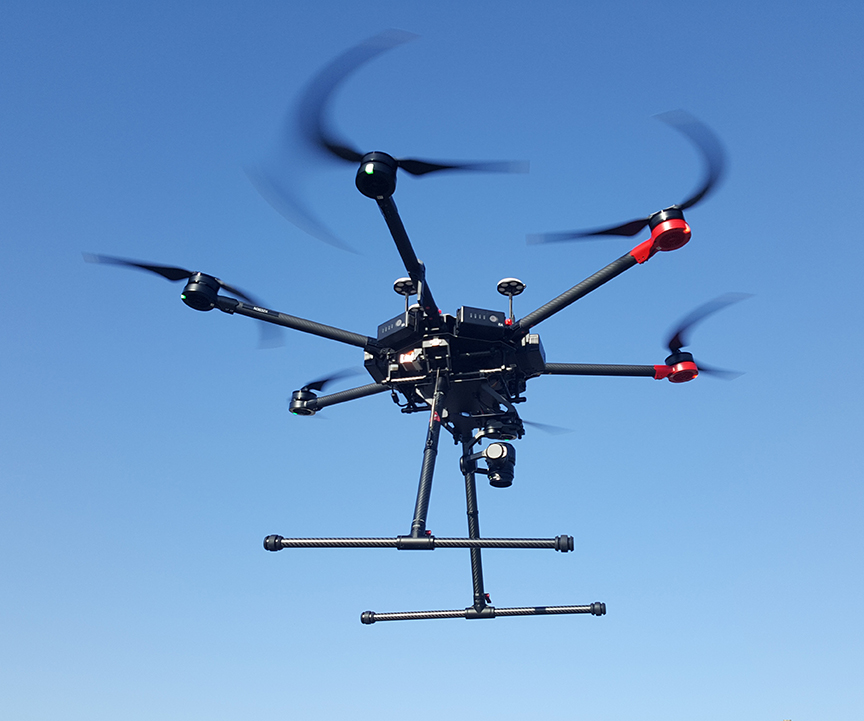
A DJI M600 drone, similar to the drone used during the incident

Maduro's evening presentation claimed that everyone involved in the attack was offered $50 million USD as well as United States citizenship status. He also said that they had planned an attack on 5 July, which was postponed due to the drones not arriving on time. Two of those who were arrested and named by Maduro as being involved and providing evidence were a Colombian, Rayder Russo, who was accused of being a planner and financier of the alleged attack, and an American, Osman Delgado, who was accused of being another financier. Both Russo and Delgado were known by the Venezuelan resistance to be informants loyal to Maduro, with rebel leader Óscar Pérez previously revealing that the two were "moles" selling information to the Bolivarian government in December 2017.

On Wednesday, 8 August, Saab said that investigators had so far connected nineteen people to the attack, and three had already been charged. Maduro also named wanted individuals living in Colombia and the US state of Florida, saying he wanted cooperation from these two nations and that he "[trusts] in the good faith of Donald Trump". On Thursday, 9 August, Reverol said that 25 people were under investigation, and Efecto Cocuyo reported that eight had been detained. Though Borges and Requesens are leaders of the Justice First party, Reverol revealed that "the majority of the suspects are from the resistance group Come Venezuela" (sic).

Minister of Communication Jorge Rodríguez gave a national presentation on 10 August announcing that at least one of the drones involved was detonated from the United States, though a report by The Independent that was warning of drone threats said this could be done "from 5 kilometres" away only, as well as showing a supposed flight map of the drones path from Colombia all the way to Avenida Bolívar. Rodríguez also said that he had submitted a Red Notice to Interpol for the capture of "assassin" Julio Borges, and showed a video of Juan Requesens recorded in Helicoide.

==== Raids and seizures ====
One announcement of alleged perpetrators by Reverol on Thursday, 9 August, included details of several properties that the investigation had seized. They were owned by Delgado, who was accused of helping to finance the attack. Two cars and an apartment in his name were also seized and raided.

The SEBIN searched the Pestana Hotel, which is almost eight kilometers from the place of the incident, during the investigations of the events. Caracas Chronicles reported that the homes of Juan Requesens, Julio Borges and other deputies, Julio Mora and Jorge Mora, had been raided.

Rafaela Requesens, Juan's sister and student President of the Central University of Venezuela, expressed her anger that at least forty SEBIN agents broke into their house, also saying that the government wanted to plant false evidence to incriminate her brother. On 7 August, the SEBIN also raided the house of students Valeria Sosa and Luis Alfredo Sosa, from Andrés Bello Catholic University and Simón Bolívar University, respectively, and whose mother is accused of being involved in the drone attack. Roberto Rodríguez, a student leader at Andrés Bello, denounced that the raid was done without a search warrant, that the electricity was cut off from the building, that many belongings in the house were stolen, and that the family were forced to escape.

==== Requesens videos ====
External videos
- Requesens in what appears to be underwear covered in faeces on YouTube

During his 10 August presentation, Rodríguez showed a video of Requesens allegedly admitting to working with people involved in the supposed attack. In the video, Requesens named several of the suspects, including Borges, though this was limited to him saying that Borges "asked [him] for a favour to help a person get from Venezuela to Colombia". He added that this person was Monasterios and that they had written to Mauricio Jiménez, an immigration official in Colombia, for help with getting passage, who immediately offered it. Requesens gave no details relating to an attack on Maduro. The opposition condemned Rodríguez's actions, saying that Requesens was drugged and tortured into making a false confession. One source from Requesens' Justice First party assured journalists that the government drugged Requesens to obtain confessions and, when they realised he was still of sound mind, then continued to drug him until he became incontinent, as well as threatening to murder his parents and rape his sister. In a second video, Requesens is wearing only underwear which is visibly stained with faeces. Following the release of the videos, Requesens was moved from being held at the prison of SEBIN, El Helicoide, to the Palacio de Justicia. After five hours, he was returned to Helicoide with his hearing deferred and being denied to see his lawyer.

Health professionals discussed the behavior of Requesens in the videos broadcast to the public. National Assembly deputy and doctor José Manuel Olivares stated that "[t]he clinical signs of Juan Requesens show that there is an alteration of cognitive conditions, which is clinically associated with the administration of drugs that affect the conscience or the will". An independent Venezuelan psychologist, Alberto Barradas, also observed his behavior, stating in a "subjective conclusion" that Requesens appears "drugged, beaten, threatened", later saying "[a]s a Venezuelan, I think we are outraged to see the images of a deputy full of faeces, of excrement, knowing he was tortured. I believe that as Venezuelans we must feel anger, pain and indignation". In a moment of protest and solidarity with Requesens, Venezuelans demonstrated in public while wearing underwear to share moral support for Requesens, who was seen in the government's video wearing underwear covered in faeces.

Though he was originally transferred to the court building on 10 August, Requesens' hearing was deferred to Monday, 13 August. This hearing went ahead, lasting two days, and on Tuesday, 14 August he was denied bail. He was remanded in custody after being charged with seven crimes against Maduro and the State, to go on trial and face Venezuela's maximum punishment of 30 years in prison.

On 12 August, the government shared a third video of Requesens which it said was part of his confession. In the video Requesens said that he briefly had telephone contact with a man who identified himself as "Alexander", who confirmed that Monasterios had got to Colombia.

At his hearing, Requesens told his lawyer, Joel García, that he did not remember recording a confession video or any of the people he named. Requesens also told García that guards gave him the stained underwear to "mock him". None of the videos were submitted as evidence.

==== Further arrests ====
On 10 August, SEBIN arrested Luis Enrique Martínez Rico, the Coordinator of Security and Defense Commission of the United Socialist Party of Venezuela (PSUV), the government's political party. Reports stated that Martínez was arrested due to his alleged involvement in the incident. Colonel Garcia Palomo said in a 13 August statement delivered to La Patilla that "I have no connection with the events that took place in Caracas on 4 August, through the use of drones or the people who they abused, whom I do not know" (sic).

On 14 August, the number of suspects had increased to 34, fourteen of whom had been charged, with Saab saying it could rise further. It was also announced that Venezuela were now formally seeking extradition of suspects from Peru, with the government having issued 27 international arrest warrants to Interpol, as well as requesting account blocks and asset freezing for Osman Delgado and Julio Borges. On 22 August, the numbers of those implicated by the government rose again, Saab saying that 25 people had been charged with 43 total suspects involved. The previous Sunday he had named several of these extra suspects, and announced that there were now only 18 Interpol alerts out, with nine extradition orders between Colombia, the US, and Peru.

Cabello accused another deputy of the National Assembly, Ismael García, of being involved in the "conspiracy" on 15 August. García was a member of Primero Justicia with Borges and Requesens until he ran for candidacy with Acción Democrática on 10 August. García had been reportedly attracted the government's attention in the days before this, along with José Manuel Olivares, who had recently been forced into exile.

Maduro said during one speech that he knew that the attackers "were planning a transitional government" and that current politicians were intended to lead it.

=== Independent ===
One early independent investigation by NGO Control Ciudadano alternatively claimed that "at least one drone belonged to the military", and that a drone was "shot", blaming the government but indicating that it would be unintentional.

Some investigative journalism reports began appearing. Citizen journalism organization Bellingcat stated that two drones "likely" armed with explosives were involved and that "[d]espite apparent claims from one group, it is not possible to accurately attribute this apparent attack without further information".

Though various bodies and countries asked for an independent investigation to be performed in Venezuela, the practice of censorship in the nation prevented this from happening. One of the leading independent investigatory organisations in Venezuela, Armando.Info, was completely blocked in August 2018, with four of its writers also having travel restrictions imposed, barring them from leaving.

On 14 March 2019, CNN revealed new details about the plot, based on new videos.

== Responsibility claims ==
Responsibility for the attacks "has been claimed by a confusing array of spokesmen", including groups named "The Resistance", "T-shirt Soldiers" and the "Phoenix Group".

A group named Soldados de Franelas ("T-shirt Soldiers") claimed responsibility for the attack on Twitter. Another group, called Operación Fénix ("Operation Phoenix"), made vague claims on Twitter, accusing the Maduro government of being involved in drug trafficking and stating that they sought to restore democracy in Venezuela. Three hours after the attack, Venezuelan journalist Patricia Poleo read a press release on her own YouTube channel from Miami, saying that militants from the Fénix group claimed the attack. Different sources have variously claimed both groups as having connections to the Venezuelan rebel leader Óscar Pérez, who had been killed by Venezuelan government armed forces in the El Junquito raid.

Salvatore Lucchese, a former Chief of Police of San Diego Municipality, Carabobo and former member of the Popular Will opposition party, claimed in an interview with Reuters in Bogotá that he largely organized the events, adding that the "armed struggle" would continue and "no dictator leaves power peacefully". On the evening of 7 August, Maduro referred to this claim, telling the people in his two-hour national broadcast that "[a] former police boss of the Venezuelan right has been claiming responsibility for leading the attack. Today he was a special guest at the swearing-in of Colombia's incoming president". The day after, Lucchese tweeted that he "didn’t do anything" and was "one more soldier fighting for freedom".

On his Spanish-language talk show, Bayly, Peruvian-American journalist Jaime Bayly claimed that he had known about the attack during the week before and he supported it. He warned that there would be more attacks coming up.

A man who said he was a military dissident said that he had been part of a group of similar dissenters from all branches of the Venezuelan armed forces plotting a coup in Bogotá to overthrow the Maduro government, but had no plans of assassination and were not involved in the attack on 4 August, having been infiltrated and disseminated some weeks before. Instead, he says that in April a group of civilians approached his group wanting to join forces and kill Maduro, and he believes they will have performed the attack because of videos they showed of armed drones in Miami. Bloomberg gives credence to this account because of the lack of organisation that the attack appeared to have.

== Suspects and arrests ==
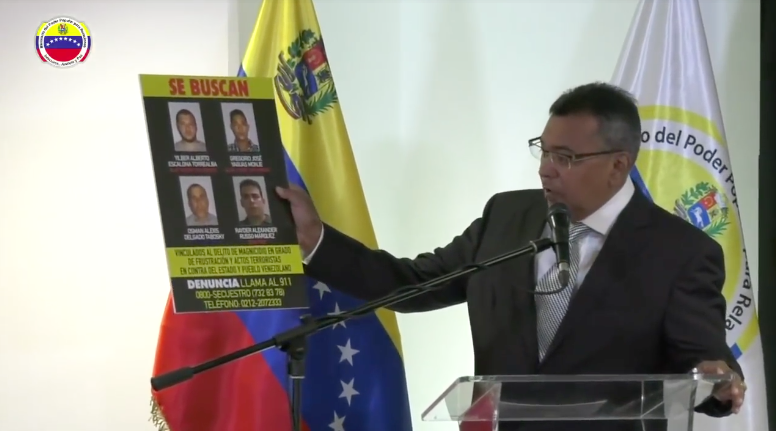
Néstor Reverol shares information on the suspects

Maduro and Reverol, acting as the Ministry of Interior, Justice and Peace, released the names of wanted people that informants named as committing the attack. The full names and photos of these people were released on wanted posters in Venezuela. El Nacional reported fifteen names on the afternoon of Thursday, 9 August. Diario Panorama and other news sources reported the addition of more names before the end of the day, and several more suspects were named and arrests were made in the following week.

On 31 August, the family of Juan Requesens went to the International Red Cross to give them information about the medical conditions of Requesens. Here, they also spoke to the media there about the other people also incarcerated, who were likely experiencing the same treatment, and noted that several of those prisoners had not even been to court. Requesens' lawyer, Joel García, also mentioned his concern for the other prisoners. The sister of Colonel Zambrano said at this time that her brother had not been seen by family or lawyers, either, and that guards had told her he wouldn't be available for thirty days. She was also concerned for the colonel's health, because his custodians had been requesting antibiotics, serums, and diuretics for him. A lawyer representing several of those accused of the attack said she had not been given access to any of them or their files.

Another Justice First deputy, Fernando Albán, was later arrested on suspicion of plotting the magnicide on Friday, 5 October. He was detained in the SEBIN HQ also, but was reported dead the following Monday, 8 October. Government officials claimed it was suicide, which was disputed. his friends, family, opposition political parties and Luis Almagro, Secretary General of the Organization of American States, argue that the councilor's death was murder.

== Reactions ==
=== Domestic ===
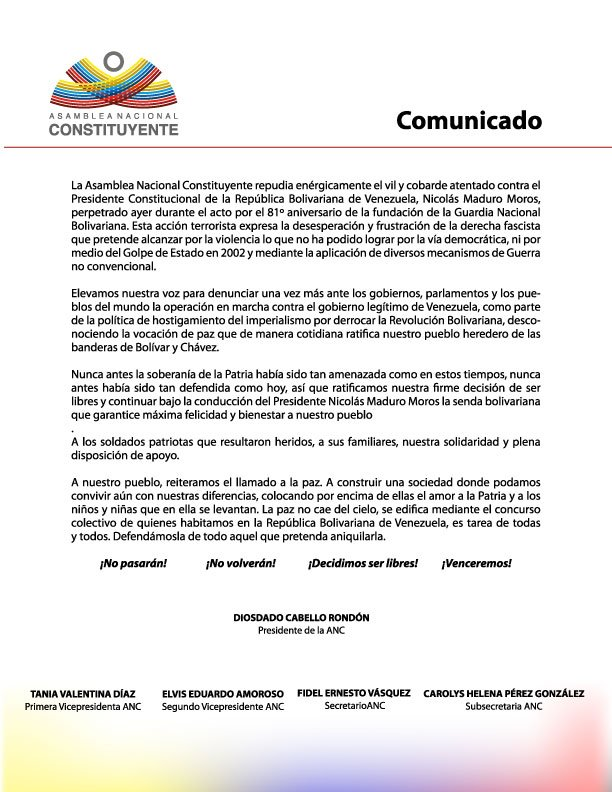
Press release from the Venezuelan Constituent National Assembly

The Venezuelan government referred to the incident as a "terrorist attack". A press release from the Venezuelan Constituent National Assembly, written by Diosdado Cabello, said that they "fiercely condemn the vile and cowardly attack against the constitutional President of the Bolivarian Republic of Venezuela" and that the "act of terrorism shows the hopelessness and frustration of the fascist right", also expressing solidarity with "the patriotic soldiers who were injured". The leading opposition group in Venezuela, Frente Amplio Venezuela Libre ("Venezuelan Liberation Front"), expressed confusion as to the nature of the incident, saying that they can't know if it was "an attack, a fortuitous accident, or any of the other stories being shared on social media".

Two days after the explosions, on Monday 6 August, Maduro supporters rallied in downtown Caracas, waving flags and with painted faces. However, Reuters reporters on the scene said that there were only a few hundred people, most of whom were government workers, and with several telling the journalists that they had been instructed to attend to support Maduro's image.

There was immediate outcry among the opposition in the nation after Cabello incited a move to strip supposed plotters and National Assemblymen Julio Borges and Juan Requesens of their diplomatic immunity. The National Assembly Vice President Julio César Reyes spoke out against the move, saying that the "constitution is clear" and "only the Supreme Court of Justice has the authority to order a deputy's arrest, with congressional approval". On 9 August, the National Assembly – Venezuela's parliament – requested that other nations ignore the arrest warrant on Borges, saying that it was "political in nature and should not be recognised by any foreign court".

Chavista politician Sergio Sánchez reported that people voicing anti-Maduro sentiment in the wake of the attack were being punished, citing a family from Ciudad Tiuna in Caracas who were "evicted [...] for making a political comment about the attack against the President", adding that the government now "relies on the fear of the people to maintain power".

Following the release of a video of opposition leader Juan Requesens giving statements wearing underwear stained with faeces, Venezuelans protested in the streets wearing underwear in a statement of moral support for Requesens. A group brought some of Requesens' t-shirts as an offering for his release among other tributes for political prisoners during a mass service held in San Cristóbal, the capital of his home state Táchira. The Bar Association of Venezuela released a statement condemning the arrest and imprisonment of Requesens, saying it was "arbitrary and illegal", campaigning for the government to release him and naming "numerous and gravely serious objections" to his imprisonment, with the worst being the "obscene, protuberant, impudent and even boastful [...] dissemination of [Requesens'] alleged self-incrimination", saying that they will seek action against the government and aim to prosecute those at fault "once the Rule of Law has been restored to our beloved Venezuela". The opposition deputy Gilber Caro stood in front of the National Assembly on 14 August and stripped to his underwear to send support to Requesens. He said that a man's dignity is not dependent on his state of dress.

On the Monday 13 August, a protest march called "La Patria Llama" ("The Fatherland Calls") was held starting at the edge of Petare, Miranda and travelled through the Greater Caracas area to Parque Carabobo station. It was organised by Cabello for supporters of the Maduro government who want to "bring to justice the extremists", Cabello adding that these people "would have to kill millions of Venezuelans" to change the country.

=== International ===
The attack was condemned by the governments of El Salvador, Nicaragua and Bolivia, as well as the FARC, a former revolutionary group from Colombia. Cuban President Miguel Díaz-Canel further announced that his nation would supply unlimited aid to Venezuela and the Bolivarian Revolution. Turkish President Recep Tayyip Erdogan spoke by phone with Maduro, giving his best wishes to the President and to the soldiers injured in the incident.

Uruguay and Spain both denounced the violence. The Spanish embassy also said that the crisis in Venezuela should be solved peacefully and democratically. Panama's president Juan Carlos Varela stated "that accusing former President Santos is irresponsible of President Maduro" and that "on one hand we condemn violence, but on the other hand we also condemn the fact that they are making baseless accusations against heads of state". Luis Almagro, Secretary General of the Organization of American States, stated that "[t]he null credibility of the Maduro regime prevents knowing the truth of what happened" and reiterated that he "will always condemn the use of violence as a political tool".

A Brazilian court case was ongoing regarding the travel of Venezuelan migrants across the Brazil-Venezuela border, and it was closed on Sunday 5 August, the day after the attack, with Judge Helder Barreto suspending restrictions but closing the border to Venezuelans until stability was achieved on both sides. It was reopened shortly after the official bar, with the Brazilian Supreme Court saying the move was too reactionary and "not justified", commentators connecting the closure with an already strained situation gaining further "raised tensions" after the drone incident.

The European Union promoted a "thorough and transparent investigation" and demanded the Venezuelan government to recognize "the constitutional powers of the National Assembly, including full respect for its prerogatives with respect to the parliamentary immunity of its members in accordance with the rights, legislation and established constitutional procedures". The Venezuelan government condemned the European Union's response, stating that it is "trapped in its irrational rhetoric" and that the European body intends to "ignore the terrorist actions". Vice President of the Subcommittee on Human Rights of the European Parliament, Beatriz Becerra, condemned the arrest of Juan Requesens, stating "Kidnapped, tortured, humiliated. [Juan Requesens] [a]n elected deputy. With all the constitutional guarantees abolished in Venezuela by a dictatorial regime. Please, Federica Mogherini and Antonio Tajani let's fulfill our commitment with a winner of the Sakharov Prize". The Federal Foreign Office of Germany condemned the arrest of Requesens calling it a "clear violation of parliamentary immunity" and demanded a "thorough and transparent investigation".

==== Colombia ====
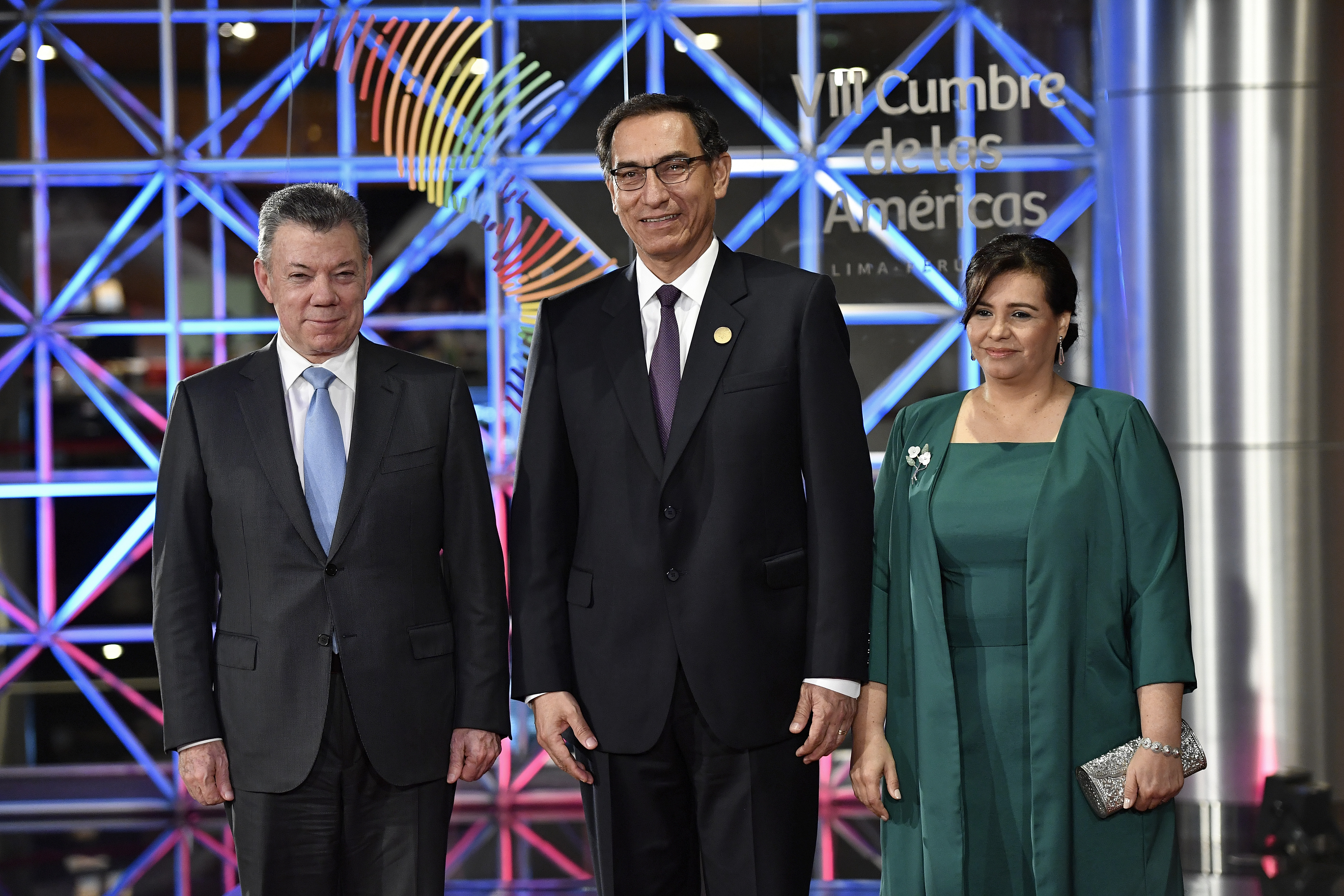
Juan Manuel Santos (left) in April 2018. At the time of the attack, Santos was the President of Colombia.

The earliest and most prominent of blame accusations were those levelled against Colombia, with Maduro specifically naming the Colombian President Santos as orchestrating his assassination, saying he had "no doubt" about it. The Colombian government quickly denied this, stating that Santos was too preoccupied with his granddaughter's baptism to think about overthrowing Maduro. Another statement added that it is "customary for Maduro to blame Colombia for any kind of problem in his country", and on the following Monday Santos himself tweeted to Maduro telling him "not to worry himself", also restating his own attendance at the "more important" baptism on the Saturday.

Two days after the incident, on Monday, 6 August, the Colombian Civil Aviation Authority announced a ban on drones and multirotors at the Presidential procession for Iván Duque's inauguration the next day over fears of a similar incident, with the prohibition extending to a radius and altitude of 2 nautical miles, or 12,000 feet, from Plaza Bolívar, Bogotá. There were no drone attacks on the day, but it saw other attacks by FARC dissidents in which a police officer died and five people were injured.

==== United States ====
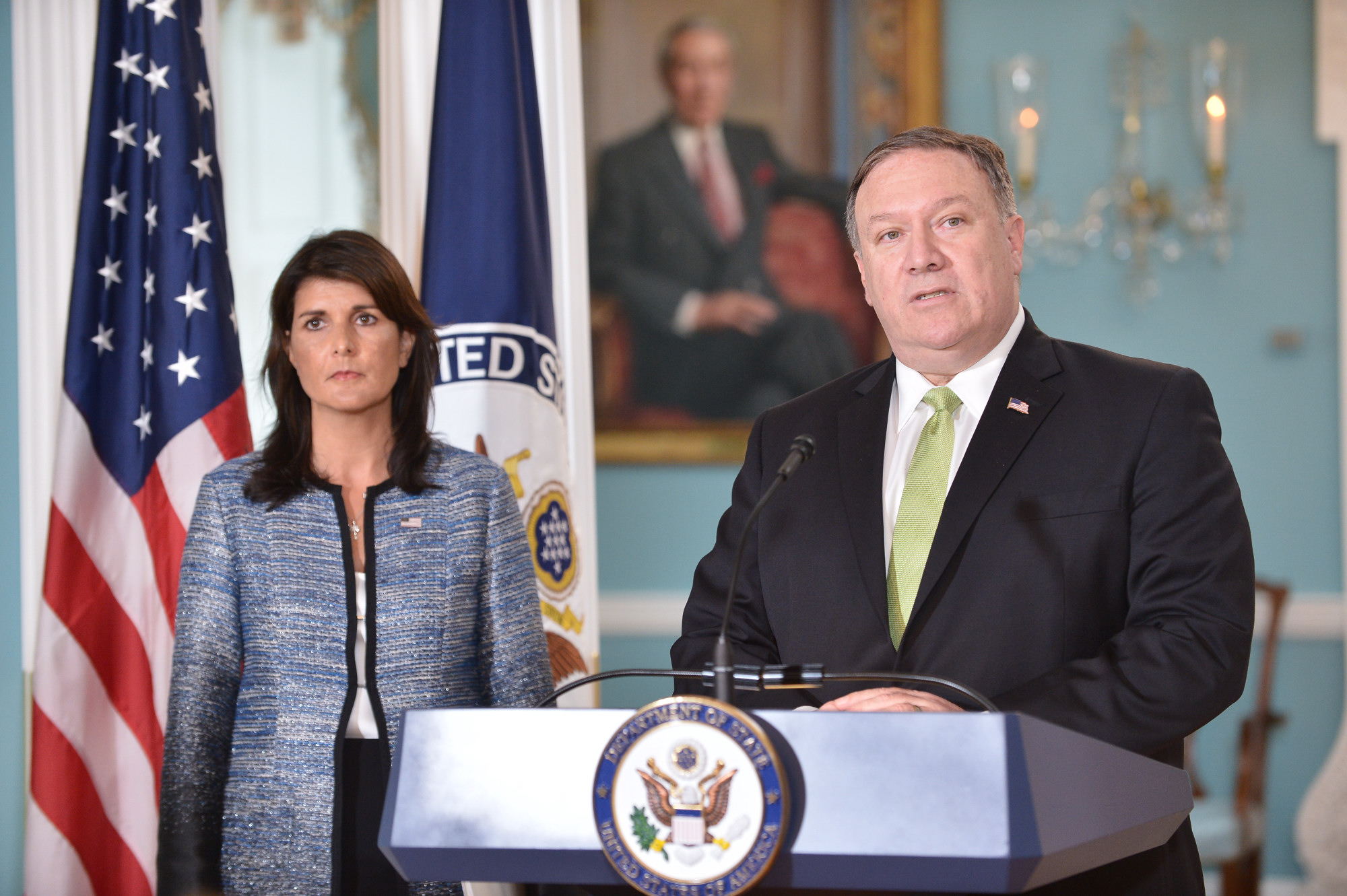
US representatives Mike Pompeo and Nikki Haley (left) in June 2018

In response to Maduro's accusations, the US National Security Advisor, John R. Bolton, denied US involvement in the attack and suggested that the incident could be "a pretext set up by the regime itself". Bolton also stated that if the Venezuelan government "has hard information that they want to present to [the US] that would show a potential violation of U.S. criminal law, [they'll] take a serious look at it." On Monday, 6 August, US Secretary of State Mike Pompeo restated that the United States government had no involvement.

Telemundo reported that the US embassy told its citizens in Venezuela to "find a safe place to stay, maintain a low profile, and avoid protests". James Story, chargé d'affaires at the US embassy in Caracas, met with Saab and Venezuelan Foreign Minister Jorge Arreaza in the week following the incident. Arreaza told Fox News that Story said it was "the will of the U.S. government to cooperate".

In response to the United States stating it would cooperate, Maduro said he would allow the FBI to investigate the incident, saying that if "the United States ratifies its offering for the FBI to cooperate in the investigations on the links in Florida [regarding] the plans of the 4 August assassination attempt and terrorist attack, [he] would accept it".

The United States Ambassador to the UN Nikki Haley was visiting the Colombian-Venezuelan border at Cúcuta on Wednesday, 8 August, to discuss the migrant crisis, and commented that Maduro had caused the attack, that "he did this by creating this chaos" and that "everyone needs to be loud against Maduro and force him to leave". She also pledged US$9 million in aid to Colombia to help support the Venezuelan migrants there.

=== Others ===
The Venezuelan Václav Havel Prize for Creative Dissent-winning satirical news site El Chigüire Bipolar posted an article the day after the detention of Juan Requesens showing a photoshopped image of Maduro holding a pokeball with the headline "Nicol-ash Maduro announces open season on capture of political prisoners", likening him to the character Ash from Pokémon who has the mission to "catch them all". The site attributed the fictional quote "We are going to catch them all, the 150 deputies that are out there, we already have Requesens, now we are going after Borges and Meowth of Team Rocket" to "Nicol-ash".

== Controversy ==
=== Assassination legitimacy ===
The Guardian reported that the allegations made by Maduro were "too neat" and quoted commentators who doubt the assassination legitimacy. International Crisis Group consultant Phil Gunson stated that "[t]he official 'investigation' [is following course]: begin with the conclusions and work backwards", and senior fellow at the Washington Office on Latin America David Smilde added that "[Maduro will] use it to further restrict liberty and purge the government and armed forces".

Peruvian newspaper La República also wrote that "[s]ome analysts suspect that the attack is a desperate farce" and that "[i]t would not be the first time that an unscrupulous government mounted this type of setup," comparing it to the burning of the Reichstag. The paper concluded that, "genuine attack or mounted farce, basically it does not matter: Maduro has taken things to this point, which suggests bloody outcomes".

The German international news service Deutsche Welle said that the only certainty about the attack is that "[t]he only one benefitting from all this is Maduro himself", noting that the President "has claimed at least 20 coups or attacks against him, but not a single one has done him harm". They called the incident "'fake news'" because "[Maduro's] regime emerges from every actual or supposed attack stronger than before", relating this to the crisis in Venezuela by saying that "[e]ach incident further distracts from increasingly unbearable problems in the country".

=== Firefighter narrative ===
According to initial reports after the explosion, the Associated Press stated that firefighters attended the scene and claimed that a gas tank located in the Don Eduardo apartment block had exploded during the rally, the explosion caught part of the building on fire and had to be put out. An independent investigation by NGO Control Ciudadano did conclude, in regards to drone explosions, that "[t]he nearby building explosion was coincidental."

Efecto Cocuyo visited the building and reported that all apartments received piped gas, which does not require gas tanks. They could not say if there was also a gas tank. Video later provided by Telemundo appeared to show a drone crash into the side of the apartment building. Days after the event, Bellingcat's investigation stated that the report by firefighters was an "early narrative" and that a "second drone crashed and exploded [...] and is the most likely cause of the fire which the Venezuelan firefighters described".

=== Use of drones ===
Media outlets in Spain and Ecuador quoted a soldier in the rally who claimed he saw no drones, but heard something "like a grenade". El País says Maduro's version of events is not credible. Former Venezuelan military aide Anthony Daquin talked to NTN24 about the incident and criticised the assassination theory, explaining that the event was a no-fly zone and any drones in the area would have been operated by the government.

Another theory was that an accidental drone failure caused the incident. The Guardian reported that an independent investigation had been opened by the NGO Control Ciudadano and its head Rocío San Miguel, a military expert, which claimed that "at least one drone belonged to the military, who lost control of the device inflight. Soldiers then shot it down." She repeated this statement later in a broadcast of Con La Luz with Efecto Cocuyo on 9 August, saying that "it was a mistake by the military and Presidential Honor Guard, and I believe that they destroyed the drones".

According to former Venezuelan Vice Admiral Mario Carratu, claims that the drones were shot down by gunfire is inaccurate because "[p]lastic explosives can't be detonated with bullets. They more likely exploded prematurely due to poor preparations by the hit team".

The Venezuelan ambassador to Barbados spoke on 7 August, saying that drones are actually completely banned in Venezuela. In one of Maduro's television presentations, he said that the drone that exploded at the stage was loaded with gunpowder and lead, not C4, but the one that hit the building had gunpowder and C4.

== See also ==
- Colombia–Venezuela relations
- 2018 Bulawayo bombing, an assassination attempt of a similar nature that occurred in Zimbabwe a month earlier.
- Operation Gideon (2020)
