= Paparoni =

Paparoni is a surname of Italian origin. Notable people with the surname include:

- Alessandro Paparoni (born 1981), Italian volleyball player
- Carlos Paparoni (born 1986), Venezuelan politician
- Giovanni Paparoni (died c. 1153/1154), Italian Cardinal and papal legate
