= Avenida Bolívar, Caracas =

Road in Caracas, Venezuela

Avenida Bolívar
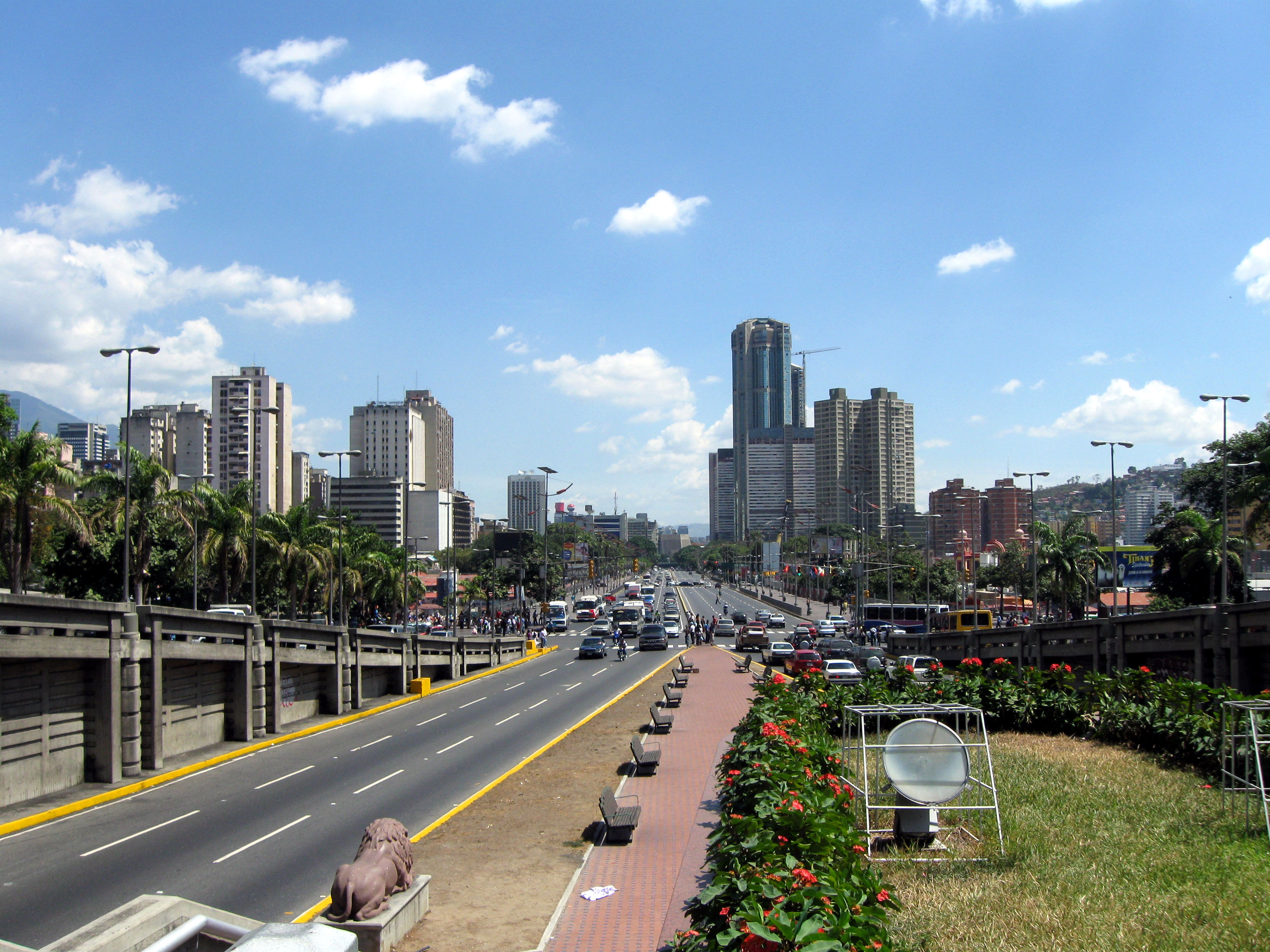
- Interactive map of Avenida Bolívar
- Length: 2 km (1.2 mi)
- Location: Caracas

Construction
- Construction start: 25 July 1945
- Inauguration: 31 December 1949

Avenida Bolívar, in English Bolívar Avenue, is an important avenue located in the Libertador Bolivarian Municipality in the west of Caracas, the capital of Venezuela.

== History ==
Pathé News report on Avenida Bolívar in 1952.

The avenue's construction began on 25 July 1945, and it was opened on 31 December 1949 as part of the large project "Plan Rotival", which also included monuments like a new Capital building and a mausoleum for Simón Bolívar in the cemetery.

Due to its significant dimensions, at 2 km in length, the avenue is used for a wide range of events both political - e.g. marches, protests, demonstrations, rallies, and campaign events - as well as cultural and sporting.

Avenida Bolívar is connected to Avenida Libertador and Avenida Lecuna, crosses José María Vargas Park, and is linked with the old passenger terminal of Nuevo Circo. In the Avenida Bolívar public area are the Children's Museum of Caracas, the Teresa Carreño Cultural Complex, the Hotel Venetur Alba Caracas, the National Art Gallery, the Parque Central Complex, the Sector El Conde, the Bellas Artes locale, the La Hoyada Market, the Centro Simón Bolívar Towers and the Palacio de Justicia de Caracas and its square, along with many other important buildings.

Traffic lights were installed on the avenue in 1986, to facilitate the opening of pedestrian ways. Before this it was strictly an expressway.

In August 2018, it was the location of the 81st anniversary of the GNB, when the Caracas drone explosions took place.
