= José Manuel Olivares =

Venezuelan politician and physician (born 1985)

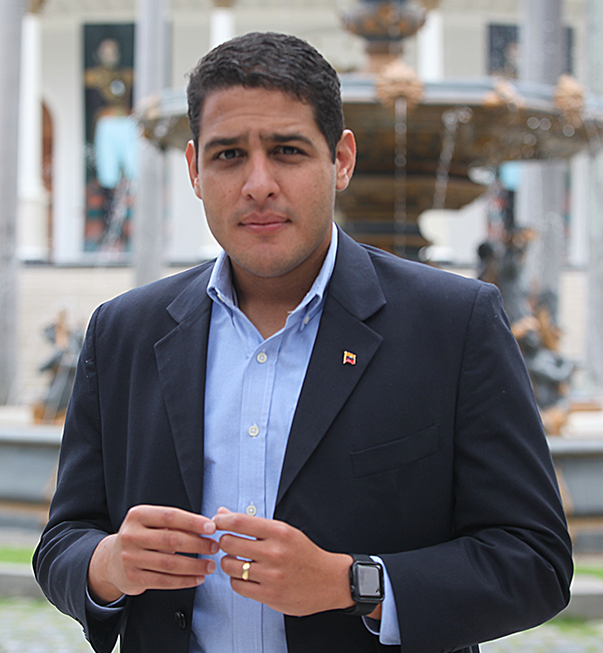
- Olivares in 2016

Deputy of the National Assembly for Vargas State
- In office 5 January 2016 – 5 January 2021

Personal details
- Born: 19 August 1985 (age 40) Maiquetía, Vargas, Venezuela
- Party: Un Nuevo Tiempo (previously); Justice First
- Education: Central University of Venezuela (MD); Pompeu Fabra University (MPH); University of South Florida (MPP)

José Manuel Olivares Marquina (born 19 August 1985) is a Venezuelan politician, oncologist and nuclear medicine physician who served as a deputy of the National Assembly from Vargas from 2016 to 2021. During his tenure, he was the president of the National Assembly's Health Subcommission, where he spearheaded the National Health Crisis Provision Law and directed humanitarian aid to counteract the effects of the medicine shortage in Venezuela. He was also the president of the Permanent Commission on Integral Family Development. Olivares has been a major figure in the Venezuelan opposition against the government of Nicolás Maduro. In June 2018, Olivares and his family fled to Colombia, where he has helped direct the shipment of humanitarian aid to Venezuela.

== Early life ==
José Manuel Olivares was born in the San José de Maiquetía Hospital in Maiquetía, Vargas on 19 August 1985. He is the son of Maiquetía native José Manuel Olivares Corredor and Lucía Marquina, a native of 23 de Enero in Caracas.

Olivares had a tranquil childhood until 1999, when the flooding and landslides of the Vargas tragedy wiped out most of the state's infrastructure. The Olivares family home in the Los Corales housing development was destroyed in the disaster.

Olivares attended the Franciscan school Colegio Divina Providencia and the Colegio San Vicente de Paúl. Olivares initially studied biochemistry at the Central University of Venezuela, but transitioned to studying medicine in 2004. After graduating in 2010, Olivares spent his mandatory year of military service working in a clinic in Tacarigua de Mamporal, Miranda. In 2013, he began his postgraduate studies at the Hospital Clínico Universitario in Caracas, specializing in oncology, radiation therapy and nuclear medicine.

== Student movement of 2007 ==
As president of the Student Center at the Central University of Venezuela's medical school, Olivares helped create the biggest student movement since the Generation of 1928. The students demonstrated against excessive red tape, advocating for Internet access, fair schedules for students, updates to the school's technology and increased access to books. Olivares took to the streets in peaceful protest together with other leaders like Yon Goicoechea, Stalin González, Miguel Pizarro, Ricardo Sánchez Mujica, Freddy Guevara and David Smolansky. The students demanded freedom of expression and rejected constitutional reforms by president Hugo Chávez.

== Political career ==
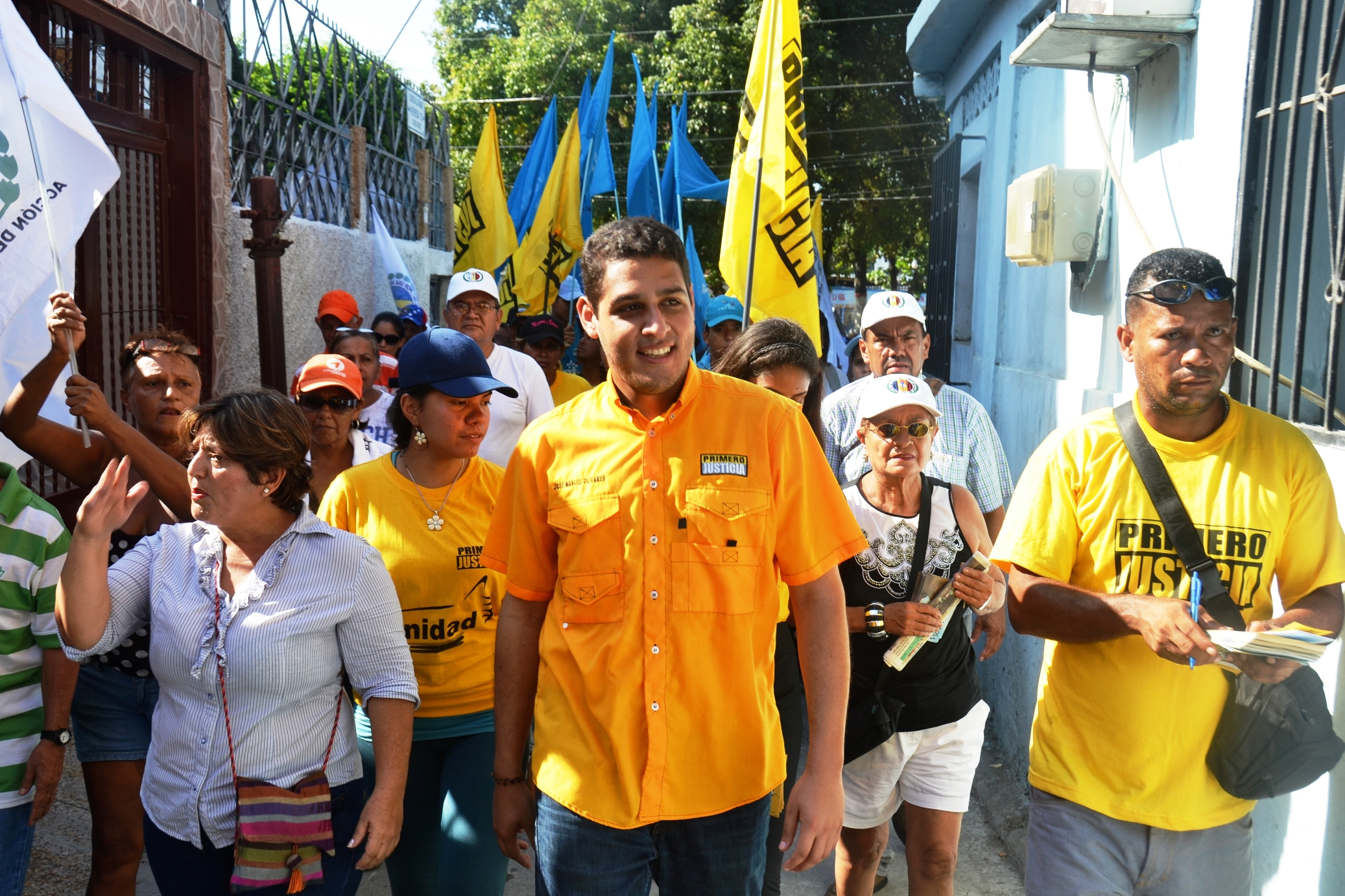
Olivares campaigning for the 2015 parliamentary elections

Olivares was a candidate of Un Nuevo Tiempo for Vargas state governorship in 2012, supported by other MUD parties; he lost to the incumbent governor Jorge García Carneiro by a large margin.

Olivares won the deputy seat in the 2015 parliamentary elections on 6 December 2016. He assumed office on 5 January 2016.

After taking office, Olivares was immediately elected to lead the Health Subcommission. Olivares used his position to highlight the poor conditions of Venezuelan hospitals, including shortages of medicine and medical and surgical supplies. He helped implement the approval of the National Assembly's Health and Humanitarian Crisis Declaration Agreement. Olivares traveled to Washington D.C. to formally petition the World Health Organization to provide medicines in the form of humanitarian aid and to give Venezuela access to the WHO's Strategic Fund.

In 2016, the National Assembly passed the Special Law to Address the National Health Crisis, which established parameters for defining when shortages would become critical and which organizations would be able to request humanitarian aid. The law was declared unconstitutional by the Supreme Tribunal of Justice. The same year, there was an increase in cases of malaria in Venezuela and diseases like diphtheria reappeared. This health crisis spawned debates over the scope of legislative powers in situations like Venezuela's public health crisis. As a consequence, the Assembly approved various healthcare accords to address the health crisis. Olivares was the main voice advocating for these accords in the Assembly.

In addition to legislative action, José Manuel Olivares has been a main organizer of events like the Marcha de los Récipes, where patients marched to the Apostolic Nunciature to Venezuela, demanding access to humanitarian aid.

In 2017, Olivares became a candidate in Vargas regional elections again, being a Justice First candidate supported by other MUD parties without primaries, by consensus. He lost election to governor García Carneiro for the second time in a row but by a much lesser margin this time compared to 2012.

On May 10, 2017, after more than 30 days of demonstrations in Venezuela, the Venezuelan National Guard shot and killed Miguel Castillo, a 27-year-old demonstrator. Olivares denounced the shooting on Twitter, calling it an assassination. In 2017, Olivares' brother was detained and jailed for several months. In July 2018, a SEBIN agent informed Olivares that the intelligence agency would arrest his family if he did not cease his political activities.

On 19 July 2018, Olivares and his family fled Venezuela for Colombia. After Juan Guaidó was declared Venezuela's acting president, Olivares began assisting Guaidó in his efforts to bring humanitarian aid to Venezuela.
