= Tacarigua de Mamporal =

- Coordinates: 10°24′N 66°09′W

Tacarigua de Mamporal is a town in Miranda State, Venezuela.
