= Miguel Pizarro =

Venezuelan congressman

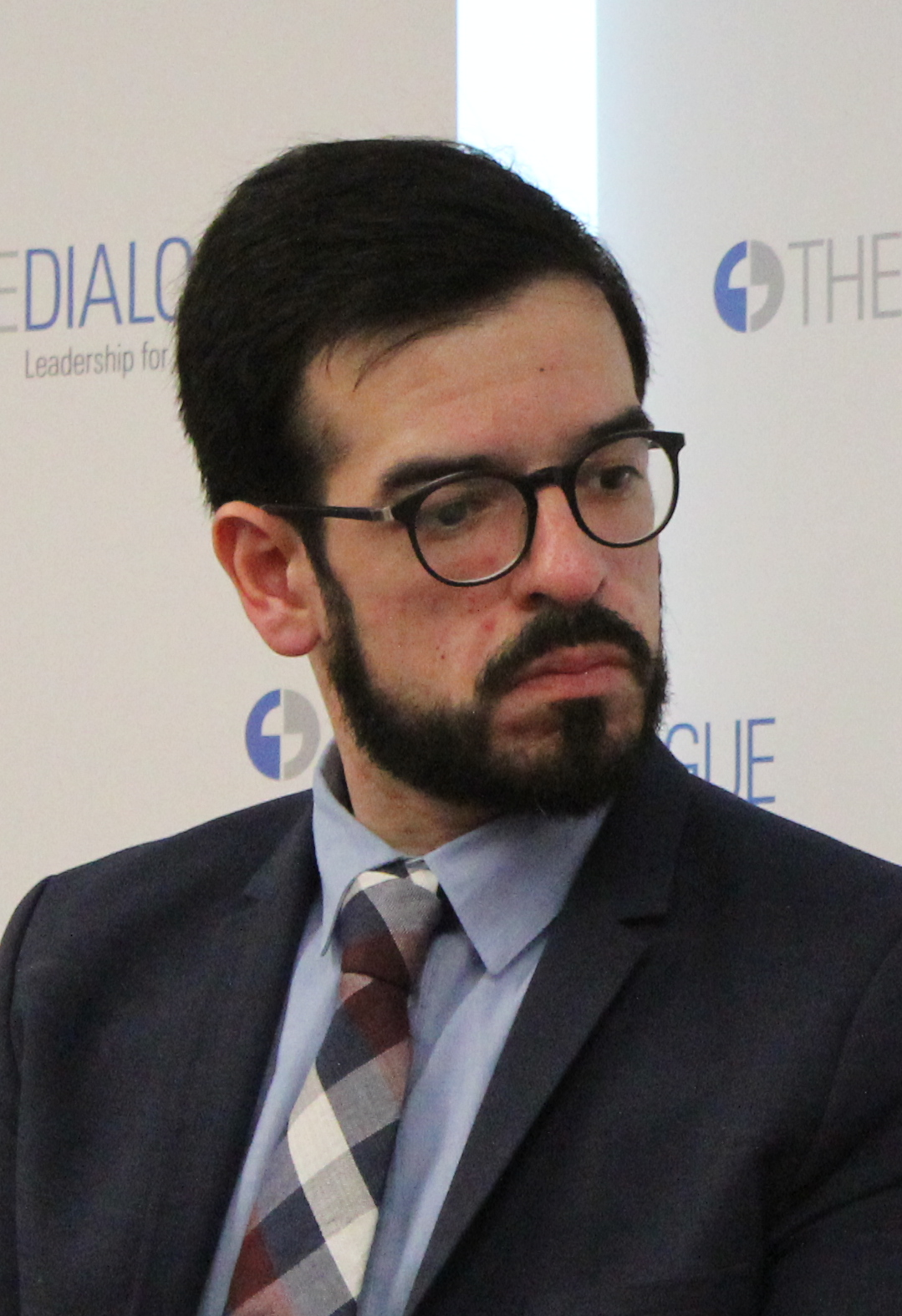
- Pizarro in 2020

Deputy of the National Assembly for Miranda
- Incumbent
- Assumed office 5 January 2011

President of the Commission for Social Development and Integration
- In office 13 January 2016 – 18 January 2017
- Preceded by: Oswaldo Vera
- Succeeded by: Juan Requesens

Personal details
- Born: Miguel Alejandro Pizarro Rodríguez; February 17, 1988 (age 38) Petare, Miranda, Venezuela
- Party: Justice First; Progressive Advance (formerly)
- Education: Universidad Central de Venezuela
- Website: www.miguel-pizarro.com

Miguel Alejandro Pizarro Rodríguez (born February 17, 1988) is a Venezuelan politician in the National Assembly who represents Petare in Caracas.

== Early life ==
Around the time of his birth, Pizarro's family moved to the state of Táchira, where he lived until he was four years old. They then moved back to the same area as before — barrio 24 de Julio — where Miguel spent much of his young life. He was part of a punk band called Kolumpio when he was a student.

== Political formation ==
From the age of 13 Pizarro participated in political activism, coming from a family with a political activist tradition. His father was of the political left militia from the 1970s, and was a trade union activist and at one point imprisoned in Cuartel San Carlos. His mother was one of the founders of the Committee in Defense of Human Rights for political prisoners, and was secretary to the fraction of left parties of the Senate.

During his youth, Pizarro subscribed to anarchism, particularly to the ideas of Mikhail Bakunin and Peter Kropotkin akin to anarco-punk. In high school, he founded the antimilitarist movement "Ni casco ni uniforme" (English: "Without helmet or uniform"), which opposed the government's implementation of military education in secondary education establishments. Due to his protests, he was expelled from the Franciscan school he was studying at.

== 2007 student movement ==
In 2007, Pizarro started and participated in the protests of the Movimiento Estudiantil (English: "The Student Movement"), with other future politicians like Freddy Guevara, Juan Requesens, Juan Guaidó, Yon Goicoechea, Eduardo Massieu and Manuela Bolívar when he was a student leader at the Central University of Venezuela, protesting the closure of the television channel RCTV. He also played an active part in the campaign against the intended Chávez-implemented 2007 Venezuelan constitutional referendum.

== National Assembly ==
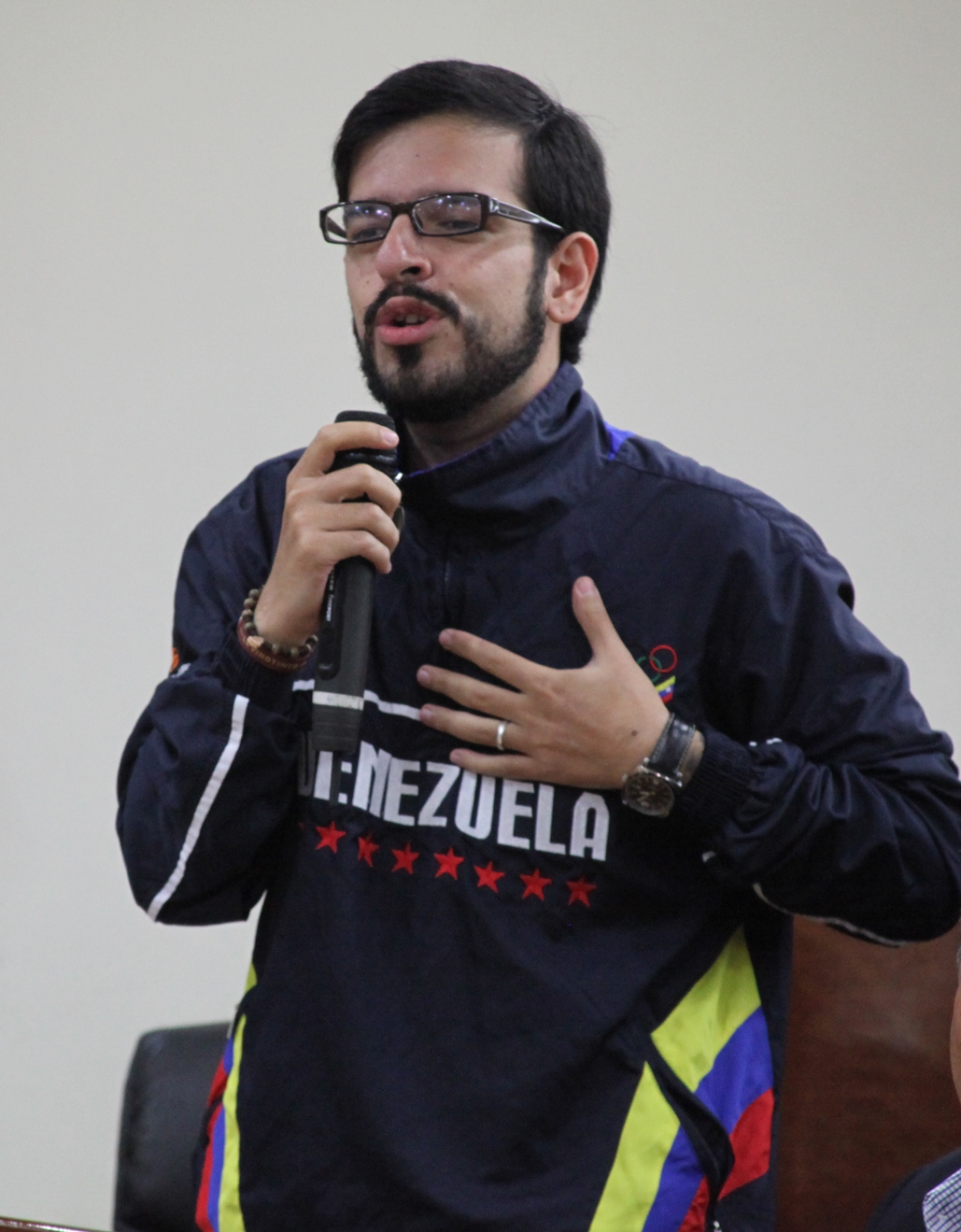
Pizarro in the National Assembly in 2013

Pizarro was elected as a deputy in the 2010 Venezuelan parliamentary election at age 21, supported by the Democratic Unity Roundtable (MUD), when he was a member of the Progressive Advance party. He represented the second district of Táchira as the alternate representative for deputy Gabino Paz.

In 2015, he worked on the enactment of the Special Law against Violence in Sports Events, approved in its first discussion. This sought to eradicate the acts of violence in the massive sporting events of the country, especially after the shooting murder of a fan during a football match between the teams Deportivo Lara and Portuguesa F.C. in November 2014.

Pizarro has strongly criticized the inefficiency of the National Assembly in resolving the problems it acknowledges as affecting the Venezuelan population. In numerous interviews he has highlighted the need to focus on solving the problems that affect the people, instead of wasting time in political rhetoric discussion with little results:

"Our National Assembly can not keep its back turned to what is happening on the streets. [...] Here you can stand, as you surely will again, and say that we are victims of an economic war. What we are victims of is an inefficient government that does not produce results and does not allow them to produce results.

— Miguel Pizarro, intervention in the National Assembly, 11 August 2015.

Pizarro is a member of the Commission for Social Development, where he has promoted legislation such as the Organic Law on Sports — the first law passed by consensus in its legislative period, having the approval of the Venezuelan Olympic Committee, unions, athletes, and professional leagues — and the Law for the Promotion and Protection of the Right to Equality, for people with HIV/AIDS and their relatives.

=== Reelection as deputy ===
On 24 June 2015, the MUD announced its candidates for the 2015 Venezuelan parliamentary election. On 6 December that year, Pizarro was reelected with 64.9% of the vote in the third district of Miranda state, the parish of Petare. Some of the members of his campaign had been attacked by colectivos on 22 November.

=== Presidency of the Commission for Social Development ===
During the legislative year 2016, Pizarro was the president of the National Assembly's Commission for Social Development. Among the laws he promoted there were the Law of Bond for Food and Medicines for Pensioners and the Retired the Law of Guarantee of School Meals, and the Law of Recognition and Protection for People with Autism Spectrum Disorders and Similar Conditions.

== Human rights activism ==
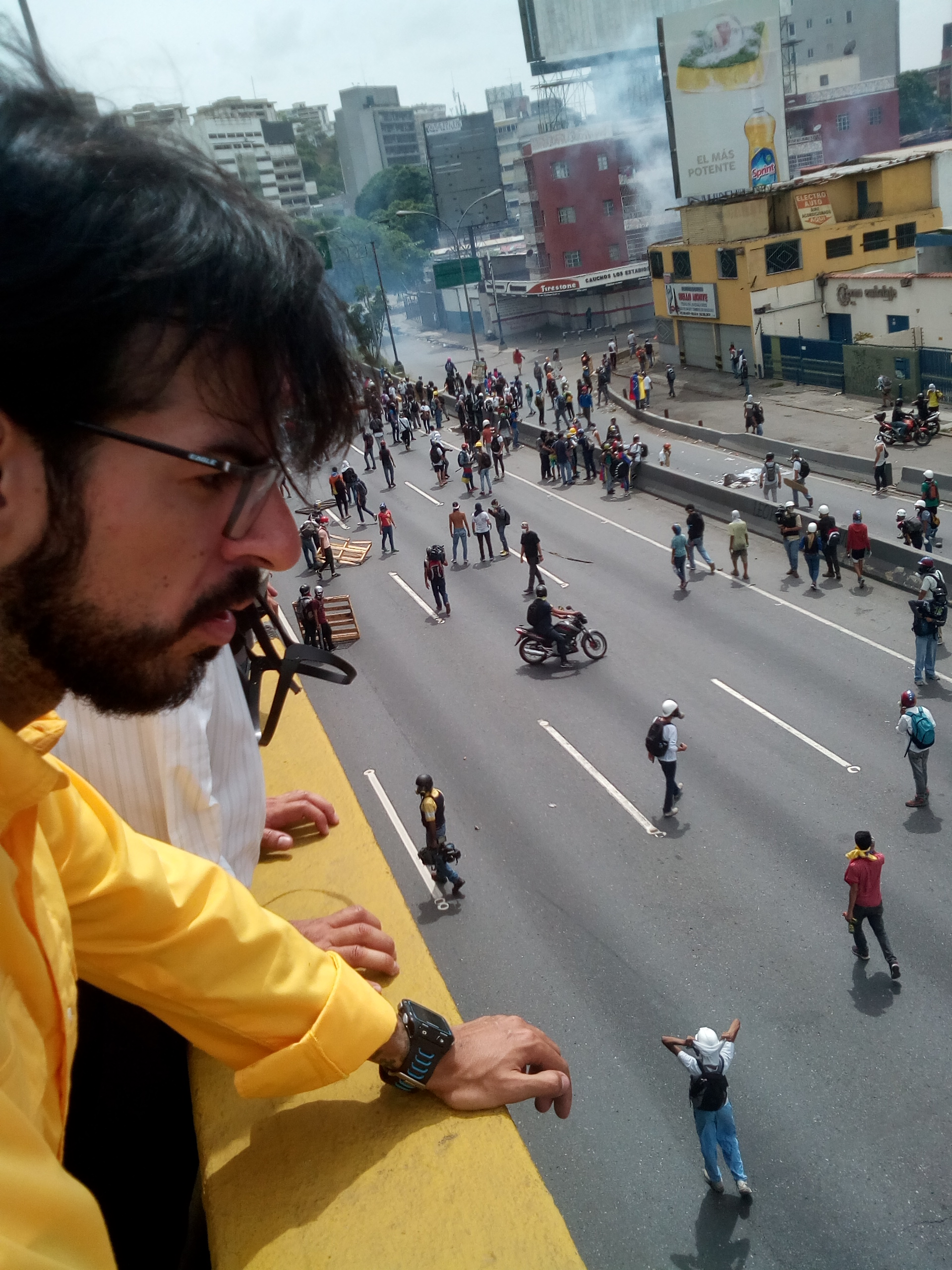
Pizarro during the 2017 Venezuelan protests

Pizarro has worked for the cause of human rights for many years, and especially in the case of those detained in the protests in Venezuela that started in 2014, working with their families to seek a just trial for them. Although not supporting violent protests, he gave his voice to the cause of removing the government of Nicolás Maduro, saying he respected those who criticized Maduro.

Pizarro spoke openly to demand respect in the parliamentary debates related to the murder in 2014 of Robert Serra, a young lawyer and National Assembly deputy, by the PSUV — the party to which Pizarro is opposed. Likewise, he demanded to bring to justice the authors of the crime, also demanding repudiation of all violence and its supporters.

In November 2016, after Venezuela received Universal Periodic Review documentation denouncing its ignorance towards Human Rights, Pizarro was the deputy who took on the leadership role to disseminate responsibilities to appropriate commissions.
