= Carlos Paparoni =

Venezuelan politician

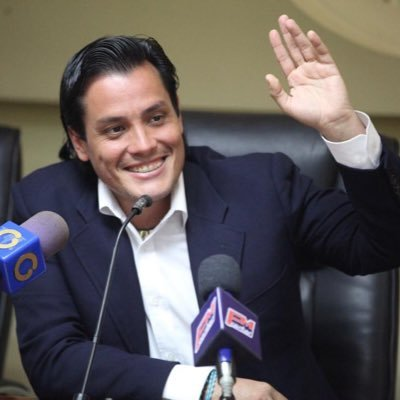
Carlos Paparoni

Carlos Alberto Paparoni Ramírez (10 September 1988) is a Venezuelan politician

== Career ==
He is a deputy of the National Assembly for the fourth circuit of the Mérida state. During the 2019 Venezuelan presidential crisis, he has been working as an aide and commissioner of finance to interim president Juan Guaidó.

While protesting outside Venezuela's Supreme Court with other opposition politicians in March 2017, he was attacked by armed groups and the Venezuelan National Guard.

== Personal life ==
He is the son of Alexis Paparoni, also a politician.
