= 2026 political prisoner release in Venezuela =

Multiple prisoner release in Venezuela

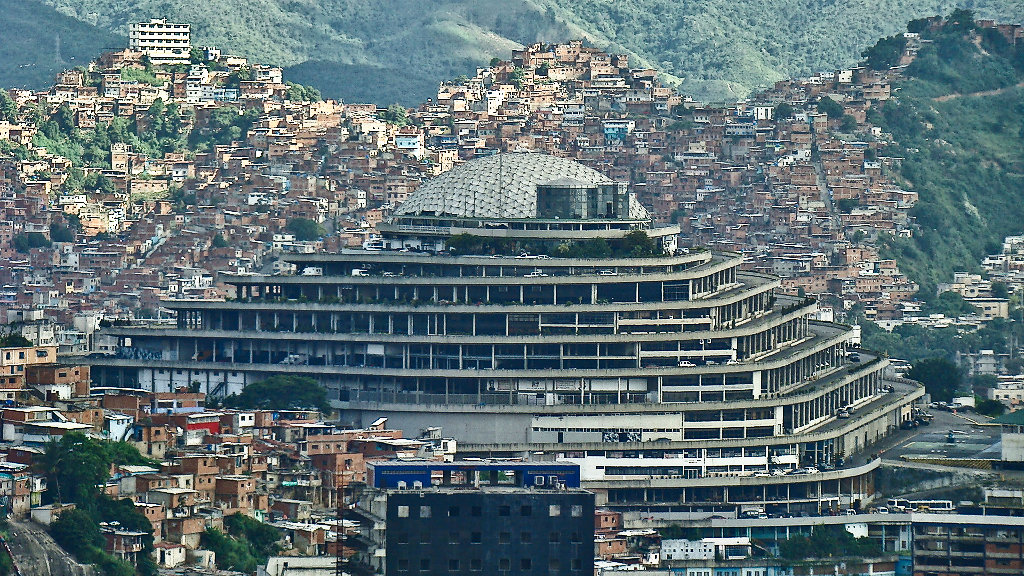
El Helicoide, facility used as detention center and headquarters of the Bolivarian National Intelligence Service. According to NGOs, it has become synonymous of human-rights violations and for the detention of political prisoners. In January 2026, Delcy Rodríguez announced it will be transformed into a cultural center.

In the aftermath of the 2026 United States strikes in Venezuela and capture of Venezuelan president Nicolás Maduro and his wife Cilia Flores, the remaining government in Venezuela, led by his vice president Delcy Rodríguez as acting president, announced the release of multiple Venezuelan and foreign political prisoners in Venezuela starting on 8 January. As of 8 March, 621 political prisoners have been confirmed to be released since its announcement, with over 500 remaining according to the NGO Foro Penal. The Rodríguez administration has published numbers but it has not given specific dates and sometimes counts releases of prior years. Estimates suggested there were over 800 political prisoners in Venezuela prior to 2026, according to human rights organizations. International bodies, including a United Nations Human Rights Council-mandated Independent International Fact-Finding Mission on Venezuela, stated that the measures fell short of Venezuela's human rights obligations and called for the immediate and unconditional release of all political prisoners. Those released are not completely free as they are not allowed to speak publicly and are required to appear before a judge every 30 days. Human rights organizations have qualified the releases as a revolving door effect as some prisoners are released, while others are still being arrested for political reasons. In March, the UN-mandated Fact-Finding Mission indicated that 87 politically motivated arrests were made since January 3.

The United States had previously requested the release of political prisoners, and President Donald Trump declared in an interview "they've been great ... Everything we've wanted, they've given us." Trump announced on 9 January that he had cancelled a second wave of attacks due to cooperation and the release of political prisoners. Venezuelan opposition leader María Corina Machado has called for the immediate release of all political prisoners.

On 29 January, Delcy Rodríguez announced a general amnesty bill covering cases dating back to 1999, which was approved on 19 February by the National Assembly of Venezuela. According to the president of the National Assembly of Venezuela, Jorge Rodríguez, Immediately after the implementation of the bill, 1557 prisoners requested their release. As of 24 February, 91 prisoners have been confirmed released under the amnesty law, according to Foro Penal. Delcy Rodríguez also announced the dismantling of the detention center known as El Helicoide, associated with allegations of torture, along with plans for its conversion into a sport and cultural center.

Various foreign citizens from Argentina, Colombia, Italy, Honduras, Israel, Spain, Portugal, Peru, and the United States previously detained in Venezuela have been released.

Protests, hunger strikes and vigils outside prisons have been held to request the release of their political prisoners.

== Developments ==
=== Announcement and first releases ===
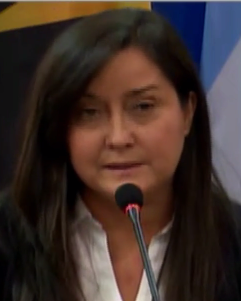
Spanish–Venezuelan activist Rocío San Miguel, detained in 2024, was amongst the first prisoners released on 8 January 2026

Jorge Rodríguez, the brother of Delcy Rodríguez and president of the National Assembly of Venezuela, announced on 8 January 2026 that an "important" number of political prisoners would be released as a "gesture" by the government. Of an estimated 800 political prisoners in Venezuela, nine prisoners were released that day. Those released included five Spanish citizens, notably Spanish–Venezuelan activist Rocío San Miguel, who was detained since February 2024, and two Venezuelan opposition members: Enrique Márquez and Italian–Venezuelan Biagio Pilieri, who were detained after backing Edmundo Gónzalez's victory in the 2024 Venezuelan presidential election.

The Venezuelan Penitentiary Services Ministry announced that they had released 116 prisoners on 12 January. According to human rights organization Foro Penal, only 41 prisoners were confirmed released, including three additional Italian citizens detained since 2024. The United Nations Human Rights Council–mandated Independent International Fact-Finding Mission on Venezuela reported that about 50 out of the estimated 800 political prisoners in Venezuela were released as of 12 January, saying it fell short on the Venezuelan government's international human rights obligations, and called for the "immediate and unconditional" release of all political prisoners.

Multiple US citizens who were detained in Venezuela were released according to US State Department on 13 January. In the afternoon, Foro Penal confirmed at least 56 political prisoners released, Jorge Rodríguez reported a higher number of 400 without a specific timeline. El Nacional reported that some of the names of the prisoners out of the 400 released according to Rodríguez were from December 2025 and from 1 January 2026, before the strikes.

A speech on 14 January by acting president Delcy Rodríguez focused mainly on political prisoners detained under the Maduro administration. She vowed to continue releasing prisoners, saying that the action had "not yet concluded". She still credited Maduro for starting the release of prisoners indicating that she had not broken continuity. Rodríguez announced that 406 prisoners were already released. Foro Penal could only confirm 68 prisoners released at the time. On 17 January, Foro Penal had only confirmed 139 political prisoners released since 8 January.

On 23 January, Foro Penal confirmed 154 political prisoners released since 8 January. The same day, Delcy Rodríguez announced 626 prisoners released without providing a specific date. She called for the Office of the United Nations High Commissioner for Human Rights, led by Volker Türk, to verify the lists. A UNHCR spokesperson said that they were sending a team, and "offered our support to help Venezuela work on a roadmap for dialogue and reconciliation."

On 26 January, Foro Penal confirmed 250 prisoners released since 8 January. On the same day, Interior Minister Diosdado Cabello said that 808 prisoners were released since December 2025. Donald Trump wrote in Truth Social, "I am pleased to report that Venezuela is releasing its Political Prisoners at a rapid rate, which rate will be increasing over the coming short period of time. I’d like to thank the leadership of Venezuela for agreeing to this powerful humanitarian gesture!"

=== Amnesty bill and release of key opposition members ===
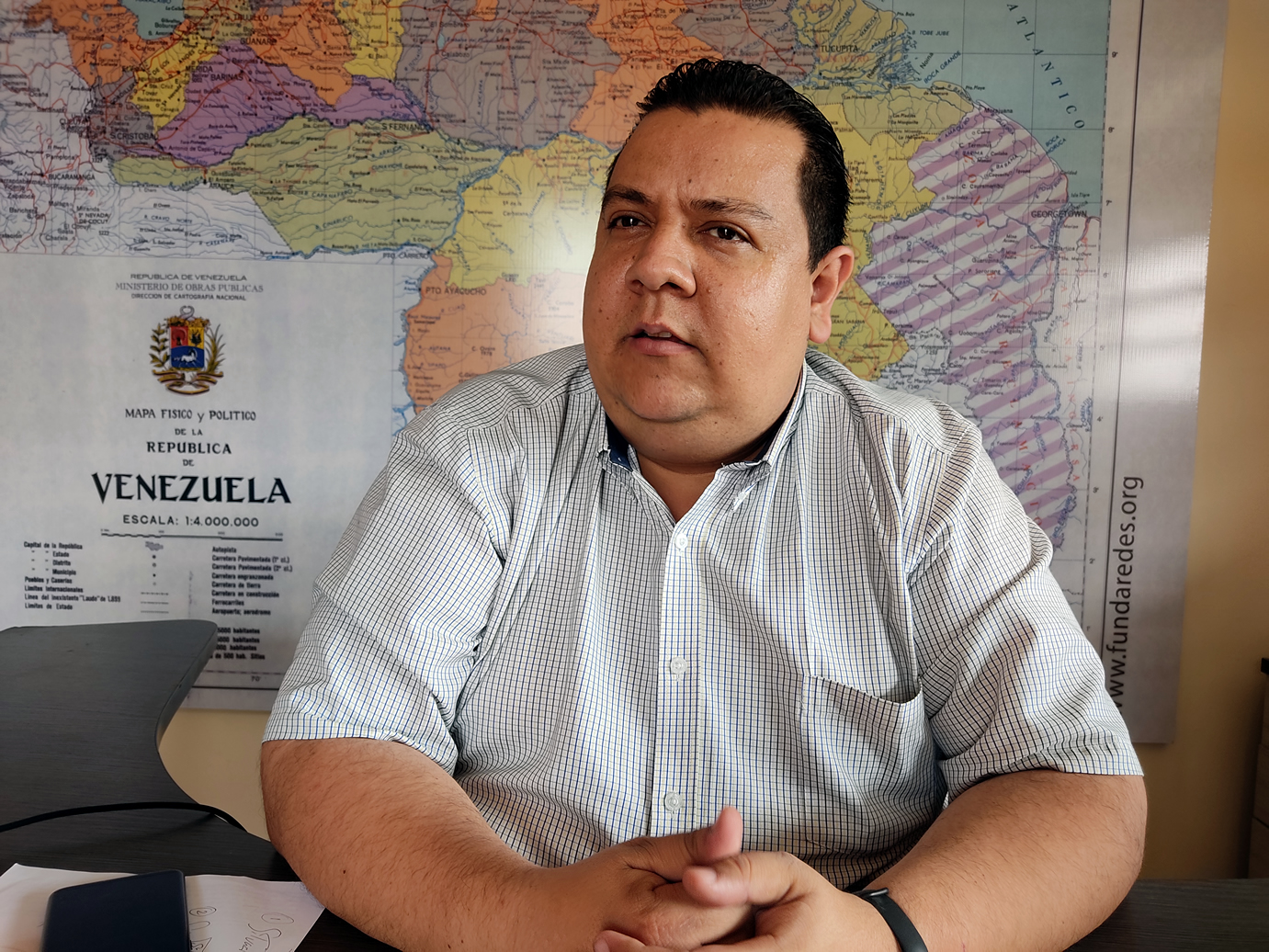
Javier Tarazona, president of NGO Fundaredes. He was arrested in 2021, and released in February 2026.

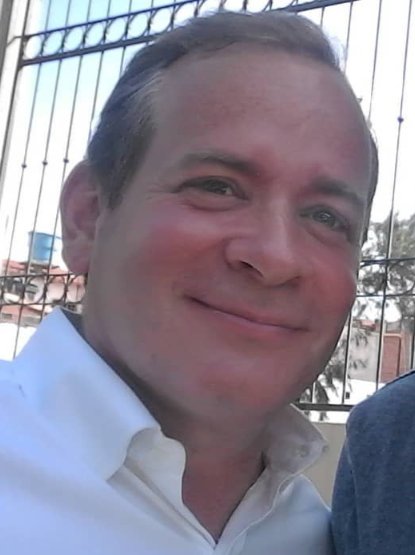
Juan Pablo Guanipa, Venezuelan lawyer and politician, important ally of Maria Corina Machado. He was arrested in 2025, released on 8 February 2026, and was quickly detained afterwards and put under house arrest. He was released on 19 February after the passing of the amnesty bill.

On 30 January, Delcy Rodríguez announced a general amnesty bill covering the "entire period of political violence from 1999 to the present", dating back to when Hugo Chávez first assumed his presidency. People convicted of murder, drug trafficking, corruption or human rights violations will not qualify under the amnesty law. The measure was long requested by the US-backed Venezuelan opposition. Opposition leader María Corina Machado said that the bill was not taken "voluntarily, but rather in response to pressure from the US government". Rodríguez also announced the shutdown of El Helicoide prison, which she said would be transformed into a cultural and sport center. Independent organizations have documented many cases of torture and human rights violation in El Helicoide. Some families of the prisoners gathered outside El Helicoide chanting "Freedom!". At the same time, Foro Penal confirmed 302 releases since 8 January. United States announced also that all American known political prisoners had been released.

On 1 February, Javier Tarazona, director of Fundaredes that monitors military group actions, was released from El Helicoide. He was detained in 2021. On 4 February, more than a dozen prisoners were released. Foro Penal indicated that the number of detained was updated to 700, from over 800 on 8 January, as many political prisoners were previously unreported.

The amnesty law was passed by the National Assembly of Venezuela unanimously on 5 February, in the first of two necessary votes to approve it. The bill draft adds to return assets of those detained and cancel Interpol warrants. The draft also specifies amnesty for those that participated in the 2002 Venezuelan coup attempt, and in 2002–2003, 2004, 2007, 2009, 2013, 2014, 2015, 2017, 2019, 2023, 2024 and 2025 protests. The president of the assembly, Jorge Rodríguez said that all concerned prisoners will be released by Friday 13 February. Jorge Rodríguez also visited the outside of prison centers to reaffirm family members of the upcoming releases. Later, family members of the prisoners reported frustration that the promise did not hold. The debate on 12 February for the bill approval was postponed for the following week.

Juan Pablo Guanipa, former mayor and one of the closest allies to María Corina Machado, arrested in 2025, was released on 8 February. Other close allies of Machado released that day included lawyer Perkins Rocha and politician Freddy Superlano were released to house arrest. Hours later, Guanipa was taken by unknown armed men, Guanipa's son called it a kidnapping. Venezuelan public ministry said that Guanipa had broken the terms of his release. Venezuelan authorities filed an order of house arrest but did not indicate if he was detained again. Interior minister Diosdado Cabello said "They were released, they reunited with their families, until the enlightened stupidity of some politicians led them to believe they could do whatever they wanted and stir up trouble in the country," after his capture. Opposition leader Edmundo González requested proof of life of Guanipa, indicating that missing information about his whereabouts "constitutes a forced disappearance." Political party Justice First wrote on social media "We hold Delcy Rodríguez, Jorge Rodríguez, and Diosdado Cabello responsible for any harm to Juan Pablo's life." On 10 February, Guanipa's son confirmed that Guanipa was in Maracaibo under house arrest.

On 19 February, the amnesty bill was approved by a second vote in the National Assembly. The law does not detail exact crimes as a previous draft. It also does not return assets of those detained, revoke public office bans given for political reasons or cancel sanctions against media outlets, as in a previous draft. Amnesty has to be requested by a lawyer on behalf of the detained and tribunals have 15 days to enable the law. It also absolves search warrant for people outside Venezuela. Four article amendments proposed by opposition parties were rejected. Juan Pablo Guanipa was released from house arrest hours later. According to Jorge Rodríguez, about 1557 people immediately requested a release under the amnesty bill. The Venezuelan Red Cross accepted the government invitation to accompany the release of prisoners. Three days after the amnesty bill passed, Foro Penal was able to confirm only 16 people released according to the amnesty bill. On 23 February, ruling-party deputy Jorge Arreaza said that 177 releases have taken place under the amnesty law and "2,021 people who were under presentation restrictions have been given full liberations." About 91 prisoners were confirmed released under the amnesty law by 24 February by Foro Penal.

During the 2026 State of the Union Address in the United States, president Donald Trump celebrated the capture of Nicolás Maduro and invited Venezuelan politician and former prisoner Enrique Márquez, released in January. Márquez reunited with his niece, Trump said to her "I’m pleased to inform you that not only has your uncle been released, but he is here tonight.” Trump also celebrated the release of prisoners, saying "since the raid we have worked with the new leadership and they have ordered the closure of that vile prison and released hundreds of political prisoners already, with more to come."

=== March–June events ===
On 1 March, Argentinian soldier Nahuel Gallo held in Rodeo I prison since 2024 and denounced of arbitrary detention at the International Court of Justice, was released.

On 5 March, Foro Penal reported that the current number of detainees is 526. Among them, 173 are military personnel and 49 are foreign citizens. By 8 March, 621 prisoners were released since 8 January.

The United Nations Human Rights Council-mandated Independent International Fact-Finding Mission on Venezuela called for the release of all political prisoners and in a statement on 12 March reported that the "repressive state" remained in Venezuela after capture of Nicolás Maduro on 3 January, indicating that "institutional structures facilitating human rights violations have not been dismantled". According to the Fact-Finding Mission, 87 politically motivated arrests had taken place since 3 January.

Lawyer Perkins Rocha and ally of María Corina Machado, released to house arrest in February, reported on 14 March that his amnestry was denied.

In April, Venezuelan government granted "alternative measures to deprivation of liberty for a group of individuals who were being held in detention, for their alleged or proven involvement in the commission of crimes provided for under the Venezuelan legal framework" to 51 people. By this date, Foro Penal reported that 485 political prisoners remain jailed.

On 19 May, National Assembly president Jorge Rodríguez announced that the Venezuelan government planned to release 300 detainees during the week. Rodríguez did not explicitly describe those scheduled for release as political prisoners, although the Associated Press reported that human rights defenders considered some of the detentions politically motivated. The announcement came amid renewed scrutiny over the in-custody death of Víctor Hugo Quero, who had been detained since January 2025 and whose death was not publicly reported by authorities until months later, as well as the death of his mother, Carmen Navas, who had continued seeking information about his whereabouts. Foro Penal estimated at the time that more than 400 people remained detained in Venezuela for political reasons. The announcement followed a statement by U.S. president Donald Trump the previous week that he would seek the release of all political prisoners in Venezuela.

On 20 May, Infobae, citing Foro Penal, reported that Erasmo Bolívar, Héctor Rovain and Luis Molina, three former officers of the defunct Caracas Metropolitan Police, had been released after 23 years in detention. The three had been arrested on 19 April 2003 in connection with events surrounding the failed 2002 coup against Hugo Chávez and were later convicted of attempted aggravated homicide in complicity. Infobae described them as the longest-held political prisoners in Venezuela; Reuters had reported the previous day that the planned releases would include three police officers held since 2003, as well as detainees with medical conditions and people over the age of 70.

On 9 June, 54 military detainees described by human rights groups as political prisoners were released, including three women. According to El País, the releases were confirmed by relatives and organizations including the Coalición por los Derechos Humanos y la Democracia and Foro Penal. Most of those released had been linked to the alleged military conspiracy known as Operation White Bracelet (Spanish: Operación Brazalete Blanco), which had been denounced by Venezuelan intelligence authorities several years earlier. The detainees had been held at Ramo Verde military prison and the National Institute for Women's Orientation (INOF). Among those released were Major Reinaldo Finol, detained in 2020 in an espionage case involving the American citizen Matthew John Heath; Sergeant José Sánchez Chacón, detained after sending a WhatsApp audio criticizing the condition of military units; and Lieutenant Karen Gómez, accused of involvement in sabotage of the electrical system. It was not immediately reported whether the releases amounted to full liberty or conditional measures. EFE reported, citing the Coalición por los Derechos Humanos y la Democracia, that 213 military personnel remained detained for political reasons after the releases.

=== Later events ===
US Secretary of State Marco Rubio met with Venezuelan minister of foreign affairs Oliver Blanco on 2 November calling for the their release and for free and fair elections. On 4 November, the BBC reported that over 1000 political prisoners were released since 3 January. Foro Penal reported 322 political prisoners still remained in detention.

== Protests and vigils outside prisons ==
2026 Venezuelan political prisoners release protests
- Part of the protests against Nicolás Maduro and Delcy Rodríguez, actions of the Venezuelan opposition and the aftermath of the 2026 United States intervention in Venezuela
- Date: 27 January 2026 – present (9 months, 1 week and 1 day)
- Location: Venezuela
- Caused by: Ongoing political and social crisis in Venezuela; Corruption and authoritarianism; Impact of 3 January 2026 United States intervention and the 2026 political prisoner release
- Goals: Further release of political prisoners; Resolution of the crisis in Venezuela; Snap, free and fair presidential election
- Methods: Hunger strikes; Political demonstrations
- Status: Ongoing: Negotiations between the government and the opposition start in August 2026; Maria Corina Machado returned to Venezuela after 10 months in exile

Parties
(Venezuela) Venezuelan opposition	Venezuelan government; Bolivarian National Armed Forces of Venezuela; (Venezuela) Bolivarian National Police

Lead figures
(Venezuela) Jesús Armas (Venezuela) Juan Pablo Guanipa (Venezuela) Dinorah Figuera; Support: (Venezuela) María Corina Machado (Venezuela) Edmundo González	Delcy Rodríguez (Venezuela) Jorge Rodríguez (Venezuela) Diosdado Cabello (Venezuela) Vladimir Padrino López

For weeks, Venezuelans camped outside the El Helicoide building, where many are detained, waiting for the release of their family members.

In Madrid, Spain, Venezuelans gathered in a square to demand the release of political prisoners on 10 January.

In Argentina, relatives of two Argentine citizens, security officer Nahuel Gallo and lawyer German Giuliani, detained in Venezuela in 2024 and 2025, respectively, requested the Holy See in the Vatican to pressure Venezuela to for their release.

During a visit by Delcy Rodríguez to the Central University of Venezuela on 27 January, students demanded her to pledge for the release of professors and students imprisoned for political reasons.

On 7 February dozens of family members of Venezuelan opposition members protested for the releases of their family members outside of the El Helicoide. On 12 February, hundreds of students and family members gathered at the Central University of Venezuela to demand the release of political prisoners. Similar rallies were also held in Venezuelan cities like Barquisimeto, Ciudad Guayana, Maracaibo and Mérida, and in Madrid, Spain. For the first time in many years, the protest were broadcast by TV network Venevisión. Opposition politician Jesús Armas who was freed on 8 January, participated and said "It’s a really weird moment because we are not really in a transition to democracy. We don’t have a date for a fair and free election. The same regime is in power [...] But at the same time, because of the pressure of the United States, we are starting to see things like the freedom of political prisoners and the people are starting to lose [their] fear."

Various families of detained Venezuelans started a hunger strike on 14 February to demand the liberation of 33 prisoners held in Zona 7 detention center. The daughter of Popular Will politician Fernando Orozco, joined the strike. Orozco was arrested with other 40 people in 2025, including his wife and son, his wife was later released due to health issues. Three women that participated in the fasting fell ill, one suffered from stomach cramps and another was transported to a hospital due to hypertensive crisis. After six days, only one man remained in the hunger strike. Orozco and his son were released in early March.

A prisoner hunger strike started on February 20, including approximately 214 prisoners in Rodeo I prison to demand their release after the amnesty bill passed into law. The Red Cross was able to visit the prison for the first time. About 30 prisoners were released on 23 February from Rodeo 1. Argentinian soldier Nahuel Gallo, one of the prisoners, was released on 1 March. In March, family members of the prisoners outside Zona 7 chained themselves to prison gates. 17 more were released on 8 March.

== International response ==
Italian prime minister Giorgia Meloni thanked Delcy Rodríguez on 12 January for the release of various Italian citizens, including businessman Mario Burlò and aid worker Alberto Trentini. Italian foreign minister Antonio Tajani said that the relations between Italy and Venezuela would improve as result.

Argentine president Javier Milei indicated on 24 January that the Argentine embassy in Caracas, besieged in 2025, will remain closed until all Argentine political prisoners held in Venezuela are released.

After the announcement of a meeting between Colombian president Gustavo Petro and Venezuelan acting president Delcy Rodríguez, Colombians gathered on 13 March at the Tienditas Bridge connecting Colombia and Venezuela to demand the release of Colombian political prisoners. However some people present reported losing hope after the meeting of Petro and Rodríguez was cancelled. At the time, Foro Penal indicated that 11 Colombian remain unjustly detained in Venezuelan prisons, with 8 already released.

== List of notable cases ==
=== Released prisoners ===
Name	Country	Detention date	Release date (detention period)
Rocío San Miguel	Spain-Venezuela	9 February 2024	8 January 2026 (1 year, 10 months and 30 days)
Biagio Pilieri	Italy-Venezuela	28 August 2024	8 January 2026 (1 year, 4 months and 11 days)
Enrique Márquez	Venezuela	7 January 2025	8 January 2026 (1 year and 1 day)
Alberto Trentini	Italy	15 November 2024	12 January 2026 (1 year, 1 month and 28 days)
Roland Carreño (Note: Previously detained from 2020 to 2023)	Venezuela	2 August 2024	14 January 2026 (1 year, 5 months and 12 days)
Carlos Julio Rojas	Venezuela	15 April 2024	14 January 2026 (1 year, 8 months and 30 days)
Rafael Tudares (Note: Son-in-law of opposition leader Edmundo González)	Venezuela	7 January 2025	22 January 2026 (1 year and 15 days)
Kennedy Tejeda	Venezuela	2 August 2024	25 January 2026 (1 year, 5 months and 23 days)
Eduardo Torres	Venezuela	13 May 2025	30 January 2026 (9 months and 17 days)
Javier Tarazona	Venezuela	3 July 2021	1 February 2026 (4 years, 6 months and 29 days)
Rory Branker	Venezuela	24 February 2025	4 February 2026 (11 months and 11 days)
María Oropeza	Venezuela	6 August 2024	8 February 2026 (1 year, 6 months and 2 days)
Jesús Armas	Venezuela	10 December 2024	8 February 2026 (1 year, 1 month and 29 days)
Luis Somaza	Venezuela	12 February 2025	8 February 2026 (11 months and 27 days)
Juan Pablo Guanipa (Note: Originally released on 8 February 2026 to house arrest.)	Venezuela	23 April 2025	19 February 2026 (9 months and 27 days)
Freddy Superlano	Venezuela	28 July 2024	27 February 2026 (1 year, 6 months and 30 days)
Nahuel Gallo (Note: Considered excluded from amnesty according to the bill passed on 19 February.)	Argentina	8 December 2024	1 March 2026 (1 year, 2 months and 21 days)
Fernando Orozco (Note: He was under arrest along with his son, both were released.)	Venezuela	24 November 2025	7 March 2026 (3 months and 11 days)
Erasmo Bolívar	Venezuela	19 April 2003	19 May 2026 (23 years and 1 month)
Héctor Rovain	Venezuela	19 April 2003	19 May 2026 (23 years and 1 month)
Luis Molina	Venezuela	19 April 2003	19 May 2026 (23 years and 1 month)

=== Released to house arrest ===
Name	Country	Detention date	House arrest date
Perkins Rocha	Venezuela	27 August 2024; 2 years ago	8 February 2026
