= Detention of Rocío San Miguel =

2024 detention of a Venezuelan activist

On 9 February 2024, Venezuelan activist Rocío San Miguel was detained at the Simón Bolívar International Airport in Maiquetía, near Caracas. Alongside her, two brothers, her ex-husband, and the father of her daughter were also detained. In response to the detention, international human rights organizations, such as Amnesty International, have called for San Miguel's immediate and unconditional release, citing a precautionary measure of protection issued by the Inter-American Commission on Human Rights (IACHR) in 2012.

== Detention and judicial process ==
"At El Helicoide, women are raped; Rocío San Miguel is in a torture center and we don't know under what condition"

— Víctor Navarro, president of the NGO Voces de la Memoria, 14 February 2024

On 9 February 2024, Rocío San Miguel Sosa was detained by at the Simón Bolívar International Airport near Caracas. The arrest was made under a warrant issued in the context of an investigation into a conspiratorial plot called "White Bracelet," which was described as an "attempted assassination of Nicolás Maduro and other officials." In addition to her, two brothers, her ex-husband Alejandro José González Canales, and other relatives, including Víctor Díaz Paruta, father of her daughter Miranda, were detained. Although Miranda was initially released, her current whereabouts are unknown, and she is presumed to be detained as well.

In response to the detention, international human rights organizations, such as Amnesty International, have called for the immediate and unconditional release of San Miguel, citing a precautionary measure of protection issued by the Inter-American Commission on Human Rights (IACHR) in 2012. The Inter-American Court of Human Rights had previously requested the Venezuelan state to report on the compliance with a favorable judgment for San Miguel in 2018, in relation to her dismissal from public charges in 2004 after supporting a recall referendum against then-president Hugo Chávez.

Legal actions against San Miguel have been criticized by various non-governmental organizations and opposition political figures. María Corina Machado and Henrique Capriles, among others, have denounced the detention as part of a series of acts of persecution and repression by the current government. Amnesty International has expressed concern over the enforced disappearance of San Miguel, while the NGO Provea and the Broad Front of Women have strongly rejected her arbitrary detention and disappearance.

== Reactions ==
The spokesperson for the White House, John Kirby, expressed Washington's "deep concern" about this event, underscoring the constant vigilance of the U.S. government over the situation of San Miguel. This situation has highlighted the tensions between the United States and the government of Nicolás Maduro in Venezuela. Washington has emphasized the need for Maduro to comply with previously acquired commitments, particularly in relation to the treatment of civil society, political opponents, parties, and presidential candidates. The spokesperson for the United States National Security Council has reiterated the importance of respecting the guarantees of political activists, in the context of San Miguel's detention. This stance shows specific concern for the repression against dissent in Venezuela, calling for its cessation and the protection of those who peacefully defend democracy.

The President of Uruguay, Luis Lacalle Pou, has taken a critical stance on the situation following the recent detention of activist Rocío San Miguel and five of her relatives. Referring to these events, Lacalle Pou stated that the situation in Venezuela is evidence of a dictatorship, highlighting the absence of free elections and the unjust detention of people. This comment came after Lacalle Pou asked the Uruguayan ambassador in Venezuela, Eber da Rosa, to report on the recent political events in the country. The Uruguayan president's concern is not only focused on San Miguel's detention but also on the setback of negotiations and the Barbados Agreement, which sought a solution to the Venezuelan crisis.

The Uruguayan Foreign Minister, Omar Paganini, reaffirmed this concern through a post on the social network X, mentioning the decision to call the ambassador in Venezuela for consultations on the concerning events that compromise the viability of free, democratic, and competitive elections in Venezuela. Additionally, the Uruguayan Ministry of Foreign Affairs had already expressed its concern about the disqualification of opponents in the Venezuelan elections, which they consider a contradiction to the Barbados Agreement signed last October with international guarantors.

On 13 February, the UN High Commissioner, Volker Türk, joined the voices expressing deep concern for the detention of Rocío San Miguel, president of the NGO Control Ciudadano. Two days later, the government's reaction was to suspend and accuse the organization of becoming "the private office" of a "group of coup plotters and terrorists," giving its staff three days to leave Venezuela. The office was established in 2019 when Michelle Bachelet held that position.

The Minister of Foreign Affairs of Spain, José Manuel Albares, had a telephone conversation with the Venezuelan regime's diplomat, Yván Gil. During this conversation, Albares expressed his concern for the detention of San Miguel and discussed the situation of the United Nations High Commissioner for Human Rights office in Venezuela, whose activities have recently been suspended by the Venezuelan government. Several dozen people, including members of the Venezuelan community, opponents, and friends of the Spanish-Venezuelan activist, gathered in Madrid during a vigil organized in the central parish of La Milagrosa. The purpose of this act was to demand the release of Rocío San Miguel and other political prisoners in Venezuela. This action by the Venezuelan government has raised condemnation and concern from numerous international organizations. Among them, the Independent International Fact-Finding Mission on Venezuela, the Inter-American Commission on Human Rights (IACHR), and Amnesty International have demanded that the Venezuelan government respect the rights of San Miguel and have criticized her detention.

The Panel of International Independent Experts on the possible commission of crimes against humanity in Venezuela, belonging to the Organization of American States (OAS), has expressed concern about the situation of Rocío San Miguel, a human rights defender and president of Control Ciudadano. The Panel observes that her arbitrary detention and enforced disappearance align with the pattern of crimes against humanity in Venezuela, a central theme of their reports since May 2018. The Panel, which was established in September 2017 by the Secretary General of the OAS, Luis Almagro, has revealed that San Miguel was a victim of enforced disappearance and subsequently transferred to the detention center known as El Helicoide.

== Release ==
On the aftermath of the 2026 United States strikes in Venezuela and capture of Nicolás Maduro, San Miguel was released on the 8 January 2026. The president of the National Assembly of Venezuela Jorge Rodríguez announced the liberation of a large number of prisoners. Rocío San Miguel was one of the first to be released.

== See also ==
- Detention of Juan Requesens
- Political prisoners in Venezuela
- Enforced disappearances in Venezuela
- Sippenhaft
