= Bachelet Report =

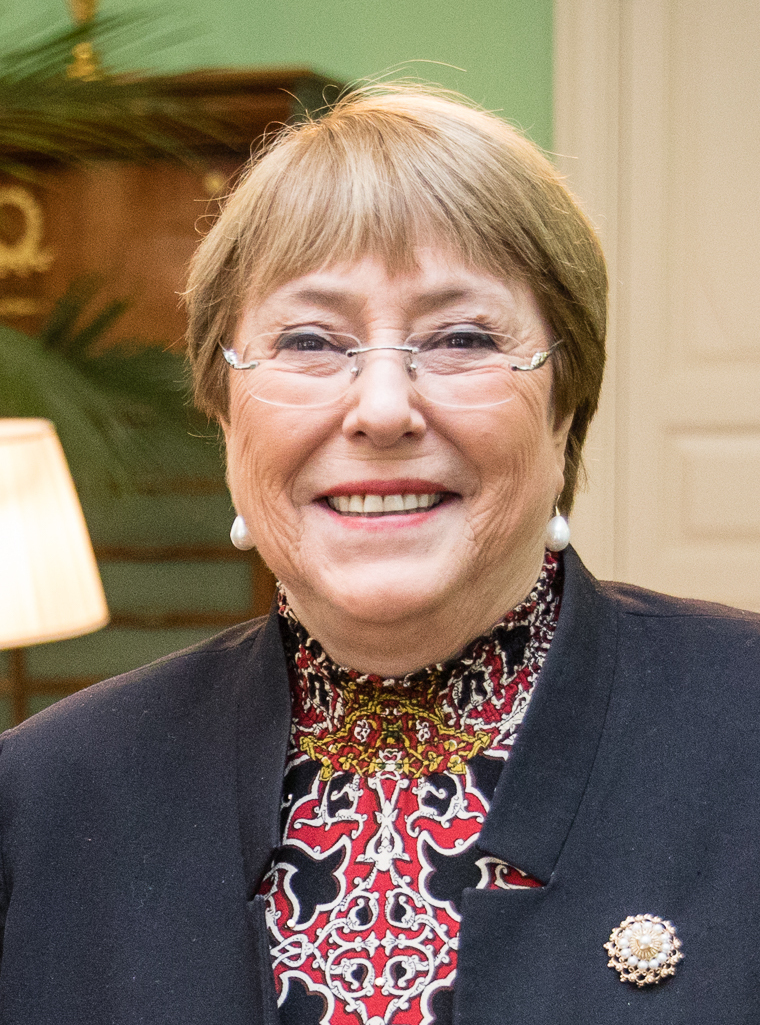
Michelle Bachelet in 2020.

The Bachelet report is the name given from the press to reports presented between 2019 and 2022 by then-United Nations High Commissioner for Human Rights, Michelle Bachelet, on the situation of the human rights in Venezuela, which was endorsed later by the United Nations Human Rights Council and opened the Independent International Fact-Finding Mission on Venezuela.

== 2019 Report ==
The United Nations Human Rights Council ordered an investigation, so its high commissioner, the former Chilean president Michelle Bachelet, visited Venezuela between June 19 and 21, 2019 and made 558 interviews with victims and witnesses of human rights violations.

After this Bachelet coordinated the writing of a report that consists of 18 pages where the situation of human rights in Venezuela is described and analyzed, denouncing the extrajudicial execution of 6,800 people by State forces in Venezuela between January 2018 and May 2019 and it is emphasized that especially since 2016 the presidency of Nicolás Maduro and the State institutions have put into practice a strategy "aimed at neutralizing, repressing and criminalizing the political opposition and those who criticize the government".

After the presentation of the report, Bachelet declared that the events "must be thoroughly investigated, establishing responsibilities for their authors, and guaranteeing their non-repetition".

The UN Human Rights Council endorsed the report that same year and the Independent International Fact-Finding Mission on Venezuela was opened. The Maduro government responded that "the report presents a selective and openly biased view of the true human rights situation" in the country.

== 2020 Report ==
Michelle Bachelet coordinated the update of the report, which was presented by Marta Valinas on behalf of the OHCHR and which updated the human rights situation in the country and called for “free, clean, transparent and credible” elections. The members of the UN Mission were not able to visit the country or meet with the political authorities on that occasion The report was endorsed by the Council of Human Rights of the UN that same year.

Human rights violations perpetrated by the Venezuelan security forces against political opponents, the military and members of civil society are described and that the authorities knew of the murders, tortures and cruel treatment, sexual violence, extrajudicial executions and enforced disappearances that had occurred since 2014. According to the UN document, the FAES was the most lethal police institution in Venezuela, responsible 64.5% of the deaths that the Mission examined in 2019. It was reported that Maduro government's security operations had murdered nearly 2,000 people between January and August 2020.

It is also described that "one of the elements that contribute to the violations and crimes determined by the Mission is the lack of independence of the judicial power" and it was reported how some judges and prosecutors have been subject to criminal prosecution as a result of the decisions they have adopted. The Argentine activist and Nobel Peace Prize winner, Adolfo Pérez Esquivel, criticized the report, calling it “partial".

== 2022 Report ==
Between May 2021 and April 2022, Bachelet's team visited 21 detention centers in Venezuela, where 259 interviews were carried out with detainees, achieving the release of 68. Bachelet declared in the presentation of the report that situations of harassment were found in the country. censorship and confiscation of professional equipment, as well as the blocking of web portals, in addition to the use of anti-terrorist and organized crime legislation to prevent the work of human rights defenders and journalists. She denounced, in turn, that his team was no longer allowed to investigate the human rights of those detained in the El Helicoide and Boleita prisons.

== Impact ==
Michelle Bachelet declared in 2022 that her efforts led to the release of 68 people (14 women among them) and the dissolution of the Special Action Forces (FAES).

== See also ==
- Michelle Bachelet
