= Viviana Krsticevic =

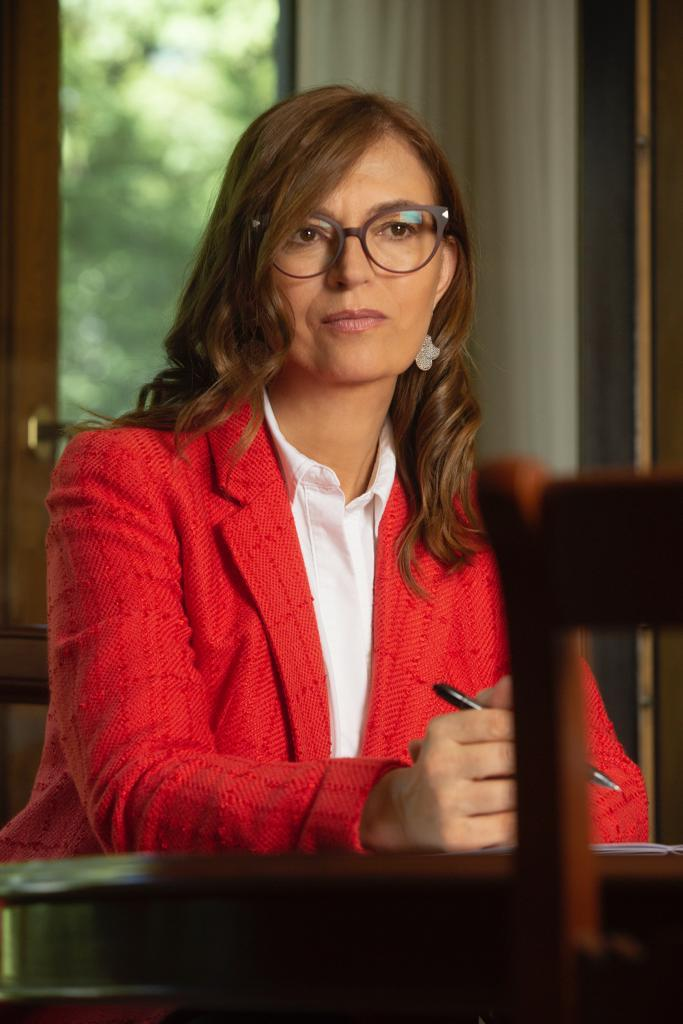
- Executive Director, CEJIL
- Born: 1967; Argentina
- Education: Harvard Law School
- Occupation: Human rights lawyer
- Employer: Center for Justice and International Law

Viviana Krsticevic is an international human rights lawyer from Argentina. Since 2022, she has been one of the three members of the Independent International Fact-Finding Mission on the Islamic Republic of Iran.

== Youth and education ==
Krsticevic obtained her Bachelor of Laws at the University of Buenos Aires, a Master of Arts degree in Latin American studies at Stanford University, and a Master of Laws at Harvard Law School.

== International human rights lawyer ==
Krsticevic's legal work has included representing victims of human rights violations in Latin America. She defended two hundred cases at the Inter-American Commission on Human Rights and the Inter-American Court of Human Rights and has been amicus curiae at the European Court of Human Rights.

Krsticevic has taught at the American University Washington College of Law. As of 2026, she has been the executive director of the human-rights non-governmental organization Center for Justice and International Law (CEJIL) since 2015 or earlier.

In November 2022, Krsticevic was appointed as one of the three volunteer (unsalaried) expert members of the Independent International Fact-Finding Mission on the Islamic Republic of Iran, along with Shaheen Sardar Ali from Pakistan and the chair of the mission, Sara Hossain from Bangladesh. The United Nations Human Rights Council (UNHRC) created the fact-finding mission to investigate human rights violations in the Mahsa Amini protests and provides administrative support staff for the three expert members of the mission.

== Points of view and activism ==
In 2015, Krsticevic criticised the ongoing human rights violations at Guantanamo Bay detention camp, including torture and the ongoing detention of 59 detainees who had been cleared of criminal charges and of 68 detainees classified as "indefinite detainees", which she described as a Kafkaesque legal term. She condemned the impunity for the suspected perpetrators of torture in the camp and for their command hierarchy.

Krsticevic co-founded a campaign for gender parity in international institutions called the "Gqual Campaign". In 2021, she argued that a report on the underrepresentation of women in international institutions by the Advisory Committee of the UNHRC could help to break the glass ceiling for women's participation in human-rights monitoring bodies and international courts. She expected that factors that would help achieve gender parity included improvements in communication and networking, as well as legal and institutional changes.

In 2024, Krsticevic stated that her experience in the Independent International Fact-Finding Mission on the Islamic Republic of Iran "strengthened [her] belief that the authoritarian playbooks can be cracked" by seeing a wide variety of Iranian women, supported by men, organising, speaking, and persistently insisting on equality and human rights.
