= Kennedy Tejeda =

Venezuelan lawyer and activist (born 2000)

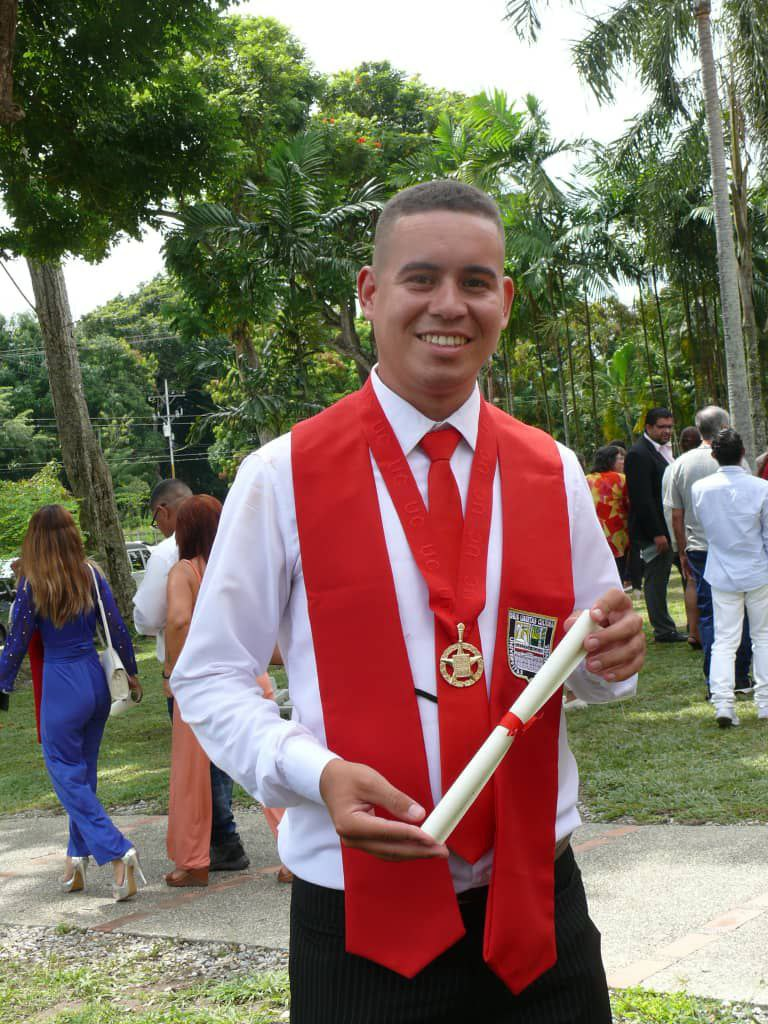
- Born: January 25, 2000 (age 26); Venezuela
- Occupations: Lawyer, human rights activist

Kennedy Tejeda (born January 25, 2000) is a Venezuelan lawyer and human rights activist. He has worked as a defense attorney and member of the human rights group Foro Penal in Carabobo State.

Tejeda was arrested on August 2, 2024 by security officials. Several human rights groups, including Amnesty International, the Inter-American Commission on Human Rights and Robert F. Kennedy Human Rights had called for his immediate release.

Tejeda was released from custody on January 25, during the 2026 political prisoner release in Venezuela.

== Arrest ==
On August 2, 2024, Tejeda disappeared after visiting a detention center in Montalbán earlier that morning to confirm the arrest of protestors in the community, and to offer them free legal assistance. Members of Foro Penal lost communication with him for 20 hours. A city official eventually informed his mother that he had been detained and allegedly transferred to the central command of the General Directorate of Military Counterintelligence in Valencia.

Foro Penal's coordinator in Carabobo, Luis Armando Betancourt, reported that Tejeda appeared before courts in Caracas with jurisdiction over terrorism cases, although his specific charges were unknown. He was denied access to private counsel, as well as family visits.

Foro Penal, the Inter-American Commission on Human Rights and Robert F. Kennedy Human Rights urged authorities to release him immediately, and to end the harassment persecution of human rights defenders in the country.

Tejera was released on January 25, 2026, after more than a year in detention.
