= Alfredo Romero =

Alfredo Romero may refer to:

- Alfredo Romero (athlete) (born 1972), Puerto Rican athlete
- Alfredo Romero (activist) (born 1969) Venezuelan lawyer and activist
