= International Fact-Finding Mission on Israeli Settlements =

The International Fact-Finding Mission on Israeli Settlements was a United Nations fact-finding mission created in March 2012 by the Human Rights Council, an agency of the United Nations, to "investigate the implications of the Israeli settlements on the civil, political, economic, social and cultural rights of the Palestinian people throughout the Occupied Palestinian Territory, including East Jerusalem. The mission was composed of Christine Chanet from France (Chair of the Mission), Asma Jahangir from Pakistan, and Unity Dow from Botswana.

== Report ==
=== Methods ===
Following a public call for submissions from interested parties, including representatives of Israeli settler communities, the mission received information from governments, inter-governmental organisations, international and national NGOs, professional bodies, academics, victims, witnesses and the media. It planned visits to both Israel and the occupied territories, to observe the situation on the ground, but was unable due to a lack of Israeli cooperation. In order to obtain first hand information the mission set up meetings in Jordan in which it met and interviewed various involved individuals and organisations.

=== Findings ===
The final report of the Mission was presented at a Human Rights Council session on 18 March 2013 in Geneva by Christine Chanet and Unity Dow. The report states Israel commits a multitude of human rights abuses against the Palestinian people and calls for nations and businesses to abide by the international legal regulations.

== Reactions ==
The report met with both full endorsement and rejection. Hanan Ashrawi, a member of the Executive Committee of the Palestine Liberation Organization, said: "This is incredible. We are extremely heartened by this principled and candid assessment of Israeli violations.(...) The UN Human Rights Council's call for sanctions against Israel is crucial because it clearly expresses the idea that the settlement enterprise leads to "ethnic cleansing" in the West Bank." Israeli newspaper Haaretz ran an Opinion Editorial by Saeb Erekat, the Chief Negotiator of the Palestinian Authority, in which he urged that "The UN report on Israeli settlements should be read by every single Israeli citizen. It is an opportunity for the international community to hold Israel accountable and end a culture of impunity that has all but destroyed the possibility of a two-state solution."

Representatives of Israel did not take the floor during the 18 March debate, and the Israeli Foreign Ministry dismissed the report, calling it "counterproductive" and saying that the Human Rights Council "has sadly distinguished itself by its systematically one-sided and biased approach towards Israel. This latest report is yet another unfortunate reminder of that." In a similar spirit, UN Watch, an Israel-affiliated non-governmental organisation, described the report as "categorically one-sided, casting Palestinians as the sole victims of the Arab–Israeli conflict, while denying the slightest consideration to any basic human rights for Israelis."

== See also ==
- Independent International Fact-Finding Mission on Venezuela
- UN fact-finding mission on Iran
