= Independent International Fact-Finding Mission on the Islamic Republic of Iran =

UN fact-finding mission in Iran

The Independent International Fact-Finding Mission on the Islamic Republic of Iran is a United Nations fact-finding mission created in April 2024 to investigate human rights violations in relation to the Mahsa Amini protests and the associated Woman, Life, Freedom movement. The mission published reports in early 2024 and 2025, finding evidence for crimes against humanity. In January 2026, the mission's scope was extended to investigation of the 2026 Iran massacres during the 2025–2026 Iranian protests.

== Creation ==
The Independent International Fact-Finding Mission on the Islamic Republic of Iran was created in November 2022 to investigate human rights violations related to the Woman, Life, Freedom movement, in Resolution S-35/1 of the United Nations Human Rights Council (UNHRC).

== Aims and members ==
The fact-finding mission was given a mandate to investigate suspected human rights violations during the protests, "especially with respect to women and children", "establish[ing] the facts and circumstances" of the violations, curating and archiving evidence for possible legal use, and communicating with the Iranian government, UN officials and bodies, and non-governmental organisations. The term of the mission was initially set from 24 November 2022 to the end of the UNHRC fifty-fifth session on 5 April 2024.

In November 2022, the mission's three independent members were Sara Hossain from Bangladesh, Shaheen Sardar Ali from Pakistan, and Viviana Krsticevic from Argentina, with Hossain as the chair. In July 2025, Ali was replaced by Max du Plessis from South Africa.

=== Extensions ===
In April 2024 and April 2025, the mission was extended successively through to April 2026. In the extension decided in April 2025, the mandate was extended beyond the Mahsa Amini protests to include "recent or ongoing serious human rights violations and crimes under international law". Amnesty International viewed the broadening beyond the Mahsa Amini protests to be a "landmark development".

In January 2026, in relation to the 2026 Iran massacres during the 2025–2026 Iranian protests, Human Rights Watch and the International Commission of Jurists called for the mission to investigate the massacres and to be given sufficient resources for its investigation. The United Nations Special Rapporteur on Human Rights in Iran stated that the mission's mandate could be extended and that the mission could investigate whether Ali Khamenei should be referred for investigation by the International Criminal Court. On 23 January, the UNHRC extended the mission by an extra two years in order to investigate the 2026 massacres.

== Reports ==
In February 2024, the mission published a summary report, finding "reasonable grounds to believe that" the Iranian authorities had carried out serious human rights violations, and that many of the violations were crimes against humanity. Human Rights Activists in Iran (HRA) stated that it "welcome[d]" the mission's report, in particular for the report's "recognition of the crime against humantiy of gender persecution".

In March 2025, the mission published an updated report, that provided "additional information and evidence that established new facts and circumstances of gross human rights violations and crimes against humanity" in relation to the Mahsa Amini protests. The mission found that Iranian security forces had widely carried out torture, sexual violence and rape, extrajudicial killings, violations of detainees' rights and harassment of victims' families.

In September 2026, the mission published a report concluding there was reasonable grounds to believe that the 2026 Minab school attack and 2026 Lamerd sports hall attack were conducted by the US, and that the strikes were indiscriminate attacks on civilians that constituted war crimes under international law.

== See also ==
- International Fact-Finding Mission on Israeli Settlements
- Independent International Fact-Finding Mission on Venezuela
