= Lorent Saleh =

Venezuelan activist

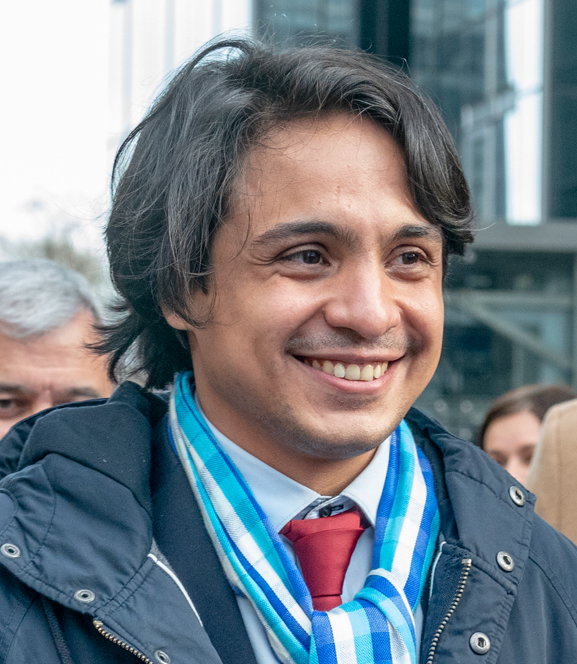
- Saleh in 2019
- Born: Lorent Enrique Gómez Saleh; 22 July 1988 (age 37); San Cristóbal, Táchira, Venezuela
- Occupation: Activist
- Awards: Sakharov Prize (2017)

Lorent Enrique Gómez Saleh (born 22 July 1988) is a prominent Venezuelan opposition activist and president of the Operación Libertad civil-rights group.

Saleh was arrested in Colombia in September 2014, where he had been since February aiming to raise awareness about Colombian guerillas allegedly being trained by the Venezuelan government. He was deported after Colombian authorities said he had been involved in political work that violated the terms of his visa. Gabriel Valles, who was working alongside Saleh, held a press conference about Saleh's arrest the following day, and was himself detained and deported to Venezuela.

Driven across the border, the men were separately handed over to the Bolivarian National Intelligence Service. Between 2014 and 2018, the men were held without trial in La Tumba, an underground prison in Caracas. A legal hearing for Saleh was postponed 52 times.

In 2017, Saleh was one of eight Venezuelans awarded the Sakharov Prize for Freedom of Thought by the European Parliament as a representative of all Venezuelan political prisoners documented by the human rights organisation Foro Penal (Penal Forum).

On 12 October 2018, he was released by the Venezuelan authorities and immediately exiled to Spain.

== Activism ==
In 2009, Saleh cofounded an organisation in opposition to the government of Venezuelan President Hugo Chávez. In February 2011, he began a hunger strike in front of the headquarters of the Organization of American States (OAS) in Caracas with 13 other young people as the national coordinator of the Active Youth Organization Venezuela Unida (JAVU). demanding the release of Biaggio Pilieri, José Sánchez Mazuco and Judge María Lourdes Afiuni, among other people considered as political prisoners, and asking Secretary General José Miguel Insulza to be "more forceful in the face of the government's crimes." Saleh was accused the same year of the crime of "disseminating false information that causes distress" along with Gabriel Vallés, another student activist, when they were arrested with slingshots and other materials to use during the protests and with posters pointing at then-President Chávez to lying about his electoral promises.

On 2 May 2011, members of the Bolivarian National Guard fired shots at some demonstrators and evicted several youths, including Saleh, who had chained themselves to the gates of the Judicial Circuit of Barinas to demand the release of Delfín Parra Gómez, a military man who was processed. for alleged corruption in the Central Agroindustrial Azucarero Ezequiel Zamora (Caeez) and whom the youth considered a political prisoner. Saleh was severely beaten and detained, and as a result of the event, judicial proceedings were opened for the alleged crimes of resistance to authority, basic type injuries and violent outrage against a public official. His mother, Yamileth Saleh, was also imputed during the presentation hearing. At the beginning of July, Saleh was arrested by the Bolivarian Intelligence Service (SEBIN) while he was arriving at a peaceful protest on Urdaneta Avenue, in Caracas. He was released hours later. In December he is arrested again by unidentified individuals after landing at the Santo Domingo airport in Táchira.

In 2012, Saleh's NGO Operación Libertad launched an international campaign in rejection of the departure of Venezuela from the Inter-American Human Rights System. Saleh was beaten by military personnel while participating in a protest at the University of the Andes. Days later, in January 2013, when trying to travel to Costa Rica, airport authorities of Valencia, Carabobo prevented him from boarding the plane and canceled his passport. After accusations that at the end of July 2013 Saleh participated in Colombia in the launching of the far-right Nationalist Alliance for Freedom, a political movement that defines itself as "Identitarian nationalist" and "anti-Zionist", and includes Colombian neo-Nazi organisation Tercera Fuerza. Saleh claimed months later in an interview with El Espectador: "I am Latin American, of Palestinian family, I can not believe in Nazi, neo-Nazi or radical positions of any kind, I am not Neo-Nazi nor do I believe in militarist governments."

In February 2014, Saleh began an international campaign to denounce human rights violations during the 2014 Venezuelan protests. In Costa Rica he got the attention of the Congress, members of the Church and important figures of the country. On February 19, seven days after the start of the protests, the death of three people in Caracas and the handing over of Leopoldo López to the Venezuelan authorities, Saleh traveled again to Colombia. On 2 May, Venezuelan Interior Minister Miguel Rodríguez Torres claimed that Henrique Salas Römer financed the JAVU group and read a supposed document with confidential information dated 2011, about supposed "training camps" held in Carabobo by the group on a farm property of Venezuelan opposition deputy Freddy Curupe, in which Saleh is mentioned.

== Deportation and detention at La Tumba ==
On 4 September, Saleh notified several friends that there was a suspicious car circulating around his residence in Bogotá. Hours later he was arrested in an operation that the Migration Office of Colombia justified in a decree that signals the deportation of foreigners when they represent a threat to national security or if they are requested by the authorities of other countries. The same day, he was handed over to SEBIN officials in San Cristóbal and the Migration Office of San Antonio del Táchira. Upon arriving in Venezuela, Saleh was accused of three other crimes for having falsified, while working for the Venezuelan immigration service, identity documents for Colombian citizens to participate in violent demonstrations in Venezuela. His family and his lawyer stated that Saleh has never worked for the immigration service or for any other Venezuelan government office. In several television interventions, pro-government leaders accused Saleh of having links with Colombian paramilitaries and former Colombian President Álvaro Uribe, and of planning coup and terrorist activities in Venezuela, but these accusations are not included in his court file.

On 2 March 2015, the Inter-American Commission on Human Rights (IACHR) issued precautionary measures of protection in resolution 6/2015 in favor of Lorent Saleh and Gerardo Carrero in response to the request made on 8 July 2013 by Tamara Sujú on behalf of the Foro Penal, in which he asked the agency to require the Venezuelan government to protect the life and personal integrity of Saleh and, later in the proceedings, also the protection of Carrero for the violation of his human rights. The IACHR document notes that Saleh and Guerrero "would be located in a basement (five floors below ground), known as La Tumba ("The Tomb"), of the building that serves as the main headquarters of the SEBIN, where they are subjected to "prolonged isolation without contact with other people, in a confined space of 2 × 3 meters, with video cameras and microphones in each of their cells, without access to sunlight or outdoors," and the two prisoners have reported suffering from "nervous breakdowns, stomach problems, diarrhea, vomiting, spasms, joint pains, headaches, dermatitis, panic attacks, muscle disorders and temporary disorientation" without "presumably receiving adequate medical attention." The Commission considered that the students "are in a situation of seriousness and urgency, since their lives and personal integrity would be at risk", and in accordance with Article 25 of the IACHR's Rules of Procedure, the agency asked the Venezuelan government to adopt the measures necessary to preserve the life and personal integrity of detainees, in particular to provide adequate medical care in accordance with the conditions of their pathologies, and to ensure that their detention conditions are in accordance with international standards, taking into consideration their current health status. On 20 April 2015, Lorent tried to commit suicide in his cell, which was stopped by SEBIN officials. His lawyer denounced that by then he had not received a response from the Public Ministry about the request for psychiatric evaluations of Saleh and Gabriel Valles.

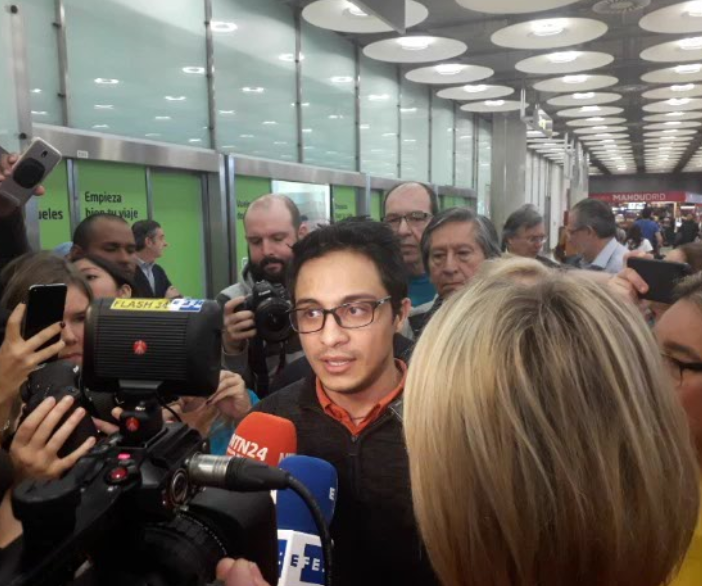
Saleh at his arrival at the Madrid–Barajas Airport in October 2018

In 2017, Saleh was one of eight Venezuelans awarded the Sakharov Prize, along with other detainees considered political prisoners by the European Parliament. In November, after the deferment of the preliminary hearing of Lorent 42 times, his relatives requested his immediate release to the Attorney General appointed by the Constituent National Assembly, Tarek William Saab, explaining that if a trial is not initiated two years after the arrest, the accused must be released immediately. By 4 September 2018, his hearing had been deferred 52 times.

== Release and exile ==
On 12 October 2018, Saleh was released due to "suicidal behavior" and immediately forced to leave Venezuela. He was secretly transferred to Simón Bolívar International Airport and arrived at Madrid–Barajas Airport on 13 October at 10:15 in the morning.

On 22 January 2024, the Colombian justice system condemned the Colombian state for the irregular expulsion of Lorent Saleh in 2014, sentencing it to pay 195 million pesos for the moral and material damages caused to Lorent Saleh and his mother.

== See also ==
- Political prisoners in Venezuela
- Torture in Venezuela
- White torture
