= Enrique Márquez (Venezuelan politician) =

Venezuelan politician (born 1963)

- Márquez in 2024

Vicepresident of National Electoral Council
- In office 5 May 2021 – 20 June 2023
- President: Pedro Calzadilla
- Preceded by: Leonardo Morales Poleo
- Succeeded by: Carlos Quintero

Member of the National Assembly for Zulia
- In office 5 January 2011 – 5 January 2021
- In office 14 August 2000 – 5 January 2006

Personal details
- Born: Enrique Octavio Márquez Pérez; 19 May 1963 (age 63) Maracaibo, Venezuela
- Party: Radical Cause
- Education: University of Zulia

Enrique Octavio Márquez Pérez (Note: In this name that follows Hispanic American naming customs, the first or paternal surname is Márquez and the second or maternal family name is Pérez.) (born 19 May 1963) is a Venezuelan opposition leader and was a candidate in Venezuela's 2024 presidential election. On January 7, 2025, he was arrested by security forces and accused of planning a coup. He was released during the 2026 political prisoner release in Venezuela.

== Early life and education ==
Márquez was born in Maracaibo and attended the University of Zulia where he studied electrical engineering; he later taught there after getting a graduate degree in the United Kingdom.

== Political career ==
His political life began in co-founding the 20th Movement (student mobilization against the political system) at the university. He later joined the syndicalist La Causa Radical party. He was elected deputy to the National Assembly for Zulia, 2000–2006, representing the party. In 2006 he joined the presidential campaign of Manuel Rosales who competed against Chávez In March 2007, he supported the No the option to the 2007 constitutional referendum, a defeat for Hugo Chávez in his attempt to expand government powers. Elected to two further terms in the assembly, 2011–2021, he was vice-president of the National Assembly from 2016 to 2017. In the 2017 referendum he supported the opposition option. Representing the Centrados party, Márquez was a candidate for Venezuela's 2024 presidential elections. Along with Edmundo González, they were the only candidates to refuse to sign an agreement with the government of Nicolás Maduro before the 2024 election to respect the outcome of the election. His presidential candidacy was endorsed by the several parties, including the Communist Party of Venezuela.

== Arrest and release ==
Márquez was vigorous in accusing Maduro of fixing the 2024 presidential election, which was "plagued with irregularities." He was arrested along with six other opposition leaders in January 2025. At the same time other opponents disappeared or were kidnapped. During captivity he was isolated, had no legal defense and was not put on trial.

According to Márquez, he passed the first seven days in prison handcuffed, interrogated frequently. He passed three months without seeing sunlight and 10 months incommunicado.

=== Release ===
He was freed on January 8, 2026, along with various other political prisoners, after the U.S. capture of Maduro. During the 2026 State of the Union Address in United States, president Donald Trump celebrated the capture of Nicolás Maduro and invited Márquez. Márquez reunited with his niece, Trump said to her "I’m pleased to inform you that not only has your uncle been released, but he is here tonight”.
