= Crimes against humanity by the Islamic Republic of Iran =

Crimes against humanity by the Islamic Republic of Iran were announced by the United Nations Fact-Finding Mission on Friday, 8 March 2024.

== Background ==
On 24 November 2022, the United Nations Human Rights Council, in a special session on the crackdown on the Woman, Life, Freedom protests by the government of the Islamic Republic of Iran, adopted a resolution that established the Fact-Finding Mission on the repression of protesters in Iran.

From its inception, the Fact-Finding Mission was tasked with investigating the deteriorating human rights situation in Iran, particularly with regard to women and children.

The UN Human Rights Council assigned the Mission a number of tasks, including conducting a full and independent investigation of human rights violations, particularly those affecting Iranian women and children in the context of the nationwide protests; examining complaints and violations; and collecting, analysing and preserving evidence relating to them.

The Mission raised questions about the widespread use of various forms of torture against detainees and protesters, including flogging, beatings, denial of medical treatment, prolonged solitary confinement, threats and psychological abuse.

=== Publication of the Fact-Finding Mission's report ===
On Friday, 8 March 2024, the UN Fact-Finding Mission published its findings and announced that "discrimination and repression of women in Iran amount to crimes against humanity". The Mission stated explicitly that many of the serious human rights violations set out in its report "constitute crimes against humanity, in particular the crimes of murder, imprisonment, torture, rape and other forms of sexual violence, persecution, enforced disappearance and other inhumane acts, committed as part of a widespread and systematic attack against a civilian population, namely women, girls and others who support human rights."

Based on "reasonable grounds", the Mission concluded from "the totality of the conduct of the authorities", including statements by government officials, the continued impunity enjoyed by perpetrators of human rights violations, and the state's failure to condemn such conduct, that the acts committed were in furtherance of a state policy.

The Mission also stated that it was "particularly satisfied" that the attacks were planned, directed and organised by, and in coordination with, various institutions of the Iranian state, with the investment of significant state resources.

== Response of the Islamic Republic of Iran ==
The Iranian foreign minister described the establishment of the Mission as "the creation of imposed mechanisms against Iran under pretexts such as fact-finding" and said that the UN's decision had "no logical basis and no international legal legitimacy".

== See also ==
- Human rights in Iran
- Independent International Fact-Finding Mission on the Islamic Republic of Iran
- Woman, Life, Freedom
- Mahsa Amini protests
- Responsibility to protect
