= Alfredo Romero (activist) =

Venezuelan activist and lawyer

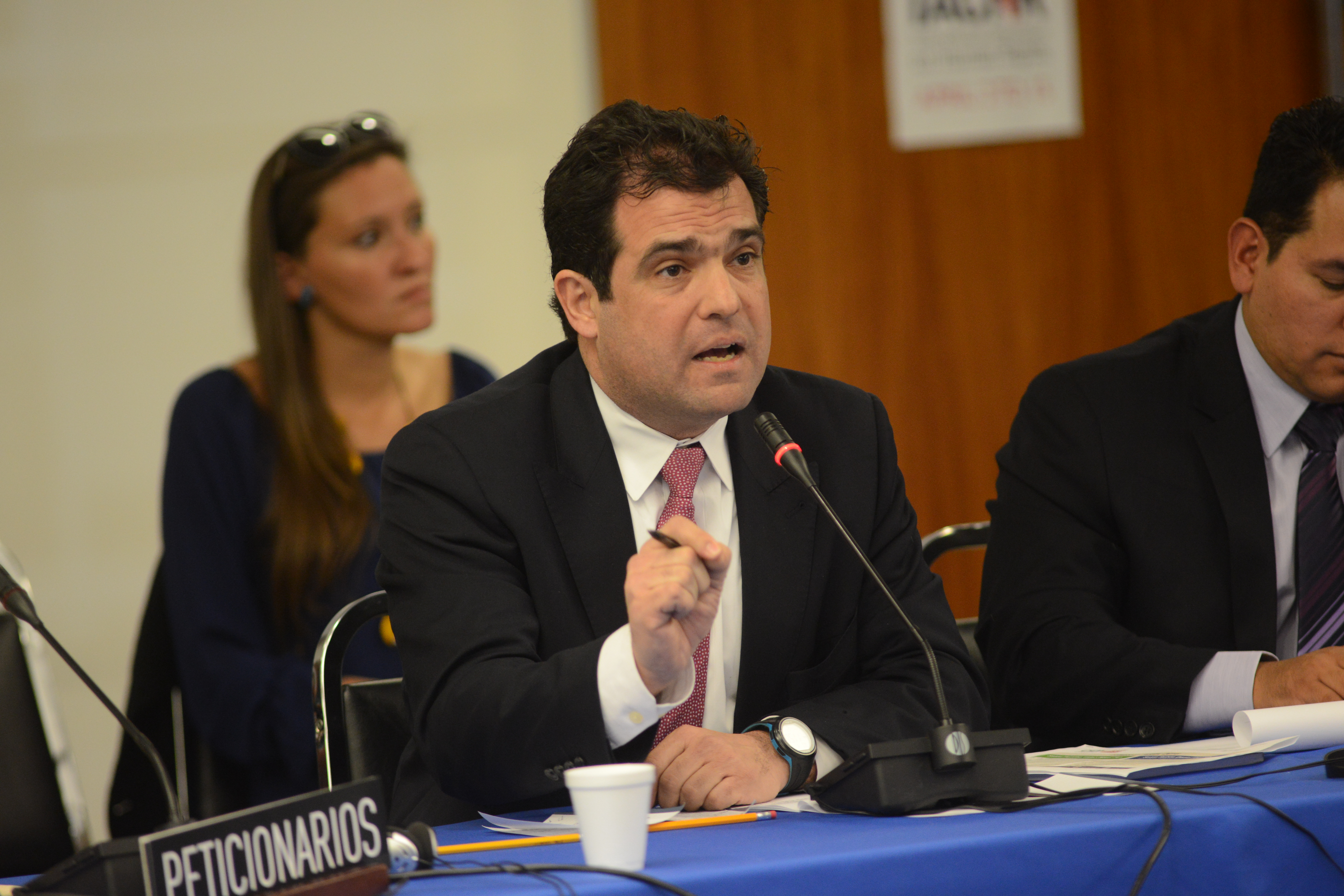
- Born: 7 January 1969 (age 57); Caracas, Venezuela
- Education: Universidad Católica Andrés Bello
- Occupations: Activist, lawyer, university professor
- Awards: Robert F. Kennedy Human Rights Award (2017)

Alfredo Romero Mendoza (born 7 January 1969) is a Venezuelan lawyer, human rights activist and executive director of the non-governmental organization Foro Penal. He received the Robert F. Kennedy Human Rights Award in 2017.

== Career ==
Alfredo Romero graduated as a lawyer in the Andrés Bello Catholic University in 1991, received a master's degree in Latin American studies in Georgetown University in 1994 and afterwards a master's degree in financial public law in the University of London in 1997. Between 2001 and 2002 he was rapporteur of the Constitutional Chamber of the Supreme Tribunal of Justice and in 2002 he founded the civil association VIVE (Victims of Violence in Violation of Human Rights; Spanish: Víctimas Venezolanas de Violaciones a los Derechos Humanos), representing the victims of the April 11, 2002 Llaguno Overpass events. This firm later merged with the non-governmental organization Foro Penal. In 2008 he was an independent pre-candidate for mayor of Baruta.

Romero has been awarded several recognitions for his work in human rights. He has been member of the Global Agenda Council in rule of law in the World Economic Forum, and in 2007 he was recognized as a "World Young Leader" by the Forum. In 2009 Romero received the honour diploma from the Venezuelan Lawyers Association as recognition for his effort to improve judicial institutions and recognition as public servant by Rotary International. In 2014 he was awarded the Bicentennial Order by the National Lawyers Association, the highest recognition of that institution in the country. Romero was named as the 2017 Robert F. Kennedy Human Rights Award laureate, an award given to individuals around the world "who show courage and have made a significant contribution to human rights in their country."

He has also worked as law professor in the Central University of Venezuela and the Andrés Bello Catholic University, is member of the Himiob Romero law firm and currently is executive director of Foro Penal, as well as member of the Harvard Kennedy School Carr Center for Human Rights Policy.

Romero is the author of the book Relatos de muerte en vivo. Also, he is co-author of the book Crímenes de Lesa Humanidad, una perspectiva venezolana.

== Personal life ==
Alfredo Romero plays the guitar.

== See also ==
- Gonzalo Himiob
- Carlos Correa
- Liliana Ortega
- Rocío San Miguel
