= Revolving door effect =

Political term related to human rights abuses

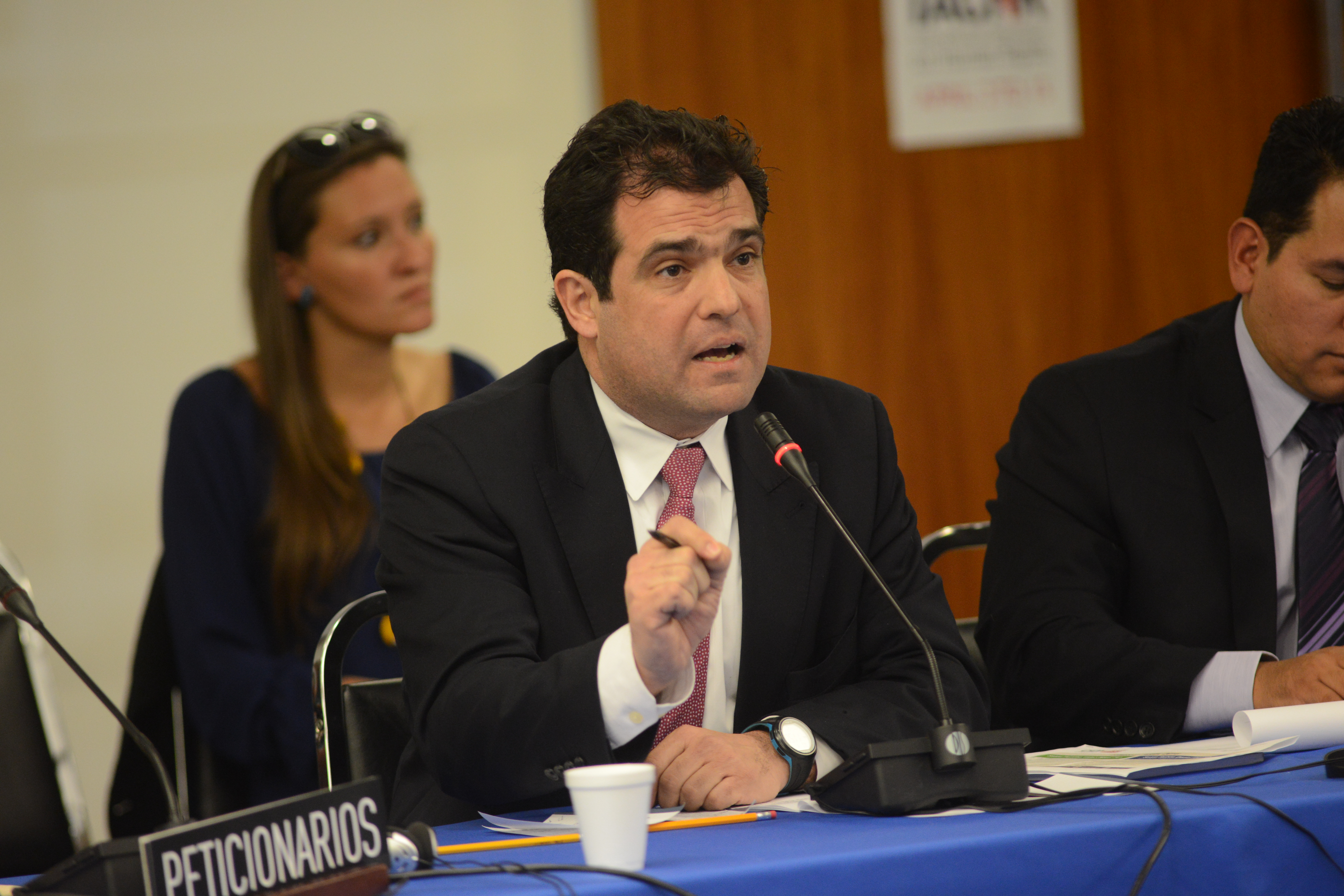
Alfredo Romero, Venezuelan lawyer and activist who coined the term

The revolving door effect (Spanish: Efecto puerta giratoria) is a term to describe the situation in which, while political prisoners are released, new imprisonments take place at the same time or within a few days, so that the number of political prisoners remains constant. The term was coined by Venezuelan activist Alfredo Romero, director of the NGO Foro Penal.

== Terminology ==
The term was coined by Venezuelan activist Alfredo Romero, director of the NGO Foro Penal, in his research as a guest of the Carr Center at Harvard Kennedy School at Harvard University.

== Application ==
=== Venezuela ===
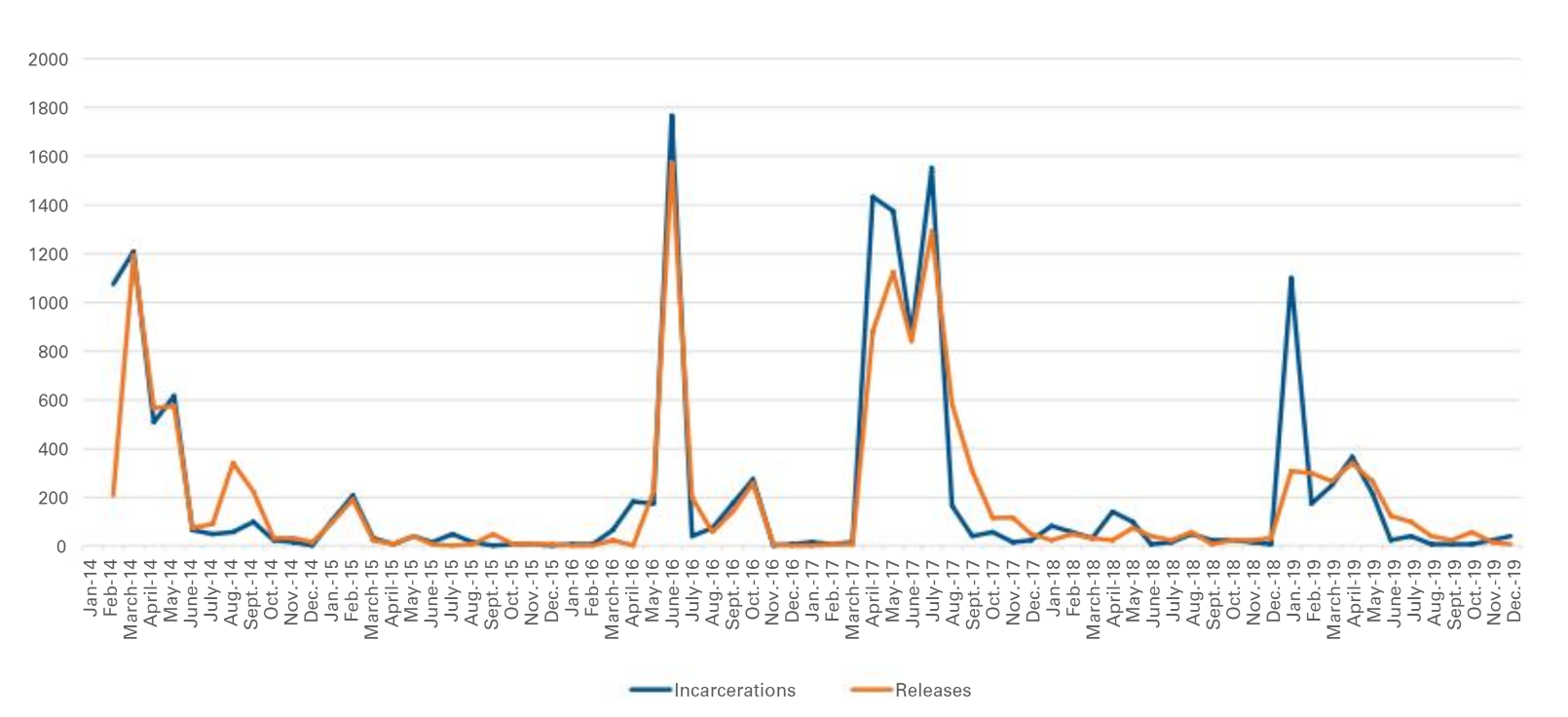
Graph illustrating the revolving door effect in Venezuela, plotting detentions and releases in the country between 2014 and 2019. Arrests Releases

The revolving door effect has been denounced on several occasions in Venezuela. Alfredo Romero stated that in the course of 2016 the number of people imprisoned exceeded the number of those released. In 2017, political prisoners who had been imprisoned for one, two or even three years were released and new people were arrested afterwards. For instance, audiovisual producer Héctor Pedroza Carrizo was detained without a warrant by agents of the National Guard's Anti-Extortion and Kidnapping Command (CONAS) at his home.

In 2018, the National Constituent Assembly announced the release of 79 people, but only 40 of the cases consisted in political prisoners from a list made up of 237 civilians and 79 military personnel by then. Those released from prison were required to present themselves periodically before the Constituent Assembly and not before the courts, something irregular.

Romero elaborated on the phenomenon again in a July 2020 Wilson Center publication, "The Clock of Repression," noting the correlation between the releases and new arrests shortly thereafter.

=== Cuba ===
The mechanism was implemented in Cuba since 2003. That year saw Cuba's Black Spring, which consisted of the kidnapping, beatings and imprisonment of 75 dissidents. After long years of international negotiations and campaigning on their behalf, they were all released. They were offered to leave the island, which was accepted by some of them and others opted to stay; they suffered express kidnappings and forced disappearances for a few days and hours, being accused of minor common crimes and constantly besieged by security agents first and then by supporters of the communist party.

=== Myanmar ===
In 2016, the term was used by Burma Campaign UK to refer to the situation of political prisoners in Myanmar.

=== Nicaragua ===
NGOs in Nicaragua have denounced that Daniel Ortega's regime implements the "revolving door" mechanism with his government's political prisoners.

== See also ==
- Enforced disappearances in Venezuela
- Political prisoners in Venezuela
