= Alejandro Peña Esclusa =

Venezuelan writer

Leader of Fuerza Solidaria
- Incumbent
- Assumed office May 2001

Alejandro Peña Esclusa (born 3 July 1954) is a Venezuelan writer and political consultant. He is a mechanical engineer by profession, graduated in 1977 from the Universidad Simón Bolívar, in Caracas. He studied financial administration at the Instituto de Estudios Superiores de Administración in Caracas, in 1981, and completed a master's degree in security and defense at the Instituto de Altos Estudios de Defensa Nacional de Venezuela, in 1987. He is president of the NGO Fuerza Solidaria and founder of the Unión de Organizaciones Democráticas de América (UnoAmerica).

Peña Esclusa was a candidate for the presidency of Venezuela in 1998. He was an early critic of Hugo Chávez's links with the Cuban government and the Colombian guerrilla. He was imprisoned in El Helicoide without trial in 2010, which was criticized by human rights activists as politically motivated. He was released the following year following international pressure, but with a ban on leaving the country, carrying a passport, expressing an opinion on any subject, using social networks and engaging in political activities. His case was presented before the Inter-American Commission on Human Rights (IACHR) and before the International Criminal Court in The Hague.

Peña Esclusa has written five books about the São Paulo Forum. He supports consolidation of democracies to counteract the forum and advocates Ibero-American integration.

== Early life ==
Alejandro Peña Esclusa was born 3 July 1954 in Washington, D.C., the son of a Venezuelan Army General, Enrique Peña Briceño. He graduated in mechanical engineering from the Universidad Simón Bolívar in 1977, and in 1980 obtained a postgraduate degree in finance from the Instituto de Estudios Superiores de Administración (IESA). In 1978 he won the national karate championships, and in 1981 gained a civil aviation licence. He married Indira Ramírez in 1989, and had three daughters.

== Political career ==
=== Early years ===
Peña Esclusa first became involved in politics in 1984, when he found he was not satisfied by the platform of any political parties. In 1985, he helped distribute Lyndon LaRouche's book Narcotráfico, S.A. ("Dope, Inc."), and by 1988 he was the leader of the Partido Laboral Venezolano (PLV, Venezuelan Labor Party), a party which he co-founded as the Venezuelan branch of LaRouche's International Caucus of Labor Committees, modelled on LaRouche's U.S. Labor Party. He split with the LaRouche movement in spring 1998. Peña Esclusa himself dates the split to 1995.

=== Opposition to Chávez ===
According to his wife, Alejandro Peña Esclusa has been an opponent of Hugo Chávez since 1994 when he denounced Chávez for supporting Cuban leader Fidel Castro. He published an article in 1995 attacking the Foro de São Paulo, which Chávez' Fifth Republic Movement joined that year. Peña Esclusa entered the 1998 Venezuelan presidential election as a candidate for PLV, and was also a candidate on another occasion. He announced his candidacy in July 1998, with Chavez already the front runner. On 28 July 2000, Peña Esclusa formally accused Chávez of treason, denouncing him to the Attorney General, which rejected the claim.

In May 2001, Peña Esclusa founded the non-governmental organization Fuerza Solidaria. It opposed Cuba and organised a range of political protests against Chávez, including a demonstration in front of the Cuban embassy. In February 2002, Peña Esclusa, on behalf of Fuerza Solidaria, called for the general strike being organised to be indefinite, until Chávez resigned. Following the 2002 Venezuelan coup d'état attempt, Peña Esclusa was briefly detained on suspicion of links to military officers allegedly involved. According to the Latin American Weekly Report, Esclusa was arrested and questioned for the 17 September 2002 publication of newspaper advertisements, sponsored by Fuerza Solidaria, urging the armed forces to "restore constitutional order" in the country by deposing President Chavez. Peña Esclusa himself has denounced violence as a method, and said that he does not believe that violence could end Hugo Chávez's government, but that a peaceful mass movement could.

Traveling North and South America as well as Europe, Peña Esclusa has said that Chávez was allowing Russia and Iran to use Venezuela as a base for strategic bombers, submarines, warships, and long range missiles capable of reaching the United States. He has also alleged crimes against humanity perpetrated by the regime, and links with terrorist groups.

=== UnoAmerica ===
In December 2008 Peña Esclusa co-founded and became president of UnoAmerica, an organization that describes itself as "a confederation of NGOs" working to combat Latin American left parties connected to the Sao Paulo Forum, which it accuses of "introduc[ing] Marxist ideological models that divide our societies into factions based on class and race, promoting hate, violence and anarchy" and of "destroying democracy from within".

UnoAmerica and Peña Esclusa endorsed the legality of deposing Honduran president Manuel Zelaya by the Supreme Court of Honduras during the nation's 2009 coup d'état. Peña Esclusa called for similar action in Venezuela. In August 2009, Peña Esclusa formally accused Venezuela's president Hugo Chávez before the International Criminal Court of crimes against humanity for supporting Manuel Zelaya's attempt to regain power and threatening to invade Honduras to reinstall him. In November 2009, Peña Esclusa was decorated with the "José Cecilio del Valle" medal by Honduran president Roberto Micheletti.

=== Imprisonment ===
In 2010, the Venezuelan government accused Peña Esclusa of being an accomplice in an alleged plan by Francisco Chávez Abarca to use violence to disrupt the 2010 parliamentary elections. Peña Esclusa posted a video online denying the accusations and said that he expected to be arrested within a day. He was arrested in his home by the Bolivarian Intelligence Service (SEBIN) that evening, accused of possession of explosives. Peña Esclusa's wife declared that search officers planted explosives in the desk of the couple's eight-year-old daughter. His lawyer, Alfredo Romero, accused 13 members of the political police of violating his client's constitutional rights at the search and arrest by not allowing his lawyer to be present or to inspect the search order. Luis Cabrera, the presiding judge, ruled that the presence of the lawyer could lead to impunity, to which Romero commented, "This court has declared dead the right to defense in Venezuela."

Peña Esclusa was denied bail on 15 July 2010. The preliminary hearings were held January 27, 2011, and the defense appealed on February 7. The defense objected to the fact that the court has denied every request to order the presence of the primary witness of the prosecutor for cross-examination, since Francisco Chávez Abarca had been sent to Cuba just before Peña Esclusa's arrest in accordance with an Interpol red notice. FuerzaSolidaria published Peña Esclusa's petition in court, in which he accused the judge of acting politically and the prosecutor of lying about statements allegedly made by Chávez Abarca.

On March 29, 2011, Indira de Peña Esclusa and other wives of prisoners of Chávez petitioned the Inter-American Commission on Human Rights that their husbands should be recognized as political prisoners by OAS.

Opposition deputy María Corina Machado said Peña Esclusa was a prisoner due to his opinions. Cardinal Jorge Urosa of the Catholic Church in Venezuela said he was certain Peña Esclusa was innocent and demanded his release. In a letter dated 2011, nine senators from Bolivia wrote to Hugo Chávez and demanded that he release Alejandro Peña Esclusa, whom they describe as being imprisoned illegally in order to silence him, and that he the time he was imprisoned was heading a group of lawyers who were preparing a prosecution of Hugo Chávez for Crimes Against Humanity.

Peña Esclusa was released from prison on 20 July 2011.

== Books ==
- Government Program: How to make of Venezuela an industrial power
- 350: Cómo salvar a Venezuela del castro-comunismo, Caracas: Ediciones Fuerza Productiva, June 2005
- The Continent of Hope September 2006
- Classical art and good government
- The Foro de São Paulo: A Threat to Freedom in Latin America, Bogotá: Mary Montes Edition, February 2009
- The Sao Paulo Forum against Álvaro Uribe
- The Sao Paulo Forum, a Continental Threat
- The Sao Paulo Forum's Plan to Destroy the Armed Forces (compilation)
- From Chávez's dungeons
- The Sao Paulo Forum's cultural warfare (in its different editions and translations)
- The electoral frauds of the Sao Paulo Forum (in its different editions and translations)

== See also ==
- Political prisoners in Venezuela
