= Foro Penal =

Venezuelan NGO focused on human rights

- Formation: 22 June 2005
- Type: Non-profit NGO
- Location: Venezuela
- Fields: Human rights activism
- Director: Alfredo Romero
- Website: foropenal.com

Foro Penal (transl. Penal Forum) is a Venezuelan human rights organization that provides legal assistance pro bono to people subject of arbitrary detentions and their relatives. The organization is composed of regional coordinators for each state in Venezuela, pro bono lawyers on a national level and a network of over five thousand volunteers, non-lawyer activists, known as "active defensors".

== Structure ==
Foro Penal is constituted as a civil association composed of regional coordinators for each state in Venezuela, pro bono lawyers on a national level and a network of over five thousand volunteers, non-lawyer activists, known as "active defensors". The directive board is made up of Alfredo Romero, director president, Gonzalo Himiob, director vicepresident.

The organization publishes reports documenting the number of arbitrary detentions and political prisoners in Venezuela, figures that are certified by the Organization of American States.

== History ==
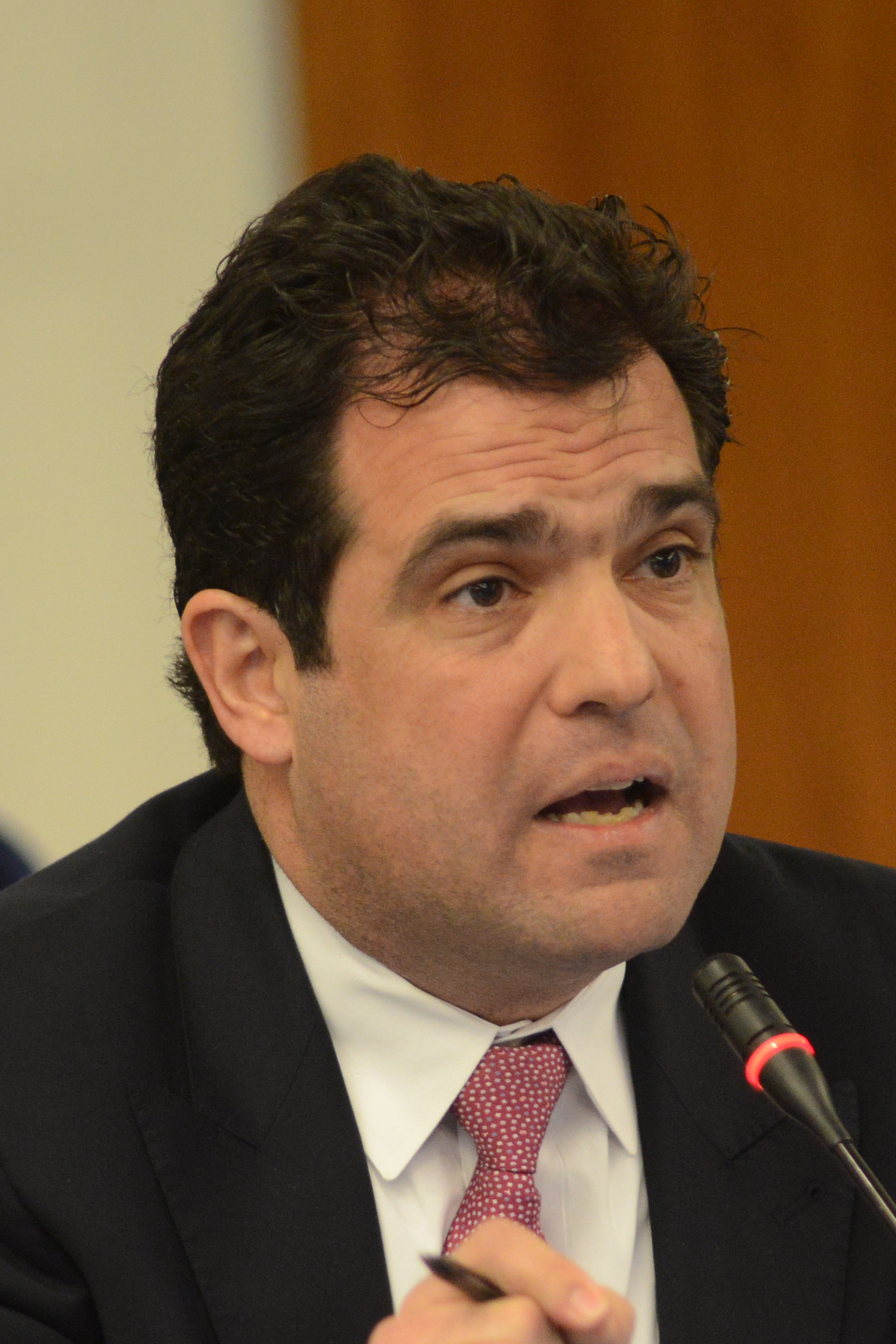
Alfredo Romero, director president

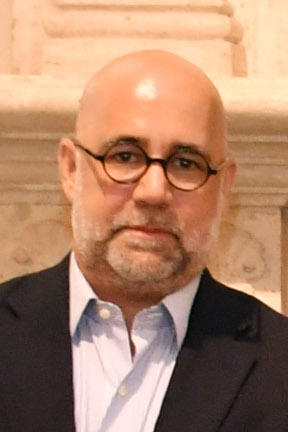
Gonzalo Himiob, director vice-president

Lawyers Alfredo Romero and Gonzalo Himiob founded the non-governmental organization Víctimas Venezolanas de Violaciones a los Derechos Humanos (VIVE) as a response to human rights violations that occurred after the Llaguno Overpass events in Caracas on 11 April 2002. Lawyers Carlos Bastidas Espinoza and Mónica Fernández, among others, founded the NGO Foro Penal Venezolano, and both organizations would later merge to create Foro Penal. The Penal Forum was the first organization to go to the newly founded International Criminal Court to denounce that crimes against humanity were being committed in Venezuela.

In 2008, the organization asked the Supreme Tribunal of Justice to nullify the Military Intelligence and Counterintelligence Law, popularly known as the Snitch Law, which established as compulsory for any person to comply with intelligence tasks if requested by the authorities.

During the student hunger strike in 2009, Foro Penal assumed the defense of that year's 47 political prisoners and requested the Inter-American Commission on Human Rights (IACHR) to "verify the situation of abuses and illegalities in the cases of those detained, prosecuted and persecuted for their political position". Alfredo Romero, spokesman for the organization, informed that Venezuela was the only Latin American country that refused to receive the IACHR along with Cuba. Foro Penal estimated that by that time 2,200 people had been charged for participating in protests, including 500 students.

Foro Penal estimated that between 4 February and 22 October 2014, there were 3383 arbitrary arrests related to protests in the country. The organization also denounced and documented torture during the protests, including beatings and electric shocks. By the end of April of that year it had documented 70 cases of abuse against detainees; Gonzalo Himiob stated that the abuses were continuous and systematic, and that the mistreatment of prisoners was very similar in all parts of the country. Due to the "meticulous" documentation of human rights violations committed during the 2014 protests and for showing them to the international community, the United States Department of State awarded its annual Human Rights Defender Award to Foro Penal. By this date the NGO had a national network of more than 200 pro bono lawyers and 1 000 human rights activists. Foro Penal has also represented Marvinia Jiménez, who was attacked by officers of the Bolivarian National Guard that year.

The NGO requested precautionary protection measures before the IACHR in favor of Lorent Saleh and Gerardo Carrero, imprisoned in the Bolivarian Intelligence Service's La Tumba, asking the organization to require the Venezuelan government to protect their life and personal integrity. The IACHR granted these measures on 2 March 2015.

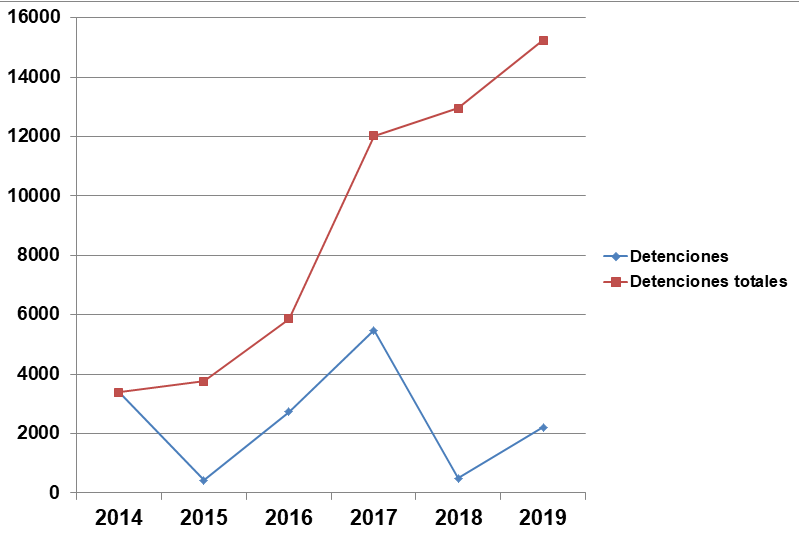
Arbitrary detentions in Venezuela between 2014 and 2019 according to Foro Penal. Arrests by year in blue and total arrests in red.

In 2017, Foro Penal published a joint report with Human Rights Watch documenting arbitrary detentions, torture, and excessive use of force during the 2017 Venezuelan protests. Between January 1 and October 31, the organization documented 5,511 arrests for political purposes, the highest number of detainees in a year. A report prepared by the organization along with the Robert F. Kennedy Center for Human Rights documented that 200 cases of enforced disappearances in 2018 increased to 524 in 2019, attributed to an increase in protests. The analysis concluded that the average disappearance lasted five days, suggesting that the government wanted to avoid the scrutiny that could come with large-scale, long-term detentions.

Among the political prisoners represented by Foro Penal are Alejandro Peña Esclusa, Lorent Saleh, Karen Palacios and Salvador Franco, among others. In 2018 Foro Penal released a documentary on the history of the organization, "Que se haga justicia. La historia del Foro Penal en Venezuela" (lit. 'Let Justice Be Done. The History of Foro Penal in Venezuela.').

By 2021, both Alfredo Romero and Gonzalo Himiob were accredited as counsel at the International Criminal Court.

== Recent activity ==
Prior to the government's official announcement, Foro Penal had already developed a technical draft for an Amnesty Law to establish the necessary legal framework for the release of political prisoners.. In January 2026, following a similar proposal by the National Executive led by Delcy Rodríguez, the organization reiterated its criteria, emphasizing the legal distinction between amnesty and pardon. Foro Penal's proposal demands the dismissal of charges and the total expungement of criminal records, while strictly excluding individuals responsible for crimes against humanity.

== Attacks ==
In 2008, Mónica Fernández suffered an attack in which she was shot in the back. Despite being shot very close to her spine she did not suffer major injuries.

Alfredo Romero has been criminalized several times by state officials and in media programs, particularly in Diosdado Cabello's Con El Mazo Dando, has received death threats, has been harassed in national airports and has denounced the intervention of Foro Penal's communications without a warrant. Romero has a cautelary protection measure issued by the Inter-American Commission of Human Rights in 17 March 2015.

During a 2017 interview by Spanish journalist Jordi Évole in the program Salvados, Nicolás Maduro accused Foro Penal of being financed by the United States, as well as other organizations such as Transparency International and Caritas, and of being "directed by delinquents".

== Awards ==
Foro Penal has been awarded several times both in Venezuela and abroad, including by the United States government in July 2015, the State Lawyers Association of Zulia in August 2015 and by the Barcelona Lawyers Association, Spain, in February 2016. The organization's director, Alfredo Romero, was awarded the Robert F. Kennedy Human Rights Award in 2017. The organization has been nominated for the Nobel Peace Prize in 2015, 2016 and 2019. In 2023, the organization was received the Defender of the Year Award from Civil Rights Defenders.

== See also ==
- Revolving door effect
- PROVEA
- Un Mundo Sin Mordaza
- Venezuelan Observatory of Social Conflict
- International Criminal Court investigation in Venezuela
