= Carlos Correa (activist) =

Venezuelan activist and journalist

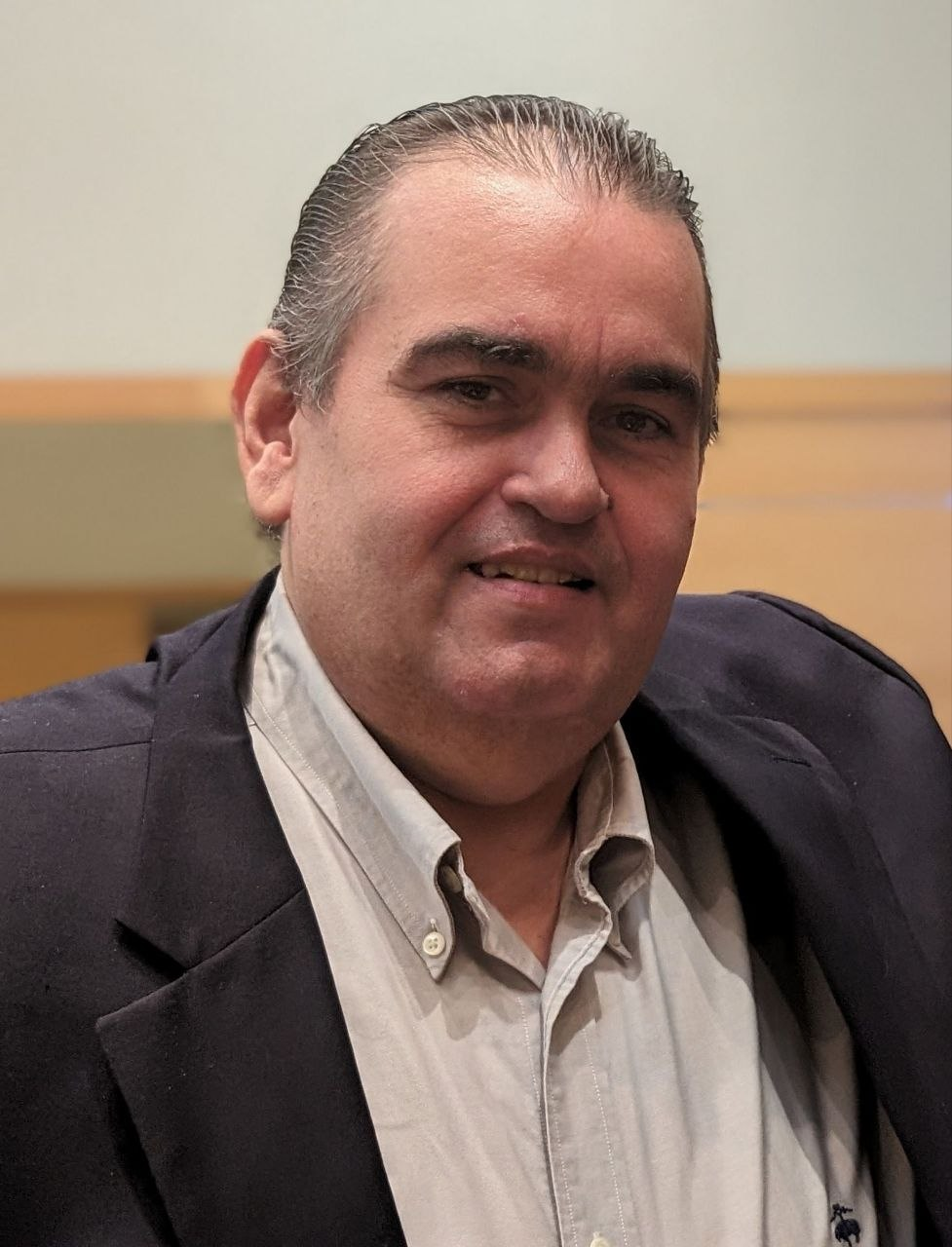
- Education: Universidad Católica Andrés Bello
- Occupations: Activist, journalist, university professor

Carlos Correa (born Puerto la Cruz, Venezuela) is a Venezuelan activist and director of the NGO Espacio Público.

== Early life ==
Correa says he learned to read newspapers before entering school because his father was an avid reader. From an early age, he developed interest in newspapers, magazines and literature. In high school, Carlos was an active leader in student government and in social work with children.

== Career ==
Correa moved to Caracas to study social communication at the Andrés Bello Catholic University. While at the university, Carlos began working with the Jesuit radio project Fe y Alegría, helping the largest network of public schools in poor areas of Venezuela. After thirteen years, he became the director of the Fe y Alegría network. During this time, he prepared community reporters, promoted community participation in the media and coordinated educational programs at the Fe y Alegría Radio Institute.

Between 2001 and 2006, he worked at PROVEA and became its general coordinator.

Correa then moved into journalism and became a university professor, but also remained in the public service space, serving as director of the NGO Espacio Público, which aims to promote and defend human rights, especially freedom of expression, the right to information and social responsibility in social media. As a result of his work, Correa has been victim to pressuring, harassment and threats. Espacio Público and Carlos Correa have participated annually in at least four international events, in addition to 30 hearings before the Inter-American Commission on Human Rights (IACHR).

== See also ==
- Gonzalo Himiob
- Liliana Ortega
- Rocío San Miguel
