= Marvinia Jiménez =

Venezuelan seamstress (born 1979)

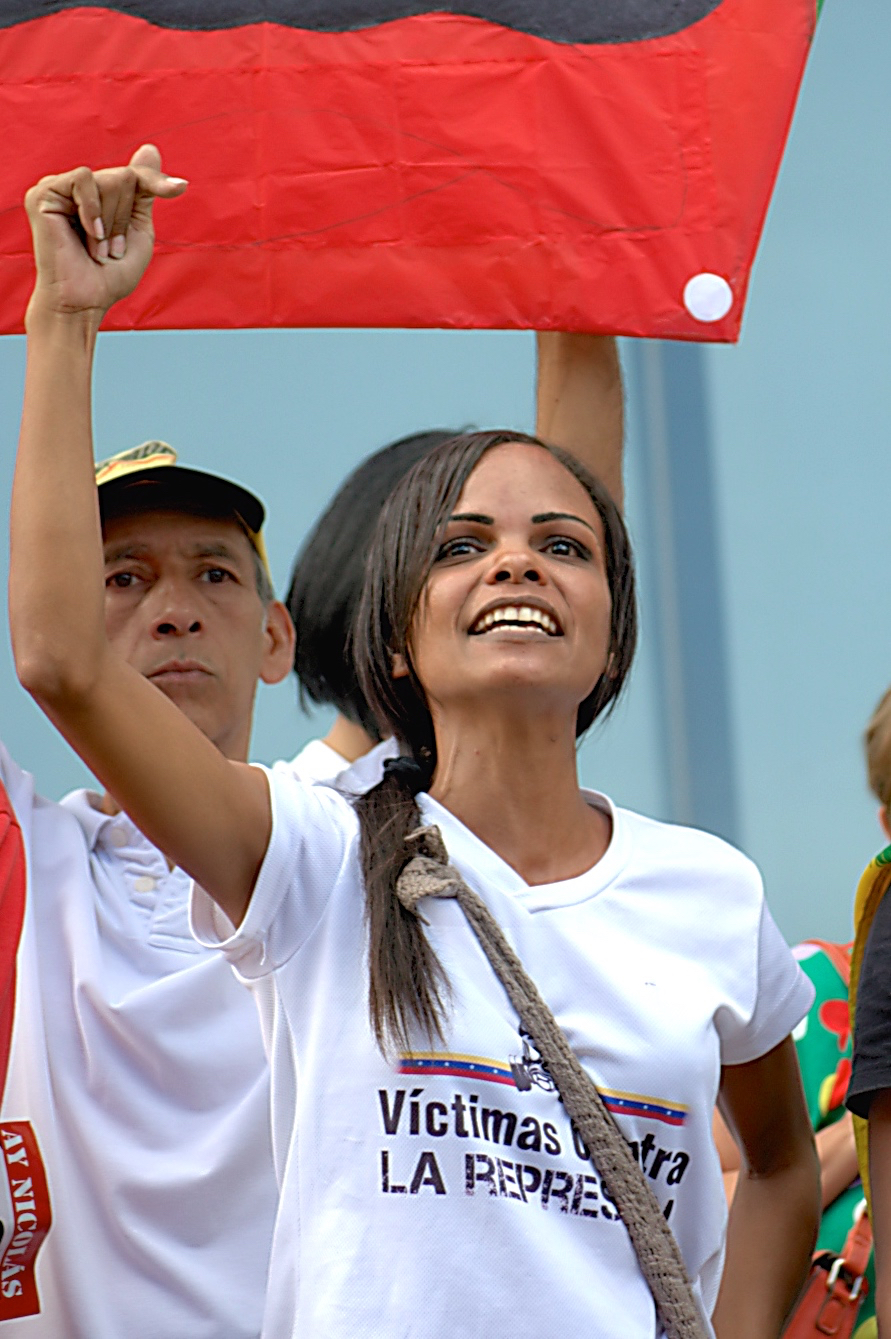
- Jiménez at a demonstration in December 2014.
- Born: 1979 (age 46–47)
- Monuments: r
- Occupations: Seamstress, Activism
- Organization: Committee of Victims Against Repression

Marvinia Jiménez (1979) is a Venezuelan seamstress who was abused by members of the Venezuelan National Guard during the 2014 Venezuelan protests. Following the incident, Jiménez became an activist, calling for changes to be performed by the Venezuelan government. She also became a target of violence by Venezuelan authorities due to the popularity of her case.

== 2014 Venezuelan protests ==
=== Beating incident ===
On 24 February 2014, Jiménez was traveling between her workshop and home when she came across members of the Venezuelan National Guard repressing a demonstration. Jiménez began to take photos of the event with her cell phone and was then confronted by members of the National Guard. A woman belonging to the National Guard, Josneidy Nayari Castillo, threw Jiménez to the ground, hit, kicked and beat her with a helmet, then had her transported to a government facility where she was supposedly abused further.

Following the incident, Jiménez was accused of resisting arrest, assaulting the officers, property damage, inciting disobedience and was ordered to report every 30 days. Josneidy Nayari Castillo, the woman of the National Guard who had assaulted Jiménez, was released from custody days later on 14 March and has not been prosecuted for any wrongdoing, later being promoted to lieutenant in the National Guard. Other officers involved in the incident have not been identified.

== 2017 Venezuelan protests ==
On 24 May 2017, Jiménez was showering in the morning when she heard clashes between the National Guard and protesters in her neighborhood in La Isabelica. National Guardsmen were firing tear gas and shotguns at protesters, attempting to disperse them when Jiménez shouted from her balcony to neighbors to begin recording their actions. The National Guardsmen recognized Jiménez and fired their shotguns at her, hitting her in the arm. After being hit by pellets, she still attempted to assist a man onto the roof who was fleeing repression, though she was shot once more and fell from the roof onto the garage, fracturing her leg. The National Guardsmen, thinking they had killed her, shouted "You got them!" and fled the scene, firing one last tear gas canister into her apartment where Jiménez's son was hiding. The man Jiménez had attempted to help was left laying in the parking lot, with shotgun pellets wounds inflicted upon his body.

Months later on 9 August 2017, SEBIN and CONAS agents raided the homes of her ex-husband and family, arresting them while searching for her.

== Activism ==
Following the beating incident, Jiménez began to speak at demonstrations against the government. Jiménez also became a member of the Committee of Victims Against Repression in Venezuela. On 24 June 2014, she spoke at a demonstration called the "March for Independence" in Altamira organized by the Movimiento Estudiantil, where individuals such as María Corina Machado, Freddy Guevara and many other Venezuelans gathered to demand the release of students who were arrested. At the gathering, she also called on Venezuelans to show a large number in protests so "national government authorities are aware of rejection felt by the population".

As situations continued to deteriorate in Venezuela and protest grew once more in 2017, Jiménez called for protests. She stated that she did not fear death because it is imminent, explaining that her greatest fear was that the Venezuelan people would stop protesting.

== See also ==
- Human rights in Venezuela
