= Liliana Ortega =

Venezuelan lawyer and professor (born 1965)

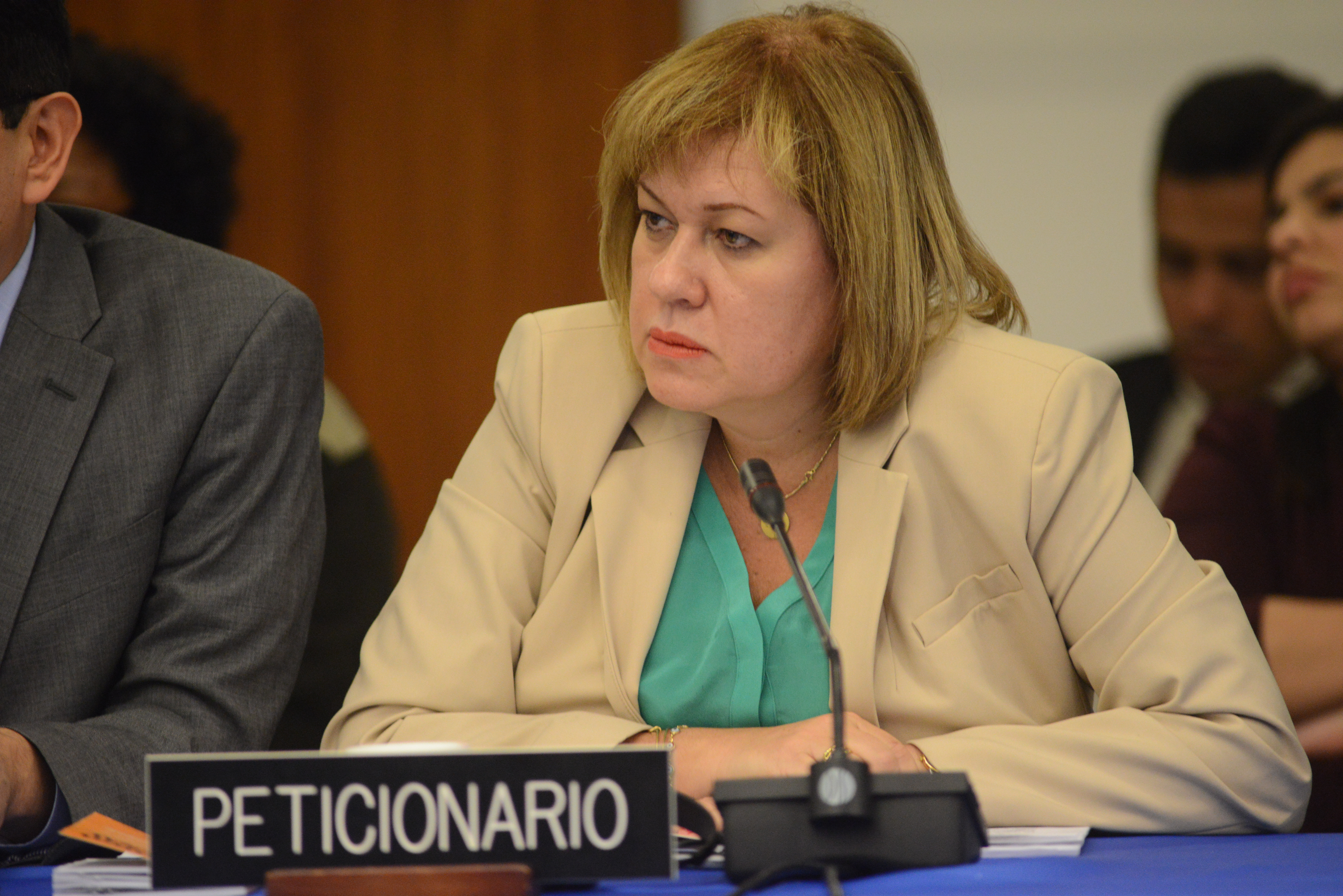
Liliana Ortega

Liliana Ortega Mendoza (born 1965) is a Venezuelan professor, and human rights lawyer and advocate. Her work as a human rights defender has earned her several awards, including the Ordre national du Mérite.

== Biography ==
Liliana Ortega Mendoza was born in Caracas in 1965. She is the founder and executive director of the Comité de Familiares de Víctimas del Caracazo (COFAVIC) ("Family Committee of Victims of Caracazo"). Cofavic is a non-governmental organization (NGO) that works for the protection and promotion of human rights, independent of any partisan and religious doctrine or institution; it is a non-profit civil association. Her work focuses on the victims associated with Caracazo. Ortega teaches law at Andrés Bello Catholic University.

== Awards and honors ==
- 2017, Franco-German Prize for Human Rights and the Rule of Law
- 2010, Officer, Ordre national du Mérite, granted by the Government of France
- 1999, named as one of the fifty Leaders for the New Millennium in Latin America by Time magazine
- 1999, ASHOKA fellow
- 1994, nominated for the Reebok Human Rights Award

== See also ==
- Gonzalo Himiob
- Carlos Correa
- Rocío San Miguel
