= Gonzalo Himiob =

Venezuelan lawyer, writer and human rights activist

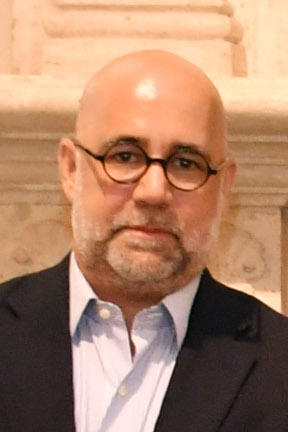
- Gonzalo Himiob
- Born: October 5, 1969 (age 56); Caracas, Venezuela
- Occupation: Lawyer

Gonzalo Himiob Santomé (born October 5, 1969) is a Venezuelan lawyer, writer and activist. He is a founding member of the non-governmental organization Foro Penal and is currently its vice-president.

== Biography ==
Gonzalo was born in Caracas, Venezuela. He graduated as a lawyer from the Universidad Católica Andrés Bello (UCAB) in 1992, specializing in criminal science at the UCAB in 1996 and at the Universidad Central de Venezuela (UCV) in 2011. He was a university professor at the UCAB from 1996 to 2016 and has been a professor at the UCV since 2000. Himiob was also founder of the legal office Himiob, Romero y Asociados, being coordinator of the criminal and criminology area since 1993, and since 2001 he is an associate researcher of the Legal Research Center of the UCAB.

Between 1999 and 2000 Gonzalo served as the coordinator of the civil association "Foro Constitucional de Venezuela", was a founding member of the non-governmental organization VIVE (Venezuelan Victims of Human Rights Violations) and is a founding member of the NGO Foro Penal, where he has served as national director since 2004.

Gonzalo has published several works, including political and legal essays and monographs, including The Government of Intolerance, a book that reviews the most emblematic cases of political persecution and discrimination during the government of Hugo Chávez; three collections of poetry: The Other Moons and the World, Chronicles of the Rhinoceros, the Lion and the Ostriches, and Nocturnatios; and his novels Absences Leave the Night and Feeling the Thirst.

Since 2014, Gonzalo Himiob has been singled out and criminalized on multiple occasions in the program Con el Mazo Dando de Diosdado Cabello, as well as in different public media and by official spokespersons. He has received threats against his physical and personal integrity because of his work as an activist.

In 2019, Gonzalo was awarded the Civil Courage Prize for his "strong resistance to evil, taking great personal risk".

In February 2020 Gonzalo was formally authorized as lawyer authorized to litigate before the International Criminal Court (ICC).

== Personal life ==
Gonzalo Himiob plays the bass.

== See also ==
- Carlos Correa
- Liliana Ortega
- Rocío San Miguel

== Acknowledgements ==
- Recognition by the Venezuelan Science Journalism Circle and the National Union of Press Workers. (July 1999)
- Recognition of Merit, Caracas Bar Association. (June 2009)
- Bicentennial Order, Caracas Bar Association. (July 2014)
- Exemplary Citizen, first and only class, Caracas Metropolitan Mayor's Office. (July 2014)
- IABA/FIA Lexis Nexis Award for the Defense of the Rule of Law in Latin America (June 2018)
- Civilian Courage Prize (2019)
