= Christine Chanet =

French lawyer and judge

- Born: February 23, 1944 (age 82); Paris, France
- Education: French National School for the Judiciary
- Occupations: Lawyer, judge
- Organisation: United Nations Human Rights Committee

Christine Chanet (born 23 February 1944 in Paris) is a French lawyer and judge who is a long-term member of the United Nations Human Rights Committee, serving as its chairperson in 1997-98 and 2005–06. She also sits on the UN Committee Against Torture.

== Early life and education ==
Chanet was born on 23 February 1944 in Paris, where she studied law. From 1968 to 1970 she studied at the French National School for the Judiciary.

== Career ==
=== Activities in France ===
Chanet has held positions in the French government, including Junior Magistrate at the Ecole Nationale de la Magistrature (1968); Magistrate at the Central Administration of the French Ministry of Justice (1970); Technical Adviser, and subsequently Special Assistant at the Secretariat of State for Women's Affairs (1974); Special Assistant at the Secretariat of State for Culture (1976); Special Assistant in the Legal Affairs Directorate at the French Ministry of External Relations (1981); Head of International Civil and Criminal Affairs and Human Rights Department at the French Ministry of Foreign Affairs (1983); Technical Adviser in the Office of the French Minister of Justice (1988); and Advocate-General at the Court of Appeal of Paris (1992-1996). She has been a Counsellor of the Court of Cassation of France since 1996, and is the Section President and Dean of the Criminal Division. She has also been a member of the French National Consultative Commission on Human Rights, and is a member of the French Society of International Rights and of the International Law Association.

=== UNHRC and other international activities ===
Chanet became a member of the United Nations Human Rights Committee in 1987 and chaired the committee 1997–1998 and 2005–2006. She is a member of the Committee Against Torture, has been the Personal Representative of the High Commissioner for Human Rights for examining the situation in Cuba, and belongs to the Working Group for the Application of the Bangalore Principles on Judicial Independence. She has chaired the committee in charge of reviewing criminal law decisions following the delivery of judgments of the European Court of Human Rights.

In 2000, Chanet criticized Canada for providing public financing to Catholic parochial education, but not to schools administered by other religions. “The position of the committee is that the state has to fulfill the covenant; it is the state that is in charge of implementing the covenant, not the provinces,” Chanet said. In 2001, she participated in the Round Table Conference held at the Peace Palace at The Hague at which the Bangalore Principles of Judicial Conduct were finalized. In the same year, she and then fellow Committee member P.N. Bhagwati visited Hong Kong, where they were asked to weigh in on proposed legislation for an anti-subversion law expected to be used against Falun Gong. Chanet and Bhagwati declined to meet with members of the persecuted religion.

In 2006, Chanet complained about the insufficient deference given to the UNHRC by the U.S. “You can't deny the role given to us by treaty," she maintained at a briefing, describing the U.S. as being “in a situation of isolation over its unilateral interpretation of international treaty law.”

In her capacity as chair of the UNHRC, Chanet participated at the March 2007 Vienna meeting of the Intergovernmental Group of Experts, convened at the request of ECOSOC, that examined and agreed upon the text of the Commentary on the Bangalore Principles. Since 2010, Chanet has been a member of the Judicial Integrity Group. At present she is serving a four-year term, ending on December 31, 2014, as Rapporteur on Follow-up to Concluding Observations.

In 2011, Chanet was appointed to head a commission tasked with carrying out the UNHRC's sixth probe of Israeli violations. UN Watch expressed concern that Chanet had accused Israel of “total discrimination,” and stated that “it is very difficult to have a real dialogue (with Israel).” In July 2012, Hillel Neuer of UN Watch reacted to the commission's report with disappointment: “The only victims it contemplates are Palestinians, the only perpetrator, Israel. In the guise of human rights, Syria and other oppressive regimes sponsored this UN inquiry to deflect attention from their own crimes, to scapegoat Israel and erode its international standing.”

=== Fact-Finding Mission on Israeli Settlements ===
Chanet also headed a UNHRC Fact-Finding Mission on Israeli Settlements, and claimed in a November 2012 statement that she considers the West Bank “Occupied Palestinian Territory.” UN Watch Executive Director Hillel Neuer complained that the UNHRC had “ordered five one-sided commissions of inquiry against Israel, yet created none for victims of mass killings in Iran, North Korea, China, Congo, Pakistan, Sri Lanka and many other repressive regimes.” In July 2012 the Anti-Defamation League publicly doubted “the impartiality of the three individuals chosen by the United Nations Human Rights Council (UNHRC) to head up its fact-finding mission tasked with investigating Israeli settlements,” noting that Chanet had “strongly criticized Israel's actions in the West Bank and Gaza.” By contrast, Al-Haq described Chanet's mission as an “important step towards thoroughly investigating Israel’s violations of the rights of the Palestinian people.”

On January 31, 2013, the Fact-Finding Mission issued its preliminary findings, concluding that Israel's “creeping annexation” of territory violated Palestinian human rights. The Israeli Foreign Ministry responded to the report by accusing the UNHRC of systematic anti-Israel bias, while Chanet, at a news conference, held up the report as “a kind of weapon for the Palestinians” to be used against Israel at the International Criminal Court. In the view of NGO Monitor, “Chanet has formed pre-existing prejudicial opinions on areas directly covered by the Mission mandate.”

== Personal life ==
Chanet is fluent in French and English.
