= Independent International Fact-Finding Mission on Venezuela =

Organization observing the human rights situation under the Bolivarian Revolution

Fact-Finging Mission on Venezuela 2026: Sofia Macher, Alex Neve and Maria Eloisa Quintero

The International Independent Fact-Finding Mission on the Bolivarian Republic of Venezuela is an observation body established in 2019 to study the human rights situation under the Bolivarian Revolution.

== Background ==
Since the establishment of Chavismo as the dominant political movement in Venezuela in the late 1990s, community-based social groups known as "colectivos" emerged in support of the United Socialist Party of Venezuela (PSUV), the governments of former president Hugo Chávez, and currently Nicolás Maduro. These groups claim to be dedicated to the promotion of democracy, political groups, and cultural activities; however, most of them act as paramilitary groups defending Chavismo.

This negative behaviour has intensified since the beginning of Nicolás Maduro's presidency in 2013. Since then, opposition groups to Chavismo have documented and denounced acts of intimidation and even criminal activity by these colectivos with state support, which frequently intervene in opposition marches to attack demonstrators, leading to tragic consequences.

As he was nearing the end of his constitutional term in 2018, Nicolás Maduro publicly called on several occasions for supporters to be prepared for combat in the event of a coup d'état against him or a foreign military intervention, further fuelling the negative attitude of these groups.

The colectivos have not been the only groups instilling fear among the civilian population. Since the beginning of Nicolás Maduro's presidency in 2013, state security forces have also been used as instruments of intimidation against civilians. In most opposition protests against Maduro, intervention by state security forces has resulted in high numbers of injuries and deaths, without the responsible authorities punishing those responsible.

The Special Action Forces (FAES), in violation of the law but with state support, carry out operations in poor sectors of the country supposedly to combat crime, but involving extrajudicial executions against unarmed civilians. The Venezuelan state itself has de facto criminalised protest. A frequent practice is accusing any demonstrator of treason; in detriment to their constitutional rights, they are tried in military courts, even though these courts exist only to prosecute military personnel, not civilians.

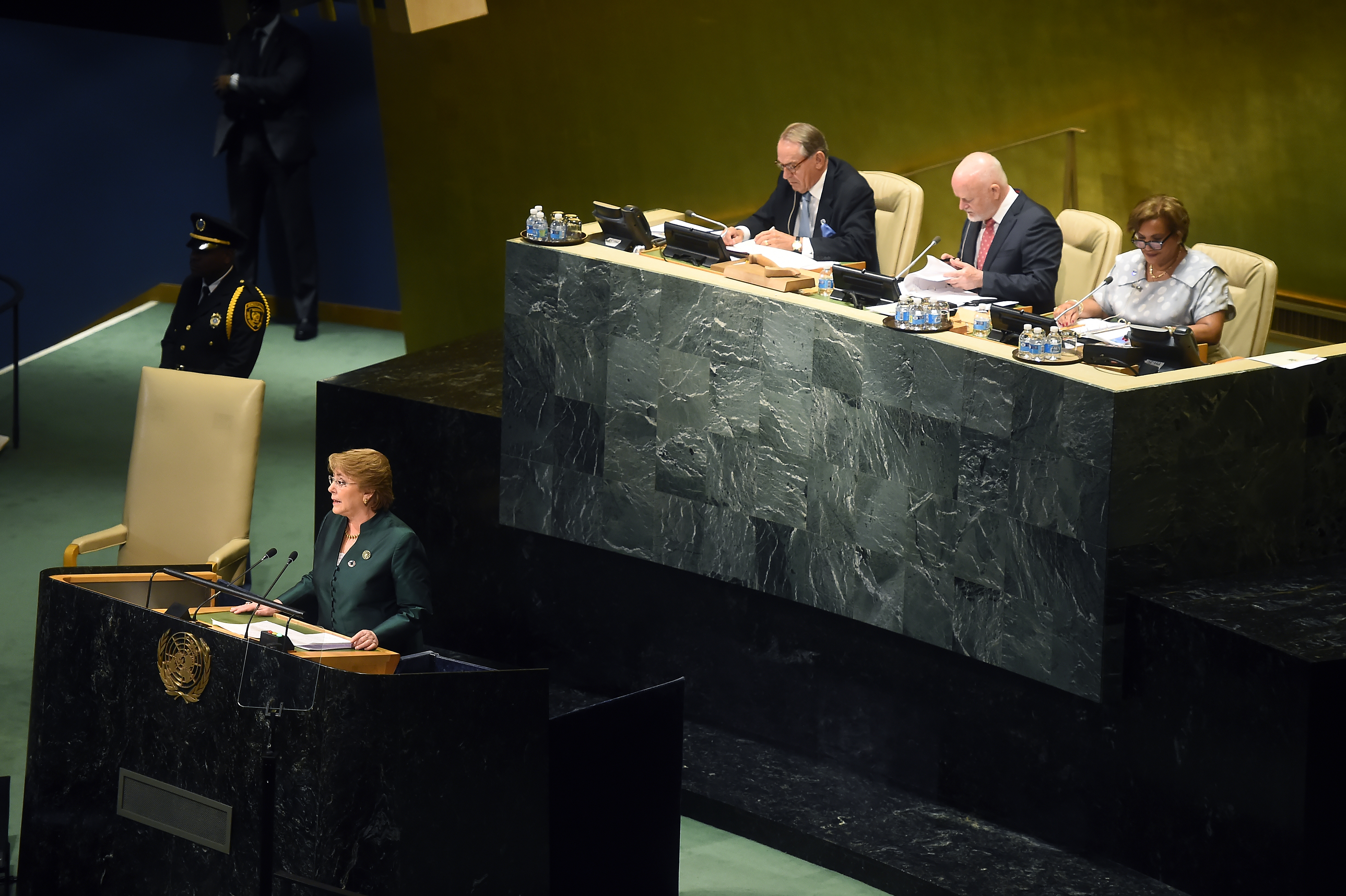
Michelle Bachelet as High Commissioner visited Venezuela in 2019 and declared that there were cases of torture and extrajudicial executions in Venezuela.

The Office of the United Nations High Commissioner for Human Rights (OHCHR) published a report in 2018 documenting how state security forces used arbitrary detentions as a mechanism to intimidate dissidents of the government of Nicolás Maduro. The report also denounced that detainees were frequently subjected to torture and cruel treatment. It further exposed cases in which members of the security forces, allegedly responsible for the extrajudicial execution of demonstrators, were released despite being subject to judicial arrest warrants or remained merely confined to police stations or military barracks where they could move freely and were not treated as detainees. Later in 2019, Michelle Bachelet, United Nations High Commissioner for Human Rights, presented her oral report in which she denounced criminal acts committed by pro-government armed colectivos, also highlighting the extrajudicial executions committed by the FAES and the explicit refusal of the Public Prosecutor's Office to initiate investigations into these acts.

The opposition has also denounced that Iris Varela, minister for the Penitentiary Service, released prisoners on several occasions to attack participants in various opposition marches. The trend among the upper ranks of Chavismo is the spread of hatred against the Venezuelan opposition, which is viewed not as a political adversary but as an enemy that must be eradicated. For example, Diosdado Cabello, through his programme Con el mazo dando, broadcast on the state-owned channel Venezolana de Televisión (VTV), publicly accuses various opposition figures of different crimes even without presenting evidence for his accusations. Even Nicolás Maduro himself threatened in 2018 to carry out extrajudicial executions against any opposition figure he considered a "terrorist", in reference to the killing of former officer Óscar Alberto Pérez by state security forces.

== Creation ==
The Mission's mandate was created on 27 September 2019 by United Nations Human Rights Council Resolution 42/25 to assess human rights violations since 2014: including persecution of opposition groups, immigration, food crisis, state sexism towards Venezuelan women and girls, among others; since the beginning of the first government of Nicolás Maduro of the United Socialist Party of Venezuela. The Office of the United Nations High Commissioner for Human Rights led by Michelle Bachelet reported the following in its 2019 report:

The report, which was prepared at the request of the UN Human Rights Council, states that over the past decade – and especially since 2016 –the Venezuelan government and its institutions have implemented a strategy "aimed at neutralising, repressing and criminalising the political opposition and those who criticise the government". A set of laws, policies and practices that has reduced the democratic sphere, dismantled the system of institutional control over the executive branch and allowed the reiteration of serious human rights violations. The document highlights the impact of the deep economic crisis, which has deprived the population of the means to satisfy their fundamental rights to food and medical care, among others.

— Report of the United Nations Human Rights Office on Venezuela urges immediate steps to stop and remedy grave rights violations.

In the context of the presidential crisis of Venezuela, Juan Guaidó said that "the Report of the UN puts to Maduro to level of the atrocious crimes committed by [Muammar] Gaddafi", whereas Maduro disqualified the report "for being plagued with falsehoods".

== Structure ==
The mission is hierarchical among the members of the United Nations:

- Marta Valiñas (chair)
- Francisco Cox Vial
- Paul Seils

The mission does not operate in the country since the Maduro government has refused it permission.

The only reason we have not conducted on-site research activities in Venezuela was because the Government of Venezuela did not want us to and did not allow us to do so. I have sent six communications to the Venezuelan government between January and September this year and have not received any response. In these communications I requested not only a visit to the country, but also meetings with authorities inside or outside the country. I also requested official data and information on the cases we were investigating. We also offered to send our report to the government for their comments before publishing it. I received no response. We deeply regret that this was the route chosen by the government.

— Address by Marta Valiñas, Chairperson of the Independent International Fact-Finding Mission on the Bolivarian Republic of Venezuela, to the 45th session of the Human Rights Council.

== Reports ==
=== First report (2020) ===
On 17 September 2020 the International Mission published a 443-page report and conducted more than 250 interviews with victims, accusing Nicolás Maduro, Interior Minister Néstor Reverol, Defence Minister Vladimir Padrino López, intelligence service chiefs, together with 45 other Venezuelan government officials, of crimes against humanity, describing extrajudicial killings, enforced disappearances, arbitrary detentions, torture and cruel treatment committed in Venezuela since 2014. On 5 October, the UN Human Rights Council approved a resolution extending the Mission's mandate for two more years.

=== Second report (2021) ===
The Mission's second report was published on 16 September 2021 and documented the role of the Venezuelan judicial system in the commission of human rights violations.

=== Third and fourth reports (2022) ===
The Mission delivered its third report on 26 September 2022, based on 246 confidential interviews. The UN Human Rights Council renewed the International Mission's mandate for another two years. The Mission also published a report the same day documenting human rights violations in the Orinoco Mining Arc, arbitrary deprivation of life, disappearances, extortion, corporal punishment, and sexual and gender-based violence. On 7 October the Human Rights Council again renewed the Mission's mandate for another two years.

On 7 October 2022, the Human Rights Council adopted a resolution extending the mandate of the Independent International Mission for two years. The resolution also extended the mandate of the Office of the High Commissioner for Human Rights, which has a presence in Caracas. It was jointly sponsored by around 50 countries and approved with 19 votes in favour, 5 against, and 23 abstentions. The Venezuelan government rejected the third report presented on 26 September.

=== Fifth and sixth reports (2023) ===
On 20 September 2023, the Mission published its fifth report, detailing the intensification of human rights violations. In February 2024, Maduro's government ordered the suspension of the Office of the High Commissioner for Human Rights in Venezuela, ordering the expulsion within 72 hours of 13 officials operating in Caracas, considering that the institution had "instrumentalised" its work against the government. This occurred after Michael Fakhri, UN Special Rapporteur on the right to food, stated that the government prevented him from visiting detention centres and constantly altered his agenda during his two-week visit to Venezuela. In relation to its criticism of the detention of human rights activist Rocío San Miguel, Maduro accused the organisation of becoming "the private law firm" of a "group of coup plotters and terrorists". The office had been installed in 2019 when Michelle Bachelet held the position. On 21 March 2024, president Marta Valiñas presented an oral report concluding that the government continued committing serious human rights violations.

=== Seventh report (2024) ===
On 17 September 2024, the Mission presented a report on the post-electoral events of July, stating that the Venezuelan authorities had consciously and deliberately carried out actions to dismantle and demobilise the opposition. Valiñas stated: "We are witnessing an intensification of the state's repressive apparatus in response to what it perceives as criticism, opposition, or dissent." The Mission obtained information on the detention of 158 minors (130 boys and 28 girls), in protests where 25 people died and for which Maduro's government blamed the opposition. It confirmed that 24 of the 25 deaths were caused by gunshot wounds, most of them to the neck. It described the operation known as "Tun Tun" carried out in neighbourhoods, as well as stating that "The torture methods used in the investigated cases included punches; beatings with wooden planks or foam-wrapped bats; and electric shocks, including to the genitals." Finally, the Mission stated that "The main public powers abandoned all appearance of independence and openly submitted to the Executive." Patricia Tappatá read part of the report: "The torture methods used in the investigated cases included punches; beatings with wooden planks or foam-wrapped bats; and electric shocks, including to the genitals. Other recorded methods included suffocation with plastic bags, immersion in cold water, and sleep deprivation through lighting and/or loud music 24 hours a day." On 2 December, during his visit to Caracas, International Criminal Court prosecutor Karim Khan asked the Venezuelan authorities to allow the reactivation of the technical office of the High Commissioner in the country, which they had previously promised in writing. The following day the Venezuelan government stated that the reactivation had taken place in November.

On 18 March 2025, the Mission determined in an update that Venezuela continued the arbitrary detention of opposition members, or those perceived as such, including members of the political opposition, human rights defenders, and journalists. During the presentation, Marta Valiñas, president of the Mission, stated: "This is the same pattern of conduct that the Mission has previously characterised as crimes against humanity." Francisco Cox detailed that at least 150 foreign nationals had been accused of participating in conspiracies against the government, adding: "Diplomatic efforts to communicate with detainees are ignored by Nicolás Maduro's government, contrary to international law." Patricia Tappatá denounced one of the post-electoral protests of July 2024 in Aragua state, in which seven people died.

=== Eighth report (2025) ===
In September 2025, the Mission presented its eighth report covering the period between September 2024 and August 2025. The report argued that the government's repression following the presidential elections represented the continuation of a plan aimed at suppressing the opposition or those perceived as such. It referred to arbitrary detentions of adults and adolescents, sexual violence, torture, cruel, inhuman, or degrading treatment, delays in court appearances, coercion, extortion, forced disappearances, and deaths. The Mission recorded 220 detentions of minors: 187 boys, 22 girls, and 11 persons whose gender could not be determined. It also recorded 25 deaths during the post-electoral period, documenting five deaths in custody and three deaths related to state negligence and lack of medical attention under the pretext of alleged protests.

In October, the United Nations Human Rights Council adopted a resolution extending the mandate of the Independent International Fact-Finding Mission on Venezuela for two years until 2026. The resolution also requested that the Mission investigate the repression following the July 2024 presidential elections, including violence by pro-government armed groups known as "colectivos". Human Rights Watch received credible reports of 23 killings of demonstrators and passers-by, and identified evidence linking security forces and colectivos to several of these killings. Human Rights Watch stated that the European Union and the United States government should continue using their influence, including targeted sanctions, to pressure Maduro's government.

== See also ==
- Human rights in Venezuela
- Enforced disappearances in Venezuela
- Torture in Venezuela
- International sanctions during the Venezuela crisis
- International Criminal Court investigation in Venezuela
- International Fact-Finding Mission on Israeli Settlements
- UN fact-finding mission on Iran
