= Shaheen Sardar Ali =

British Pakistani law professor and an author

Shaheen Sardar Ali is a British Pakistani law professor and an author who formerly served as chair of the National Commission on the Status of Women of Pakistan. She is a professor of law at the University of Warwick.

== Biography ==
Shaheen, a Pashtun, was born in Swat in 1955 in Pakistan and obtained her BA, LLB and an MA in Political Science from the University of Peshawar. A Foreign and Commonwealth Scholarship allowed her to come to the UK in 1990 to take an LLM in international law at Hull University. She returned to Pakistan and gained a professorship at Peshawar University in 1995. Three years later, she returned to the United Kingdom, teaching as a law lecturer at the University of Warwick. Her research and teaching interests include international law of human rights, women's and children's rights and Islamic law and jurisprudence.

Ali is fluent in Urdu, Pashtu and Punjabi, can read and write Arabic and has a working knowledge of Persian. Furthermore, she serves as a consultant for the British Council, the World Bank, UNIFEM, ILO, NORAD and Radda Barnen and is a member of the British Council Task Force on Gender and Development. Ali often contributes to radio and television programmes and appears as commentator on current affairs and debates.

She was previously a member and vice-chair of the Office of the United Nations High Commissioner for Human Rights (OHCHR) working group on arbitrary detention.

She is married to Ali and the mother of two daughters, Gulsanga and Zara, and one son, Isfandyar.

== Works ==
- Gender and Human Rights in Islam and International Law: Equal Before Allah, Unequal Before Man? (2000) ISBN 90-411-1268-5
- Development Processes: Some experiences from the North West Frontier of Pakistan (2002)
- Indigenous Peoples and Ethnic Minorities of Pakistan: Constitutional and Legal Perspectives (2013) ISBN 9781136778681
