= Rocío San Miguel =

Venezuelan lawyer and activist (born 1966)

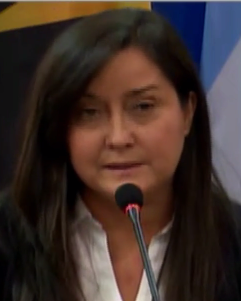
- San Miguel in 2017
- Born: Rocío San Miguel Sosa; 6 May 1966 (age 60); Caracas, Venezuela
- Occupations: Lawyer, activist

Rocío San Miguel Sosa (born 6 May 1966) is a lawyer and human rights activist, specialising in military issues. She is also the president of the NGO Control Ciudadano, a civil association whose objective is the supervision of citizens in terms of national security, defense, and the armed forces. She also supervises the commitments that the Venezuelan state has to the Rome Statute and the Inter-American Human Rights Commission.

On 9 February 2024, she was detained by Venezuelan security officials. After being held incommunicado for ten days and without her whereabouts being known, it was learned that she was being held in El Helicoide. Human rights organizations, including Amnesty International, have rejected the detention, described it as a enforced disappearance, and demanded her immediate release, recalling that she has a precautionary measure of protection from the Inter-American Commission on Human Rights.

She was released on 8 January 2026, after the 2026 United States strikes in Venezuela and capture of Nicolás Maduro.

== Career ==
Rocío San Miguel is also the president of the NGO Control Ciudadano, a civil association whose objective is the supervision of citizens in terms of national security, defense, and the armed forces. She also supervises the commitments that the Venezuelan state has to the Rome Statute and the Inter-American Commission on Human Rights.

== Harassment and defamation ==
Rocío San Miguel has suffered from constant harassment from groups hired by the Venezuelan government and from anonymous people, as well as from defamation through various methods on television, radio, and in print. On 18 January 2012, the Inter-American Commission of Human Rights issued cautionary methods of protection for San Miguel and her daughter.

Months later, on 29 June 2012, the Bolivarian Intelligence Service (SEBIN) broke into the house of her brother, José Manuel San Miguel. On 25 March 2014, president Nicolás Maduro made defamatory statements in a national broadcast against San Miguel, and accused her of being involved in an attempted coup. A few days before, on 18 March 2014, a stranger approached her while she was in her vehicle and threatened her repeatedly. On 2 May 2014, the then-Minister for Interior and Justice, Miguel Rodríguez Torres, accused San Miguel of being a spy. San Miguel has also been repeatedly attacked by Diosdado Cabello on his television show Con el Mazo Dando.

== Arrest ==
On 9 February 2024 she was detained by Venezuelan security officials, at the Simón Bolívar International Airport in Maiquetía, along with her daughter. The same day her father, her two brothers and another relative also were arrested. After being held incommunicado for ten days and without her whereabouts being known, her daughter was able to visit her in El Helicoide.

Human rights organizations, such as Amnesty International, PROVEA and the Women's Broad Front, have rejected the detention, described it as a enforced disappearance and demanding her immediate release. Amnesty International specifically the precautionary measure of protection issued in her favor by the Inter-American Commission on Human Rights.

On the aftermath of the 2026 United States strikes in Venezuela and capture of Nicolás Maduro, San Miguel was released on the 8 January 2026. The president of the National Assembly of Venezuela Jorge Rodríguez announced the liberation of a large number of prisoners. Rocío San Miguel was one of the first to be released.

== See also ==
- Alfredo Romero
- Gonzalo Himiob
- Carlos Correa
- Liliana Ortega
- Political prisoners in Venezuela
- Enforced disappearances in Venezuela
