= Orlando Figuera =

Young Venezuelan killed in 2017

- Born: 1996
- Died: 4 June 2017 (aged 20–21); Domingo Luciani Hospital, Caracas, Venezuela
- Cause of death: Skin infection

Orlando Figuera Esparragoza (1996 – 4 June 2017) was a young Venezuelan attacked during the 2017 protests in the country. Before his death, Orlando blamed the attack on a group of people who were feuding with him for work-related reasons: "Malandrín"; "Pecas"; "Menor"; "Oriental" and "Mono". The day after Orlando Figuera's death, Attorney General Luisa Ortega Díaz denied that Figuera was the victim of a hate crime or attacked for being a Chavista, as alleged by the government version. As of 2022, no person has been tried for Figuera's murder.

== Death ==
According to investigations conducted by the Venezuelan Public Ministry's Office, on May 20, 2017, in the Altamira urbanization of the Chacao municipality of Caracas, Orlando Figuera, 22 years old, found himself in a protest scene with a subject with whom he had previously had an altercation over a job vacancy in Parque Miranda, who upon seeing him assaulted him with a melee weapon and began shouting at the crowd and accusing him of stealing so that he was assaulted.

According to information provided by the Attorney General's Office in the Balance of victims killed and injured during demonstrations in April-June 2017:

(...) he encountered a subject with whom he had had a previous altercation and who had injured him with a knife over a work place in Parque Miranda. Upon seeing him, the man immediately assaulted him with a knife causing him a wound and began to shout to the demonstrators who were nearby "this one was stealing" so that the crowd attacked him physically and verbally. At that moment he received several stab wounds, one person sprayed gasoline on him and set him on fire.

Subsequently, Figuera was assisted by members of Salud Chacao and taken to the Domingo Luciani Hospital in El Llanito, where authorities took Orlando's statement. Figuera was admitted to the hospital with first and second degree burns in 80% of his body, as well as with several stab wounds.

In his testimony, Orlando blamed the attack on a group of people, nicknamed "Malandrín"; "Pecas"; "Menor"; "Oriental"; "Mono", whom he knew from work and who antagonized him for work related reasons; and Keylis Alexander Sierra, who is indicated as the material author of setting fire to Figuera. Figuera also stated that he was stabbed by "Malandrin" and described the protagonists as "a black guy, another blond, an Asian, a kid...". Attorney General Luisa Ortega Díaz, who headed the Public Prosecutor's Office and had been ratified for a second term by the pro-government National Assembly, stated on June 1 that the alleged perpetrators of the lynching had been identified and requested the State to provide the victim with the corresponding medical attention due to his delicate health condition.

Orlando's mother, Inés Esparragoza, affirmed that in spite of receiving a lot of help from the government, the doctors at Domingo Luciani did not take good care of her son, saying that "My son was never treated" and that "of the 15 days he was hospitalized, they cleaned his burns only one day, and it was the day before his death, he already smelled bad". Orlando Figuera died in the intensive care unit in the early morning of June 4, fourteen days after being attacked. Esparragoza was told contradictory versions of his death: One hospital doctor told him that his son had been intubated because he had suffered a stroke, while another later told him that Figuera had suffered a respiratory arrest. Esparragoza has declared that "When they took me to see my son's corpse, he was not intubated" and that "he was as if asleep, he looked like a monster and was full of blood everywhere". According to the pathologist of the Bello Monte Morgue, Orlando died of a skin infection.

The day after Orlando Figuera's death, Luisa Ortega Díaz denied that Figuera was the victim of a hate crime or attacked for being a Chavista, as alleged by the government version. Opposition deputy to the National Assembly, Juan Andrés Mejía, rejected the acts of violence and regretted Figuera's death. Days later, Chacao councilman Diego Scharifker declared to Globovisión that the young man was not attacked for being a Chavista, but because he was accused of stealing and argued that neither the attackers nor the victim were part of the protest taking place in the place. Inés Esparragoza rejected the theory that her son had been stealing. The government narrative assured that a mob of angry demonstrators attacked him confusing him with a person affiliated with the government and pointing him out as an "infiltrator". The official state communication system prepared videos on the case and Figuera's parents were interviewed by the Minister of Communication himself, Ernesto Villegas. Villegas alleged that the motive for the attack was Figuera's political leanings. President Nicolás Maduro alleged that Figuera was attacked because of his race and social condition.

On June 6, the Public Prosecutor's Office rejected again the government's version, reiterating that Figuera was not attacked for being a Chavista. According to the investigations headed by the 48th prosecutor of the Metropolitan Area of Caracas, Dixon Zerpa, Figuera had an altercation with an enemy who stabbed him and made the people present believe he was stealing so they would attack him.

== Investigations ==
On 20 June 2017, state-run Venezolana de Televisión television channel reported that the Bolivarian Intelligence Service (SEBIN) had identified Enzo Franchini Oliveros, 32 years old, as the alleged material author of the attack on Figuera after breaking into his residence in Caracas. Neither the Public Prosecutor's Office nor the Scientific, Criminal and Criminalistic Investigations Corps (CICPC) had mentioned Oliveros' name. On 5 August, the National Constituent Assembly, controlled by the ruling party, removed Luisa Ortega Díaz as Venezuela's attorney general and appointed Tarek William Saab as her replacement on the same day. The profiles and professions offered by Orlando Figuera to the Public Prosecutor's Office before his death did not match to that of Enzo and his white helmet when he was present at the protest, and Figuera does not hold Enzo responsible for the attack in his testimony.

Enzo later stated that he actively participated in the opposition marches, that he was dedicated to helping the injured in the demonstrations and picking them up with his motorcycle to remove them from the tear gas or in case they needed any urgent intervention. On 20 May 2017, he went to see what was happening in the brawl in Altamira and tried to prevent the attack on Orlando. Enzo managed to leave the country before the SEBIN could arrest him, and after residing for a time in the United States, Franchini moves to Valencia, Spain, and later Madrid. His mother, Elena, argues that if he had really done something wrong "he would have decided to go to Italy, as its constitution prohibits the extradition of its nationals", and has stated that for at least two years the Maduro regime has accused and criminalized Franchini in social networks and on television programs, using labels such as "right-wing hitman", "member of the Ku Klux Klan", "Odebrecht corrupt " and "terrorist". On 31 May 2019, Tarek William Saab requested an arrest warrant with inclusion to the Interpol red alert system against the alleged person responsible for Figuera's death, and on 10 July Enzo was arrested in Getafe, Madrid, after renewing his driver's license and after being requested by Venezuela. The National Court of Spain (Audiencia Nacional) ordered Enzo's imprisonment and he was transferred to Soto del Real prison. Saab declared that he would be charged with "public instigation, terrorism and aggravated intentional homicide". Enzo's mother denounced that in Venezuela they had been "subjected to a terrible campaign of slander and harassment. Threats if we do not collaborate with them. My daughter spent 48 hours in El Helicoide and my husband, who is still there, is visited from time to time".

Venezuela issued an extradition request for Enzo, which was rejected by the Audiencia Nacional. The judge in charge, Pedraz, demanded the Venezuelan judicial authorities on 6 September 2019 to resend the extraditional documentation, which was illegible, but it was never resent. Tarek William Saab qualified the information published by the Spanish newspaper La Razón as "fake news". Enzo was granted parole by the National Court on 4 November. According to prosecutor Marcelo Azcarraga, the documentation sent to Spain does not describe any criminal activity of the defendant, only that Enzo was present in the place and at the time of the event, as well as other people, without describing "direct participatory behavior", and that in Spain with an indictment with such description of the facts, the sentence would have to be acquittal. His pro bono defense attorney, Ismael Oliver, pointed out that Orlando Figuera's statement to the Venezuelan Public Prosecutor's Office identifies those responsible for the attack: "El Malandrín", "El Pecas", "El Menor", "El Oriental" and "El Mono" and Keylis Alexander Sierra, who is indicated as the material author of setting fire to Figuera, and questioned that a claim was made "against a person who is proven, duly accredited, that he did not participate nor was involved in these events". Oliver also indicated that the documentation sent was illegible, argued that little readable text distanced Enzo from the events, and recalled both the human rights situation in Venezuela and what would happen to any person who was handed over to Venezuela.

On 5 June 2020, the Criminal Chamber Section 1 of the Audiencia Nacional agreed to Franchini's extradition, considering that all the requirements to proceed were met, a decision appealed by both the prosecution and the defense, but revoked the decision on 30 September due to fears that his fundamental rights would be violated.

== See also ==
- Timeline of the 2017 Venezuelan protests
- Killing of Jairo Ortiz
- Killing of Paola Ramírez
- Juan Pablo Pernalete
- Killing of Armando Cañizales
- Killing of Miguel Castillo
- Killing of Paúl Moreno
- Neomar Lander
- Killing of Fabián Urbina
- Killing of David Vallenilla
- Killing of Xiomara Scott
