= Violence against women in Venezuela =

Public health issue of violent acts against women

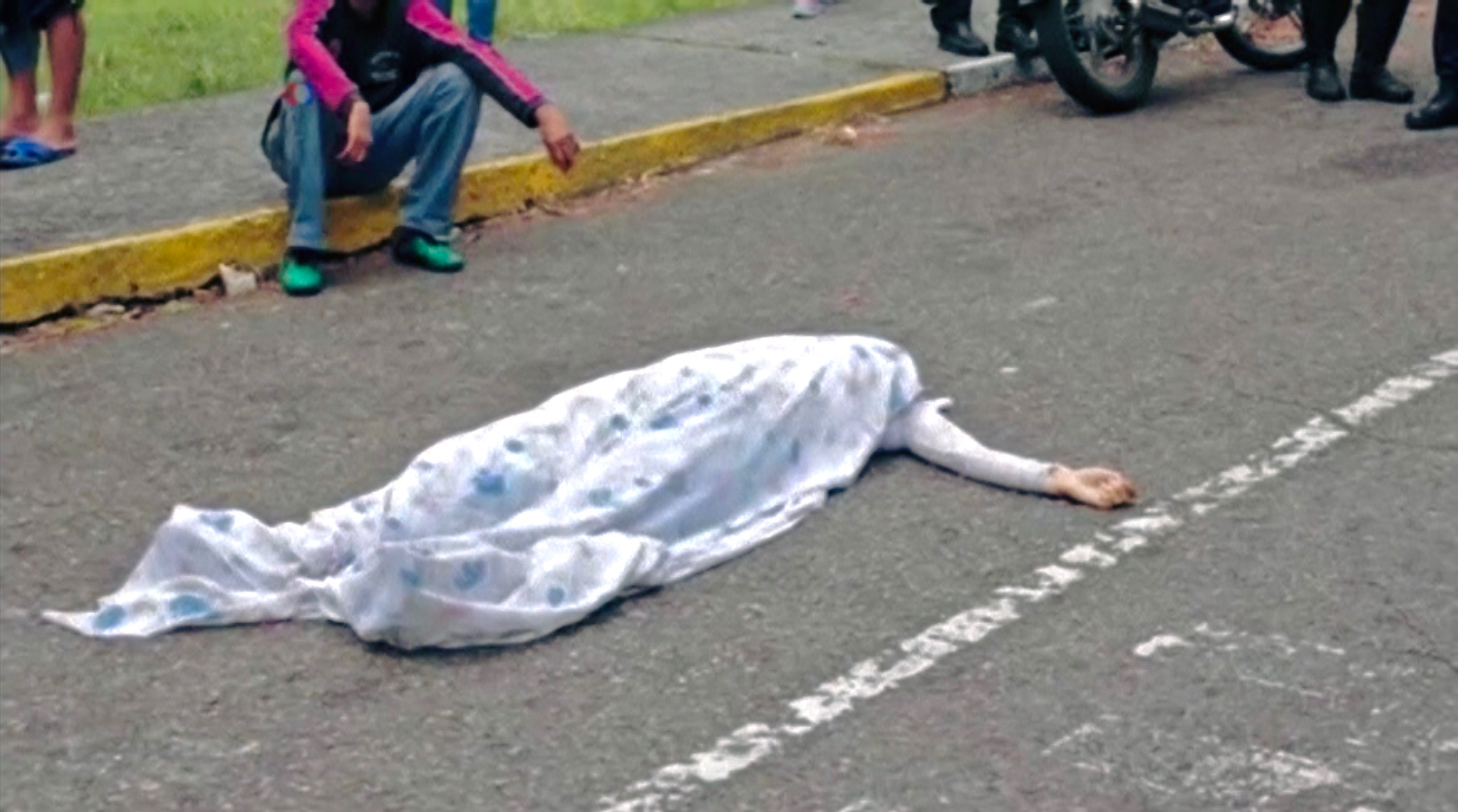
Paola Ramírez, a female student killed during the 2017 Venezuelan protests

Violence against women in Venezuela occurs in Venezuela. With corruption and the crisis in Venezuela, offenders are not being prosecuted. In 2014, only 0.7% of the official complaints of violence towards women resulted in trials. There is a United Nations database on Violence against women in Venezuela.

== History ==
Linda Loaiza, a woman raped and tortured in 2001, was ignored by 59 different judges and had court hearings delayed 38 times over the span of seventeen years. The government also disregarded the American Convention on Human Rights in 2012, allowing them to ignore the jurisdiction of this, and related, bodies.

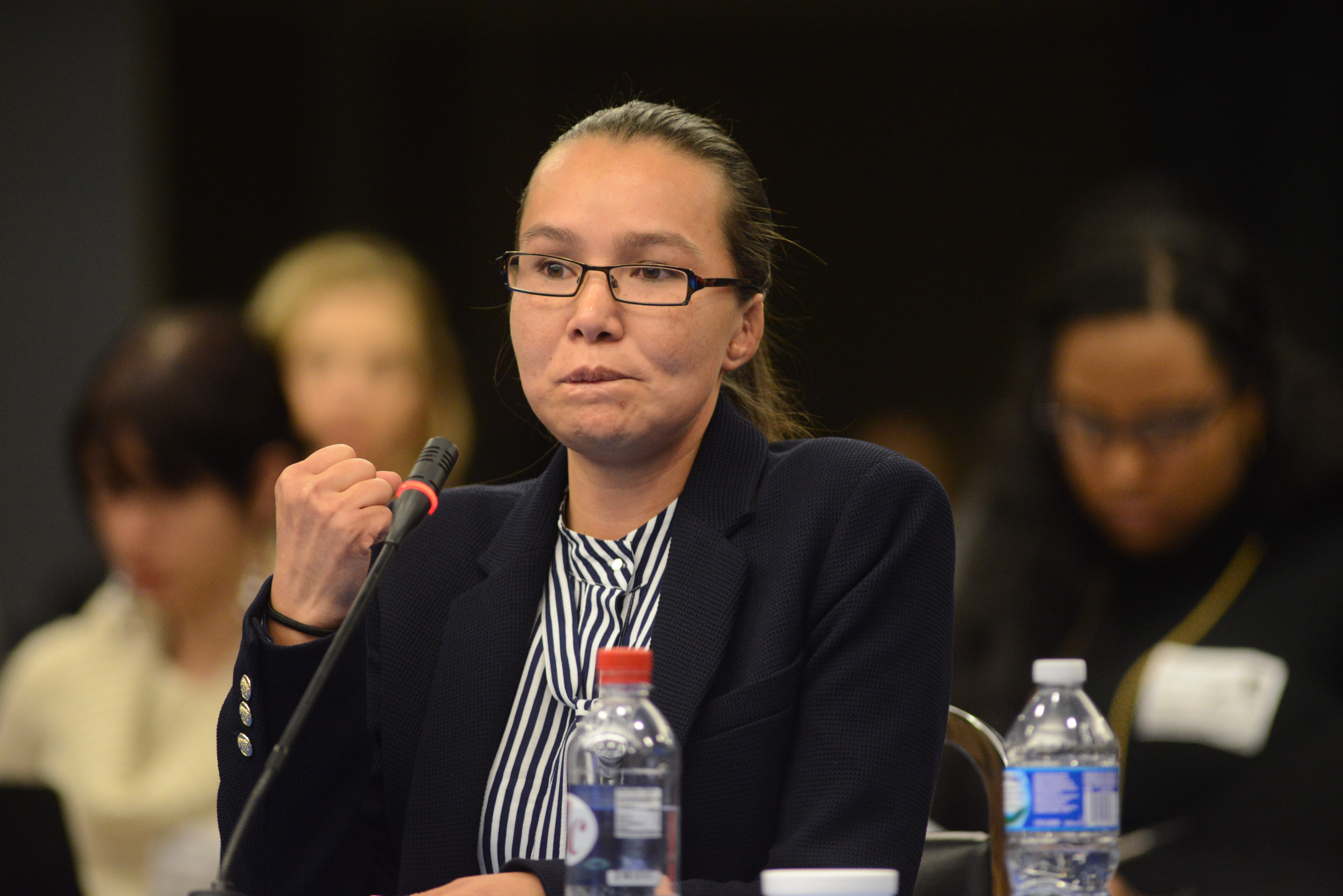
Linda Loaiza in the Inter-American Commission of Human Rights, 2016

In April 2021, after Venezuelan vocalist and member of the band Los Colores Alejandro Sojo was denounced for sexual abuse, several allegations of abuse, including against minors, were made public against musicians and artists in Venezuela. The hashtag #YoSíTeCreo (#IBelieveYou) started trending in social media. On 28 April, the Venezuelan Public Ministry opened an investigation against Alejandro Sojo; the drummer of the band Tomates Fritos, Tony Maestracci; and writer Willy Mckey after allegations were made against them.

== Obstacles ==
=== Crisis in Venezuela ===
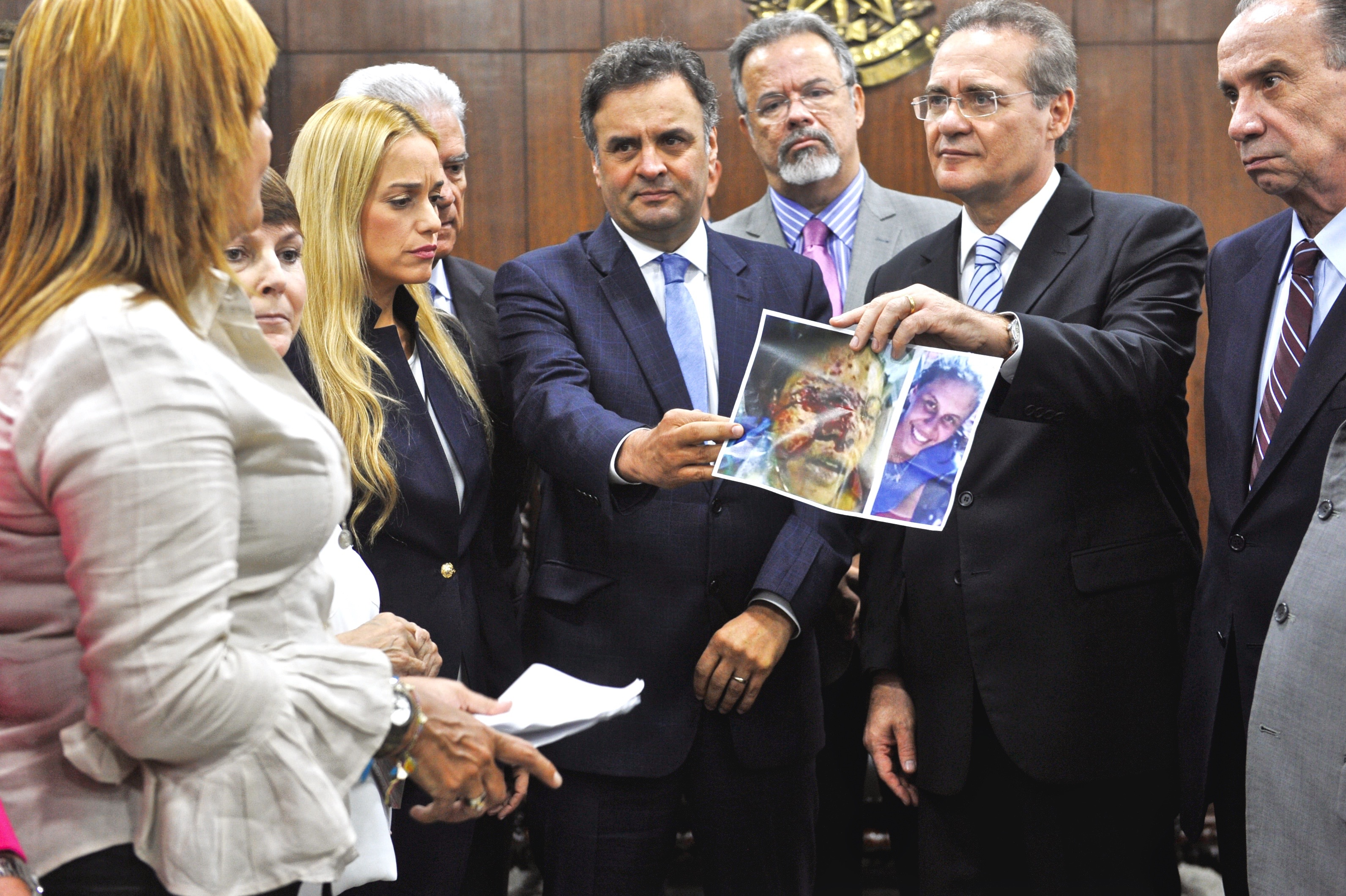
Lilian Tintori and Brazilian senators showing a photo of Geraldine Moreno, who died after being shot in the face by a Bolivarian National Guardsman with birdshot.

Mejía has said that the current crisis in Venezuela has contributed to increases not only in the direct physical violence towards women in the nation, but also to indirect violence. This indirect violence appears in multiple ways for multiple reasons. Healthcare in Venezuela is, as Mejía describes, a "luxury", and women are increasingly unable to care for children without this support - because of this, "[m]ore and more Venezuelan women are even opting to be sterilized". Mejía also says that the poor economy and migrant crisis means women are being forced into selling sex and, from this, "are vulnerable to sex trafficking". She states that "The crisis has made Venezuela's women much more vulnerable than men, more vulnerable to poverty, to neglect by the state, and especially to violence".

=== Objectification ===
External videos
- The strict beauty standards Venezuelan women experience, resulting in insecurity and surgeries on YouTube

Due to the rise of the beauty pageant industry, Venezuelan women have become highly regarded as objects of beauty and sexuality. Esther Pineda, a Venezuelan women's studies expert, stated that the popularity of Miss Venezuela and other pageants in Venezuela reveals how the country is "deeply sexist". Despite controversies facing Miss Venezuela, the Me Too movement has not carried any significance in Venezuela. According to Pineda, in Venezuela "[p]hysical beauty is seen as a value. ... And it's given more importance than any other attribute".

Miss Venezuela contestants may be subject to prostitution and sexual exploitation. Young contestants are passed to powerful individuals in Venezuelan society for sexual favors. In a poverty-filled country, vulnerable women turn to wealthy individuals for funds. With participation often costing tens of thousands of United States dollars, these participants perform sexual favors for their wardrobe, cosmetic surgery, photo shoots and for sponsorships in order to "create the illusion of 'perfect' beauty" that is held in esteem in Venezuelan culture. Some contestants allegedly involved in such acts include Miss Venezuela 1989 participant Patricia Velásquez and Miss Venezuela 2006 runner-up Claudia Suárez.

As the crisis in Bolivarian Venezuela worsened, Venezuelan women have relied on the pageant to find a way out of the poverty-stricken country.

== Statistics ==
The Venezuelan government does not provide reliable statistics regarding violence against women in the country. However, the Committee on the Elimination of Discrimination against Women stated in 2014 that violence directed towards women was "widespread and on the rise" in Venezuela.

Through 2017, there was still government "hesistancy to release health data on maternal and infant mortality rates, which [...] are increasingly dire", and with it also being noted that Venezuela "has an increasingly dismal transparency record when it comes to public information on the rates of violence and abuse". The Venezuelan Women's and Human Rights expert Luz Patricia Mejía stated that this all "makes it difficult, if not impossible, to create accurate national figures."

A periodic review by the UN in 2011 did note that "[c]ourts specializing in [...] preventing violence against women" in the country "had resolved 134,492 issues since 2008". Though, it explained that 85% of these issues were resolved by "conciliation mechanisms that included oral procedures and mandatory mediation", or therapy.

Sex trafficking networks between Venezuela and Trinidad and Tobago increased in the 2010s, with Venezuelan women being sold for hundreds of dollars to buyers based in Trinidad and Tobago, allegedly with the support of Venezuelan authorities. Venezuelan women deported from Trinidad and Tobago occasionally state that they were not there out of free will and were victims of sex trafficking.

== Law ==
In 2007, the country enacted Ley Organica Sobre el Derecho de las Mujeres a una Vida Libre de Violencia (Organic Law on the Right of Women to a Life Free of Violence).

The Organization of American States hosts an in-house agency, MESECVI, "for the promotion and protection of women's rights and gender equality". Its current technical director, the Venezuelan Luz Patricia Mejía, has said that "there is not yet a culture of justice for women". Mejía used to serve as a rapporteur for Women's Rights at, and as Commissioner and President of the Inter-American Commission of Human Rights.

A report initiated in Spain determined that, though "[c]ompared to other countries in the region, Venezuela has one of the more advanced legislations, being one of few to have broadened the focus of gender-based violence legislation to the areas of migration, trafficking and conflict and crisis situations", it is still a fact that "only 5 percent of the lawsuits filed by women in Venezuela end in sentences that favor their rights".

A United Nations report in 2014 noted "with concern" that though there had been "the establishment of the National Commission for Gender Justice", "many women have no effective access to justice, in the absence of effective strategies aimed at facilitating such access". Similarly to Mejía's belief above, the UN were "deeply concerned" about "the persistence of patriarchal attitudes and deep-rooted stereotypes" in Venezuelan society and culture. This culminated with the report's greatest concern: that despite laws implemented to protect women, "violence against women and girls is widespread and on the rise".

=== International recommendations ===
The 2011 UN review notes that Bangladesh "asked about initiatives to fight against gender violence" in Venezuela, with Thailand recommending that Venezuela "[i]mplement the [...] 'Bangkok Rules'", Vietnam that they "[a]ttach more importance to the protection of social vulnerable groups, including women". Canada, Myanmar, Cambodia, Angola and Sri Lanka recommended that Venezuela continue to pursue expanding women's rights and protections. Indonesia specifically called on the country to "[i]ntensify efforts to promote and protect women's rights, particularly in regard to gender based violence", and Slovenia said that they should "[t]ake all the necessary measures to eliminate violence against women, also by ensuring that perpetrators of such violence are prosecuted and punished, as well as by abolishing the stereotypical attitudes and patriarchal patterns of behaviour that undermine women's human rights".
