= Juan Pablo Pernalete =

Venezuelan student and basketball player killed during the 2017 protests

- Born: 28 December 1996
- Died: 26 April 2017 (aged 20); Altamira, Caracas, Venezuela
- Cause of death: Homicide by tear gas canister impact
- Parents: José Pernalete (father); Elvira Llovera (mother)

Juan Pablo Pernalete Llovera (28 December 1996 – 26 April 2017) was a student and basketball player killed during the 2017 Venezuelan protests. On 24 May the Attorney General of Venezuela, Luisa Ortega Díaz, declared that an investigation by the Public Ministry concluded that Pernalete died as the result of the impact in his chest of a tear gas canister fired by a National Guardsman. While government officials and pro-government outlets initially alleged that Pernalete had been killed with a captive bolt pistol by fellow protesters, in 2021 Tarek William Saab, Luisa Ortega's successor, acknowledged that Pernelte was killed by a tear gas canister fired by the National Guard.

== Killing ==
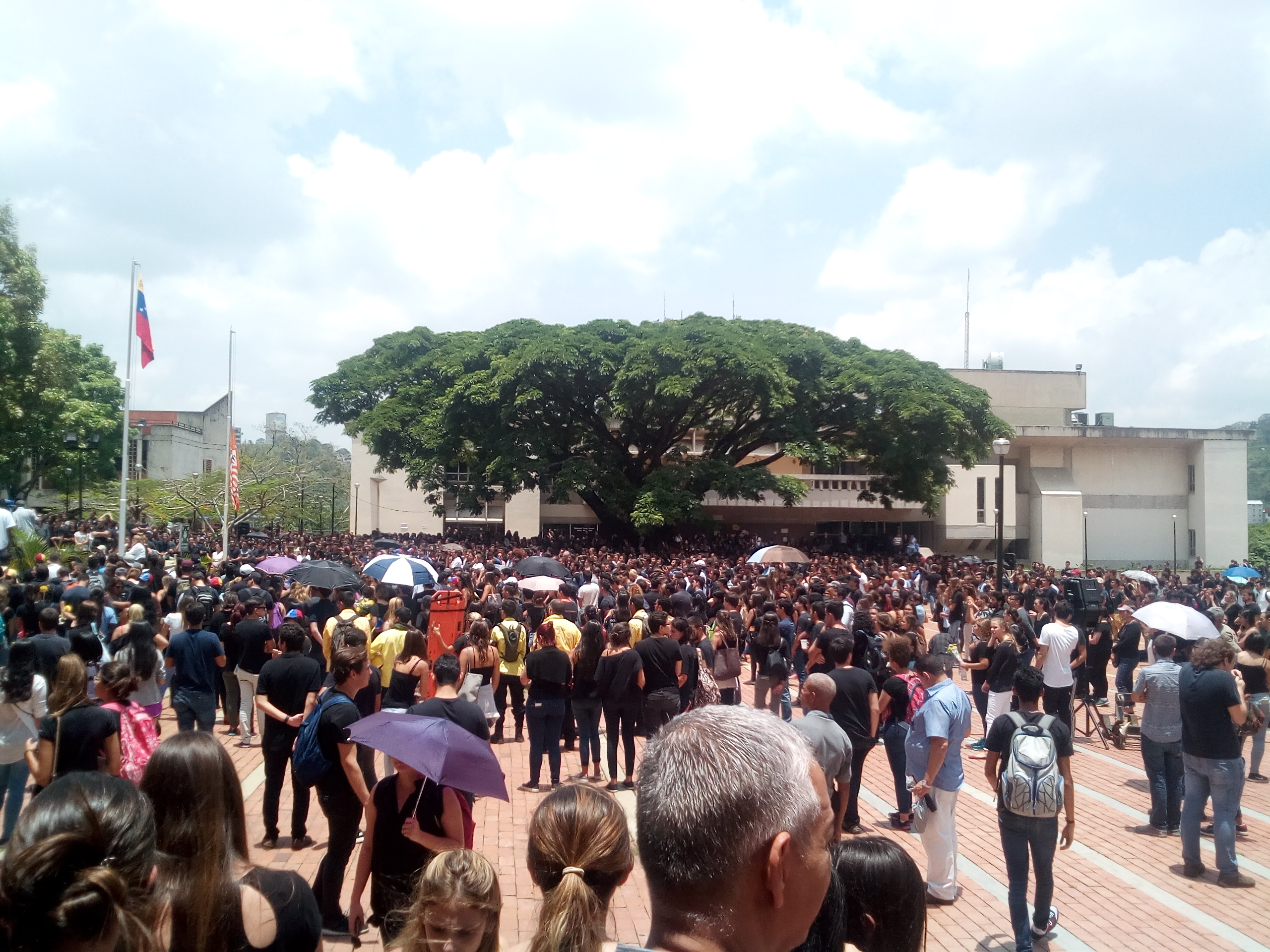
Mass in honor of Pernalete on 27 April 2017

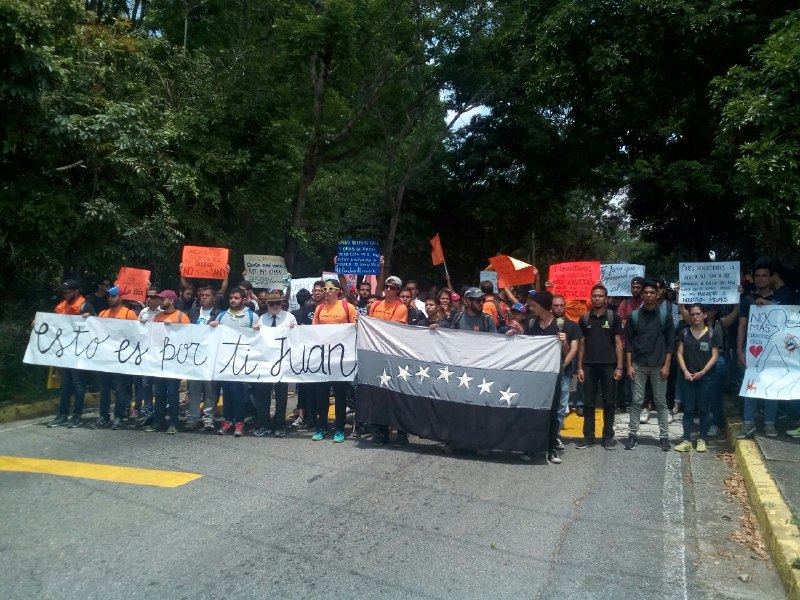
Silent march in honor of Pernalete on 27 April

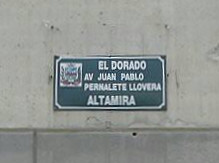
Juan Pablo Pernalete Llovera Avenue, previously Ávila Avenue, in Altamira, Caracas

Juan Pablo Pernalete studied accounting at the Metropolitan University of Caracas, where he received a scholarship to play basketball. At the age of 20 he was wounded, during a protest in Altamira, in the Chacao municipality in Caracas on 26 April 2017. The mayor of Chacao, Ramón Muchacho, reported that he arrived at Salud Chacao without vital signs.

The following day, students marched for two hours from the Universidad Metropolitana to the place in Altamira Square where Juan Pablo Pernalete was killed, after holding a mass in the university in his honor.

On 13 July, a night march was summoned in honor of those killed during the protests, including Pernalete, marching to the places where the demonstrators died. Dissident CICPC inspector Óscar Pérez made a surprise appearance in the march, before leaving and disappearing.

== Investigation ==
On 24 May the Attorney General of Venezuela, Luisa Ortega Díaz, declared that an investigation by the Public Ministry concluded that Pernalete died as the result of the impact in his chest of a tear gas canister fired by a National Guardsman.

A year after Pernalete's death, the crime remained unpunished. The killing of Juan Pablo Pernalete was documented in a report by a panel of independent experts from the Organization of American States, considering that it could constitute a crime against humanity committed in Venezuela along with other killings during the protests.

While government officials and pro-government outlets initially alleged that Pernalete had been killed with a captive bolt pistol by fellow protesters, in 2021 Tarek William Saab, Luisa Ortega's successor, acknowledged that Pernelte was killed by tear gas canister fired by the National Guard (GNB). Twelve GNB officials were charged with pre-intentional homicide.

== Legacy ==
On 11 June 2017 Juan Pablo's father, José Pernalete, declared in a public ceremony that one of his son's dreams was to be a player for the American National Basketball Association (NBA), and that said league sent them a recognition in which they sent their solidarity for his death. He said that with this action his son reached the NBA: "Our son came to the NBA, it was not the way we wanted him to arrive, but he arrived and now we have a fourth NBA called Juan Pablo Pernalete", in reference to the three Venezuelans that have played in the league: Carl Herrera, Óscar Torres and Greivis Vásquez.

On 11 June, the Avila avenue where Pernalete died, in the El Dorado sector in Altamira, was renamed with his full in a ceremony where the mayor of Chacao, authorities from the Metropolitan University and Pernalete's friends participated.

== See also ==
- Human rights in Venezuela
- International Criminal Court and Venezuela
- Killing of Armando Cañizales
- Killing of Miguel Castillo
- Neomar Lander
- Killing of Paúl Moreno
- Killing of Jairo Ortiz
- Killing of Paola Ramírez
- Killing of Xiomara Scott
- Killing of Fabián Urbina
- Killing of David Vallenilla
- Timeline of the 2017 Venezuelan protests
