= Freddy Guevara =

Venezuelan politician

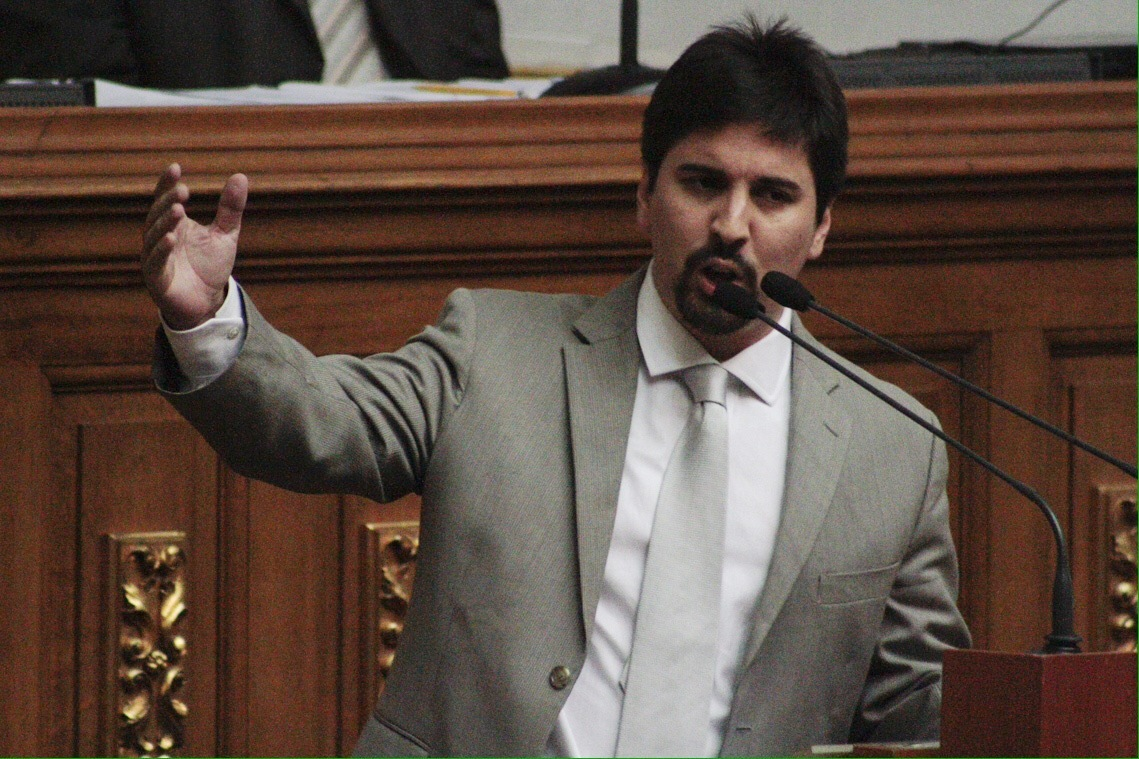
- Guevara in 2016

Deputy of the National Assembly
- In office 5 January 2016 – 5 January 2021

Personal details
- Born: April 3, 1986 (age 40) Puerto La Cruz, Venezuela
- Party: MUD
- Parent(s): Freddy Guevara, Zolaida Cortez de Guevara

Freddy Guevara (born 3 April 1986) is a Venezuelan politician. He was elected deputy to the Venezuelan National Assembly for Circuit 2 of the Miranda State (made up by Municipalities of Chacao, Baruta, El Hatillo and the parish Leoncio Martínez del Municipio Sucre) representing the Democratic Unity Roundtable (Mesa de Unidad Democrática, MUD) in the parliamentary elections of December 6, 2015. He has been a key figure of the opposition to Nicolás Maduro, Guevara was arrested in July 2021 charged with crimes against the state. The United States and others condemned the arrest as politically motivated. In mid-August, he was freed as part of negotiations between the Maduro government and the Venezuelan opposition.

== Education ==
Freddy Guevara has a major in communication from Andrés Bello Catholic University and a graduate degree in public policy from Harvard Kennedy School.

== Political career ==
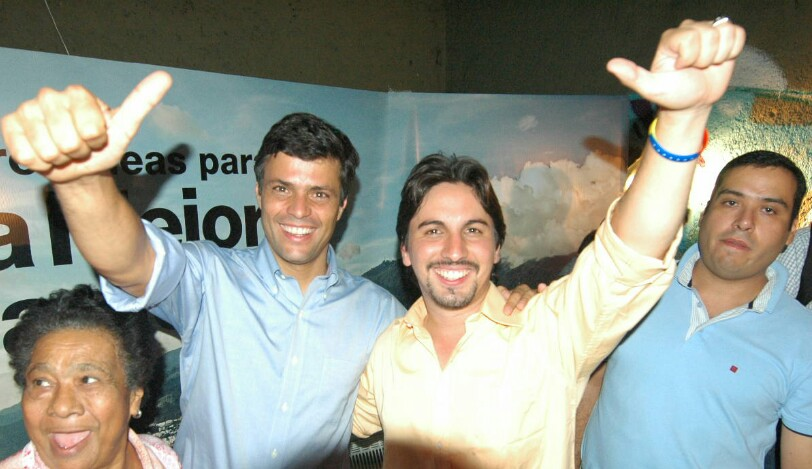
Freddy Guevara with Leopold López in 2011

In 2007, Guevara participated in the protests to end of the RCTV concession. Guevara and other student leaders actively participated in the electoral campaign for the "NO" against the Constitutional Referendum. In those elections of December 2007, the opposition conquered its first electoral triump, and Guevara consolidated as political leader. In 2008, Freddy Guevara ran for Caracas Metropolitan Council at the regional elections of November of that year, winning and becoming the youngest Councilman and highest voted in the history of Venezuela, obtaining 81.14% of the vote (171.657 votes).

Freddy Guevara was announced, in June 2015, as a consensus candidate for the MUD by the Miranda State for the elections of the National Assembly, which were held on December 6, 2015, as provided by the National Electoral Council.

On August 7, 2015, Guevara formalized his candidacy as a unity candidate for deputy for Circumscription 2 of the Miranda State. Subsequently, the MUD presented its campaign command for the parliamentary elections, which was named "Comando Venezuela Unida". Guevara was part of the executive team for the Command, along with Jesus Torrealba, Henry Ramos Allup, Julio Borges and Enrique Márquez, with the aim of leading the work of Venezuelan opposition candidates throughout the country, in conjunction with all members of the opposition coalition.

Guevara was sworn in as deputy with the rest of the MUD majority caucus on January 5, 2016, the day on which the National Assembly was installed for the 2016-2021 legislature.

On January 14, 2016, Guevara presented before the plenary of the National Assembly an agreement to exhort the Venezuelan State to comply with the decisions, resolutions, opinions and acts issued by international human rights organizations. The text, which was approved by a parliamentary majority, requests compliance with the opinions of international entities on human rights, in which judges, courts and other public bodies are encouraged to execute measures, opinions and acts issued by organizations such as the UN and the OAS. The measure benefits prisoners and political persecuted expressly mentioned in the document, including Miguel Henrique Otero, Leopoldo Lopez, Antonio Ledezma, Judge Maria Lourdes Afiuni, among others.

When a Constituent Assembly was promoted with the support of Nicolás Maduro's government to draft a new constitution for Venezuela in May, 2017, Guevara and the Democratic Unity Roundtable boycotted the election claiming that the Constituent Assembly was "a trick to keep [the incumbent ruling party] in power." Since the opposition did not participate in the election, the incumbent Great Patriotic Pole won almost all seats in the assembly by default.

At the end of October 2017, Freddy Guevara, declared that his political Popular Will (VP) will not participate in any elections called by Maduro's government "as a mechanism of denunciation against the dictatorship."

== End of parliamentary immunity ==
On November 3, 2017, the Supreme Court disqualified Guevara's parliamentary immunity after he was accused of instigating violence during opposition protests. The Inter-American Commission on Human Rights (CIDH) expressed its concern over the suspension of Guevara's parliamentary immunity.

On November 5, 2017, he fled to the official residence of the Chilean ambassador in Caracas. A statement issued by the Chilean Foreign Ministry notes that "The Government of Chile has granted (Guevara) the quality of guest of our Embassy." It added that “In the face of what he deemed immediate threats against his security and personal wellbeing, he has requested the protection of Chile.” From his refuge at the embassy Guevara stated: "Very soon we will see each other in the streets marching to Miraflores, not to overthrow Maduro, but to swear in a new President." In August 2020, Guevara was included in a wave of pardons for opposition politicians by the Maduro government.

=== 2021 arrest and release ===
In July 2021, Guevara was arrested while on a highway in Caracas; he was live-streaming as he was arrested. Juan Guaidó, a Venezuelan opposition leader, ally of Guevara, and disputed Venezuelan president, was also threatened by unidentified armed men in his apartment building parking lot the same day, but was not arrested. Venezuelan Attorney-General Tarek Saab stated Mr Guevara would be charged with "terrorism, attacks against the constitutional order, [and] conspiracy to commit a crime and treason" and accused him of "links with extremist and paramilitary groups associated with the Colombian government."

Saab later specified that Guevara had been arrested by the Bolivarian National Intelligence Service (SEBIN in Spanish), Venezuela's controversial premier intelligence agency. A Guaido spokesman stated Guevara was taken to SEBIN's Helicoide prison, also in Caracas. Guevara was later accused of links to violent gangs.

In mid-August, Guevara was freed as part of negotiations between the Maduro government and the Guaidó-led opposition. The move was seen as a concession by the Maduro government, which is seeking relief from American sanctions while the opposition is seeking free and fair elections and the release of political prisoners, such as Guevara. Guevara is expected to join the opposition negotiators in Mexico led by Gerardo Blyde, although he has said he was held in solitary and is unaware of whether or not he will participate.

==== Reactions ====
The United States condemned Guevara's arrest and "threats" against Guaidó, whom it recognizes as the legitimate leader of Venezuela. It also called for the release of all political prisoners in Venezuela.

== See also ==
- Political prisoners in Venezuela
