= Defensoría del Pueblo (Venezuela) =

State-funded human rights agency

Ombudsman of Venezuela
- Defensor del Pueblo
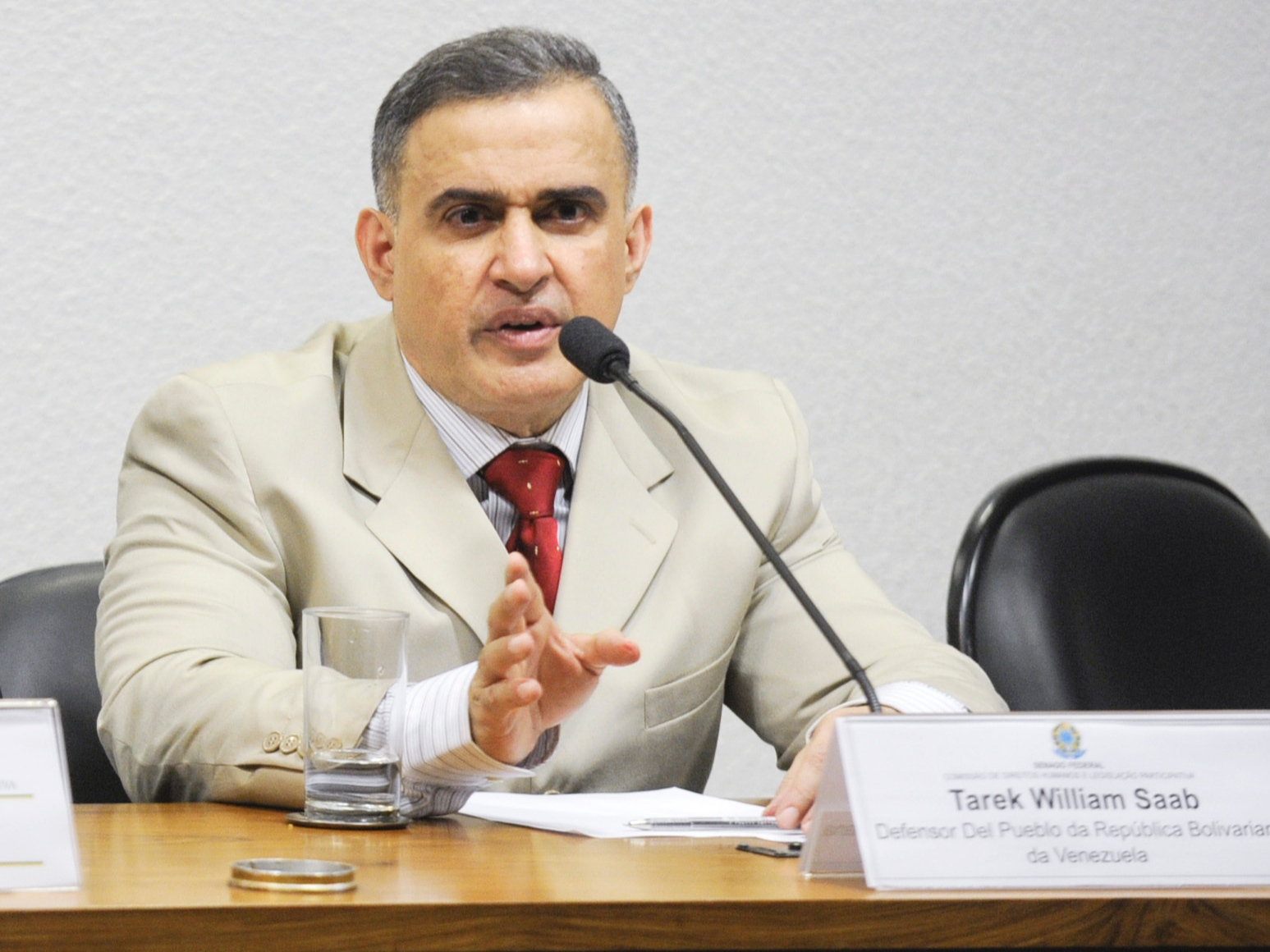
- Incumbent; Tarek William Saab since 26 February 2026
- Style: Citizen Defender
- Type: Ombudsman
- Member of: Republican Moral Council
- Reports to: National Assembly
- Seat: Caracas, Venezuela
- Term length: 7 years
- Constituting instrument: Constitution of Venezuela
- Inaugural holder: Dilia Parra
- Formation: 1999
- Website: www.defensoria.gob.ve

The Defensoría del Pueblo de la República Bolivariana de Venezuela (literally Public Defender of the Bolivarian Republic of Venezuela, though usually translated as Ombudsman) is a state-funded human rights agency in Venezuela responsible for investigating complaints against any public authority. Along with the Public Ministry (the Attorney General's department) and the Comptroller-General of the Republic, the office forms the 'citizens’ power' branch of the Government of Venezuela (alongside the executive, judicial and legislative powers). The three bodies collectively form the Republican Moral Council, a body established to promote moral and ethical behaviour by public officials.

Headed by an Ombudsman (Defensor (male) or Defensora (female) del Pueblo) appointed for a seven-year term by a panel of members of the National Assembly, the agency is based in Caracas with offices throughout the country. Created by the 1999 Constitution, it is recognised by the United Nations as the national human rights institution (NHRI) for Venezuela. It is thus a member of the International Coordinating Committee of NHRIs and of its regional grouping, the Network of National Institutions in the Americas. Being, as are most NHRIs in Spanish-speaking countries, an ombudsman institution, it is also a member of the Iberoamerican Ombudsman Federation (Federación Iberoamericana de Ombudsman) and other networks such as the Andean Council of Ombudsmen (Consejo Andino de Defensores del Pueblo).

The Defensoría exists to monitor and promote compliance with human rights and administrative justice. The 1999 Constitution tasked it with "promotion, defence and vigilance for rights and guarantees" set out in the Constitution and in international treaties, and the defence of democracy, social justice and the rule of law.

== Functions ==
The functions of the Defensoría include:

- inspection of any premises of any state organ or institution, with a view to the protection of human rights;
- presenting recommendations on draft laws or regulations relating to human rights;
- promoting signature, ratification, awareness and application of treaties and conventions relating to human rights;
- protecting individuals against arbitrary abuses of power;
- facilitating resolution of conflicts in relation to human rights;
- requiring compulsory production by any person or institution of any documents relevant to its functions;
- taking urgent action to avert violations of human rights;
- ensuring the proper operation of public services, and the conservation and protection of the environment;
- ensuring the human rights of indigenous peoples, and
- ensuring individual rights and freedoms.

== Specialist teams ==
The Defensoría has specialist "delegates" covering the following themes:

- Disability: services to persons with a physical or mental disability
- Environmental rights: environmental protection and the right to a healthy environment
- Women's rights, gender equality, and defence of women's rights
- Children and adolescents: the right to fair treatment of boys, girls and young people
- Youth protection
- Indigenous peoples
- Prison regime: the rights of persons deprived of liberty
- Health and social security

== Ombudsmen ==
Defensores del Pueblo
Order	Name	In office	Observations
1	Dilia Parra Guillen	1999–2000	Specialist in labour law and human rights activist
2	Germán Mundaraín Hernández	2000–2007	First man to hold the office
3	Gabriela Ramírez	2007–2014	Second woman to hold the office
4	Tarek William Saab	2014–2017	Poet, lawyer and former legislator
5	Alfredo Ruíz	2017–2026	Human rights activist
6	Tarek William Saab	2026–present	Poet, lawyer and former legislator

== Controversy over succession ==
The term in office of the incumbent Ombudsman, Tarek Saab, was due to run until 2021. On 10 December 2015, days after a general election in which conservative opposition parties had secured a majority in the National Assembly, the outgoing Assembly, dominated by the pro-government United Socialist Party of Venezuela, selected Judge Susana Barreiros to succeed Saab. The Assembly at the same time modified the law in an effort to prevent the incoming legislature, which opened in January 2016, from overturning the nomination. Barreiros had presided over the trial of opposition leader Leopoldo López Mendoza over his involvement in anti-government protests, and had in September 2015 convicted him of inciting riots and sentenced him to 14 years' imprisonment.
