= International Criminal Court investigation in Venezuela =

Situation in the Bolivarian Republic of Venezuela I
- The seal of the International Criminal Court
- File no.: 02/18
- Referred by: Argentina, Canada, Colombia, Chile, Paraguay, Peru
- Date referred: 27 September 2018
- Date opened: 3 November 2021
- Crimes: Crimes against humanity:

Status of suspect

An investigation by the International Criminal Court (ICC) to analyze possible crimes against humanity committed in Venezuela was opened in 2021. A preliminary examination was initially opened in 2006, and closed after concluding that the requirements to start an investigation had not been met. In February 2018, the ICC announced that it would open preliminary probes into alleged crimes against humanity performed by Venezuelan authorities since at least April 2017. In 2020, the Office of the Prosecutor of the ICC stated that it believed there was a "reasonable basis" to believe that "since at least April 2017, civilian authorities, members of the armed forces and pro-government individuals have committed the crimes against humanity", and on 2021 ICC Prosecutor Karim Khan announced the opening of an investigation regarding the situation in the country.

== Background ==
By 2006, the Office of the Prosecutor received twelve communications concerning the situation in Venezuela, most of them related to crimes allegedly committed by the Venezuelan government and associated forces and one to crimes alleged to have been committed by opposition groups. The examination was closed on 9 February 2006 because events related to the 2002 Venezuelan coup attempt in April 2002 were out of the jurisdiction of the Rome Statute, since jurisdiction for Venezuela started on 1 July 2002; while the submitted information on events taking place after 1 July 2002 lacked precision, had internal and external inconsistencies, and was considered by the ICC to be insufficient to justify opening an investigation.

== Preliminary examination ==
=== 2018 ===
In February 2018, the International Criminal Court (ICC) announced that it would open preliminary probes into alleged crimes against humanity performed by Venezuelan authorities.

In May 2018, a Panel of Independent International Experts appointed by the Secretary General of the Organization of American States (OAS) concluded that reasonable grounds existed to believe that crimes against humanity had been committed in Venezuela dating back to at least 12 February 2014 and recommended that the Secretary General of the OAS, Luis Almagro, should submit the report and the evidence collected by the General Secretariat of the OAS to the Office of the Prosecutor of the ICC, that he should invite States Parties to the Rome Statute to refer the situation of Venezuela to the Office of the Prosecutor and to call for the opening of an investigation into the facts set forth in the report, in accordance with Article 14 of the Rome Statute.

On 27 September 2018, six states parties to the Rome Statute: Argentina, Canada, Colombia, Chile, Paraguay and Peru, referred the situation in Venezuela since 12 February 2014 to the ICC, requesting the Prosecutor Fatou Bensouda to initiate an investigation on crimes against humanity allegedly committed in the territory. On 28 September, the Presidency assigned the situation to Pre-Trial Chamber I. This was the first time that member States had sought an investigation of potential crimes that took place entirely on the territory of another country.

=== 2020 ===
Nicolás Maduro's Foreign Minister, Jorge Arreaza, filed a complaint in the ICC against the United States on 13 February 2020, arguing that policy of sanctions has resulted in crimes against humanity. Prosecutor Bensouda stated that she informed the ICC Presidency of the referral pursuant to the regulations of the court to enable the assignment of the situation to a Pre-Trial Chamber, noting that the two referrals "appear to overlap geographically and temporally and may therefore warrant assignment to the same Pre-Trial Chamber", but "that this should not prejudice a later determination on whether the referred scope of the two situations is sufficiently linked to constitute a single situation".

In September 2020, the United Nations Independent International Fact-Finding Mission on Venezuela published their findings and cited evidence of unlawful executions, enforced disappearances, arbitrary detentions and torture in the country since 2014. The authors called for further action by the International Criminal Court, along with justice and reparations for the victims and their families.

On 2 December 2020, the Organization of American States General Secretariat released a 145-page report expanding on the 2018 report by the Panel of Independent Experts that concluded there was a reasonable basis to believe crimes against humanity were being committed in Venezuela, noting that since 2018 the crimes against humanity in Venezuela had increased in scale, scope, and severity, while criticizing the failure of the Prosecutor of the ICC to conduct her preliminary examination expeditiously and to open an investigation "despite overwhelming evidence of crimes within the Court's jurisdiction". Two days afterwards, the Office of the Prosecutor responded that it was aware and that it would study the Organisation of American States report and assuring the Office that it sought to "complete preliminary examinations within the shortest time possible", but regretting "the tone and manner of the report" and that Prosecutor and the Office "would not allow external attempts" to interfere with the process. OAS Secretary General Luis Almagro replied shortly after, declaring that the OAS understood due process and that they had "the utmost respect" for the International Criminal Court, but that three years was far too long "not for the OAS", but for the victims in Venezuela.

On 14 December, the Office of the Prosecutor released a report on the office's year activities, stating that it believed there was a "reasonable basis" to believe that "since at least April 2017, civilian authorities, members of the armed forces and pro-government individuals have committed the crimes against humanity" and that it expected to decide in 2021 whether to open an investigation or not.

=== 2021 ===
In May 2021, Maduro's Attorney General, Tarek William Saab, admitted that Fernando Albán, Caracas councilman who died in 2018 while he was detained in the headquarters of the Bolivarian Intelligence Service (SEBIN), did not commit suicide as initially reported by government officials, but was killed, and that during the 2017 Venezuelan protests student Juan Pablo Pernalete was killed with a tear gas canister by security forces, something initially denied by senior officials. William Saab would also accuse the ICC "process of lacking transparency". Maduro's vice president, Delcy Rodríguez, described the case against Venezuela in the ICC as a "great farce". The opposition National Assembly headed by Juan Guaidó declared that William Saab sought to prevent the ICC from acting and condemned that command chain was not being investigated.

On 2 July, the Pre-Trial Chamber dismissed a request for "judicial control" filed by William Saab, who alleged a lack of complementarity and collaboration of the ICC Office of the Prosecutor with Venezuela. The Chamber dismissed the appeal for its inadmissibility and for being clearly premature.

On 4 November 2021, prosecutor Karim Khan announced the opening of an investigation regarding the situation in Venezuela.

== Investigation ==
=== 2022 ===
On 17 January 2022, the Prosecutor's Office indicated that under Article 18 (2) of the Rome Statute, the administration of Nicolás Maduro had three months to submit its report on investigations by Venezuelan courts into crimes against humanity committed in Venezuela. On 7 April, Tarek William Saab stated that "there is no need" for an investigation by the ICC.

After failing to provide information about investigations by Venezuelan courts, Venezuela asked Karim Khan on 15 April that his office defer the investigation into possible crimes against humanity, claiming that state institutions were investigating or had investigated such crimes. On 20 April, Khan briefed a panel of ICC judges on Venezuela's request, stating that his office would ask the judges to reject the request.

On 1 November, Khan requested the reopening of the Venezuela investigation, just over six months after Venezuela asked the ICC to defer its investigation, stating that "the deferral requested by Venezuela, at this stage, is not justified, and that the resumption of the investigation should be authorized."

In response to the prosecutor's request, the Venezuelan State sent a document on 10 November, opposing the direct participation of victims and their representatives and requesting that the investigation be limited to summaries prepared by the ICC's Office of Public Counsel for Victims and only to cases presented by the Office of the Prosecutor. In the document, Venezuela also asks the ICC judges not to allow the participation in the proceedings of Canada, Colombia, Chile, Paraguay and Peru, the member states that referred the situation of Venezuela to the Court. The NGO PROVEA warned that the communiqué was part of the Maduro government's dilatory strategy to paralyze the ICC prosecutor's investigation for as long as possible, expressing: "This communication ratifies the Venezuelan authorities' contempt for the victims and their claims for justice, as well as their unwillingness to genuinely comply with the principle of complementarity".

=== 2023 ===
On 28 February, the Venezuelan government issued a statement in which it described the accusations against it as "fallacies" and denied that crimes against humanity had occurred in the country, arguing that the investigation had a "political character". The NGO Control Ciudadano warned that such actions by the Maduro government sought to discredit the ICC Prosecutor's Office and that it was evidence that the international court should exercise its jurisdiction over the cases under its investigation. Prosecutor Karim Khan responded to the allegations on 1 March, stating in a statement that the government's claim that no crimes against humanity had been committed was unsubstantiated and without sufficient evidence and that the Venezuelan authorities had not demonstrated that investigations or trials had been conducted at the domestic level that reflected the scope of the Court's ongoing investigation. The Pre-Trial Chamber asked Venezuela to submit a response of no more than ten pages, with a deadline of 20 April. On 3 April, Maduro's government accused Khan of "instrumentalizing" justice "for political purposes".

On 13 March, the International Criminal Court announced that it had received more than 2,000 forms from victims regarding the consultation on whether or not to continue the investigation. In view of the large number of testimonies received, the Court extended the deadline for receiving forms from 21 March to 20 April. On 20 April, the Court announced that the consultation process was "broadly participatory" and that applications included 8,900 victims, 630 families and two organizations. The Victims Participation and Reparations Section received 1,875 applications with their views and concerns, including 1,746 forms, 5 videos and 124 emails or other written documents. The information shared by the victims was compiled by the Section in a 57-page report and published the following day. The report describes that the victims "overwhelmingly" requested that the Court continue with the investigation, that the Venezuelan justice system was unwilling to genuinely investigate human rights violations, and describes testimonies of arbitrary detentions, torture, rape and persecution. Venezuelan Foreign Minister Yván Gil Pinto asked the Pre-Trial Chamber for time until 30 May to respond to the requests. The Chamber rejected the request on 8 May, ruling that it was not the procedural moment to do so and that at the current stage of the investigation no victim had yet been admitted to participate in the case.

On 24 April, the head of the pro-government delegation to the negotiations in Mexico, Jorge Rodríguez, called for a halt to the investigation at the International Criminal Court, stating that one of the objectives of the dialogue with the opposition was to request a halt to the judicial proceedings against the country.

On 8 June, Karim Khan made a third visit to Venezuela, where he met with Maduro's attorney general, Tarek William Saab. The meeting was held at the headquarters of the Public Prosecutor's Office in Caracas and the local press did not have access to it. Khan also met with Gladys Gutiérrez, president of the Supreme Tribunal of Justice of Venezuela, and privately with Nicolás Maduro at the Miraflores presidential palace. Human rights organizations questioned the opacity surrounding the visit. During the visit, the agreement to open an ICC office in Caracas was also confirmed, although without a specific public date. Ali Daniels, co-director of the NGO Acceso a la Justicia, argued that the installation of the office would not affect the course of the Court's investigation. Non-governmental organizations requested that the facility agreement be made public.

On 27 June, the Pre-Trial Chamber authorized Prosecutor Khan to continue investigations into crimes against humanity in Venezuela. The Chamber found that the domestic investigations in Venezuela did not adequately address the magnitude of the case and had unwarranted periods of inactivity. Maduro's government appealed the decision on 5 July, an appeal that was rejected by the Court on 21 July.

=== 2024 ===
On 1 March 2024, the Appeals Chamber denied the Venezuelan government's appeal against resuming the investigation into crimes against humanity.

On 6 September 2024, Uruguay additionally referred the situation in Venezuela to the court for investigation.

=== 2025 ===
on 9 January 2025, Ecuador additionally referred the situation in Venezuela to the court for investigation

== See also ==
- Human rights in Venezuela
- Independent International Fact-Finding Mission on Venezuela
- International Criminal Court and the 2003 invasion of Iraq
