= Larry Devoe =

Venezuelan lawyer (born 1979)

- Devoe in 2016

Prosecutor General of Venezuela
- Incumbent
- Assumed office 25 February 2026 (Note: Acting: 25 February – 9 April 2026)
- Preceded by: Tarek William Saab

President of the Republican Moral Council
- Incumbent
- Assumed office 9 April 2026
- Preceded by: Tarek William Saab

Personal details
- Born: Larry Daniel Devoe Márquez; 9 August 1979 (age 47) Petare, Miranda, Republic of Venezuela
- Party: PSUV
- Education: Andrés Bello Catholic University (LLB); University of Alcalá (MA)
- Profession: Lawyer

Larry Daniel Devoe Márquez (born 9 August 1979) is a Venezuelan lawyer and politician who has served as Prosecutor General of Venezuela since 2026. A member of the United Socialist Party of Venezuela, he previously served as executive secretary of the National Human Rights Council, director general of legal consultancy in the Office of the Vice Presidency, and legal adviser to several Venezuelan government institutions.

== Early life and career ==
Devoe was born in Petare, Miranda State, on 9 August 1979.

He graduated in law from Andrés Bello Catholic University, where he specialized in criminal and criminological sciences. He also obtained a master's degree in democracy, human rights, and the rule of law in Ibero-America from the University of Alcalá in Spain.

From 2005 to 2007, Devoe headed the Citizen Services Division of the National Telecommunications Commission (CONATEL). He subsequently served as an adviser and alternate agent representing Venezuela before the Inter-American Court of Human Rights.

According to records from the Venezuelan Social Security Institute (IVSS), Devoe had been listed as an employee of the legal services department of the Office of the Ombudsman since 2009, an institution he eventually headed.

On 14 May 2014, Vice President Jorge Arreaza appointed Devoe executive secretary of Venezuela's National Human Rights Council. On 30 November 2015, he was appointed director general of legal consultancy in the Office of the Vice Presidency.

On 1 November 2016, Devoe was part of the Venezuelan delegation to the United Nations Human Rights Council's Universal Periodic Review in Geneva, Switzerland, which examined the country's human rights record and its implementation of international commitments. He also participated in the delegation led by Nicolás Maduro during political dialogue negotiations with the opposition in Barbados.

In his capacity as executive secretary of the National Human Rights Council, Devoe opposed the entry of investigators from the Inter-American Commission on Human Rights into Venezuela.

In 2019, Devoe was included on a list of 43 Venezuelan government officials sanctioned by the Canadian government under Prime Minister Justin Trudeau. The sanctions targeted individuals identified as responsible or complicit in serious human rights violations, significant acts of corruption, or both.

In 2023, while serving as executive secretary of the National Human Rights Council, Devoe was appointed to two government intervention and restructuring bodies. On 17 March, he was appointed to the restructuring board of the National Superintendency of Cryptoassets and Related Activities (SUNACRIP), as published in Extraordinary Official Gazette No. 6,739. On 31 March, he was appointed to the intervention board of the Venezuelan Corporation of Guayana (CVG), as published in Official Gazette No. 6,741.

== Prosecutor General (2026–present) ==
On 25 February 2026, the National Assembly of Venezuela appointed Devoe acting Prosecutor General, replacing Tarek William Saab.
