= Alejandro Sojo =

Venezuelan musician

- Origin: Venezuela
- Genres: Rock
- Instruments: Voice
- Formerly of: Los Colores

Alejandro Sojo is a Venezuelan musician and former singer of the Venezuelan rock band Los Colores.

== Biography ==
Los Colores band was formed in Caracas in 2011 and started to receive recognition after participating Nuevas Bandas Festival in 2012, an event whose goal is to offer exposition and support to grassroots musicians in the country. In 2013 they started a concert of La Vida Bohème with songs of their debut album Clásico, and continued growing until their separation.

In April 2021 several allegations of harassment and of having sexual relations with minors were made against him. Sojo published a statement in social media admitting the allegations.

On 28 April, the Public Ministry of Venezuela announced that it would open an investigation against Sojo for the allegations of sexual abuse, along with fellow musician Tony Maestracci and poet Willy Mckey.

On 25 May the Public Ministry issued an arrest warrant against both Alejandro Sojo and Maestracci.

== See also ==
- Violence against women in Venezuela
