= Canizales =

Canizales (or Cañizales) may refer to:

- Alejandro Cañizales (1972–2018), Venezuelian journalist
- Armando Cañizales (c. 1999–2017), Venezuelian violist
- Carlos Cañizales (born 1993), Venezuelian boxer
- Cristhian Canizales (né en 1999), joueur colombien de football
- Gaby Canizales (born 1960), American boxer
- Juan Sebastian Canizales, Colombian football goaler
- María Elena de Cañizales (1942–2023), Venezuelian politician
- Orlando Canizales (born 1965), Mexican-American boxer
- Wilson Cañizales (born 1964), Colombian sprinter
