= Tony Maestracci =

Venezuelan musician

- Origin: Venezuela
- Genres: Rock
- Instrument: Drums
- Years active: 2007–2021

Tony Maestracci is a Venezuelan musician and former drummer of the Venezuelan rock band Tomates Fritos for fourteen years.

== Biography ==
In 2013 he participated in the concert Locos Por La Paz (Crazy for the Peace) in the BOD Cultural Center, in Caracas, where the National Network of Youth and Children Orchestras, Simón Bolívar Symphony Orchestra, Rock & MAU and other musicians played together.

In April 2021 several allegations of sexual abuse were made public against musicians and artists in Venezuela, including Maestracci. Tony responded to the allegations, denying them. Afterwards, Tomates Fritos informed about the resignation of the drummer.

On 28 April, the Public Ministry of Venezuela announced that it would open an investigation against Maestracci for the allegations of sexual abuse, along with fellow musician Alejandro Sojo and poet Willy Mckey.

On 25 May the Public Ministry issued an arrest warrant against both Tony Maestracci and Sojo.

== See also ==
- Violence against women in Venezuela
