= List of governors of Anzoátegui =

- State coat of arms

- Flag of the State
- Incumbent; Luis José Marcano
- Style: Governor
- Status: Head of State
- Term length: Four years

This is a list of governors of the Venezuelan Anzoátegui State:

Until 1989, they were appointed by the president of Venezuela. Starting from that year they are elected in universal, direct and secret elections.

== Elected governors ==
Took office	Left office	Governor	Vote
1989	1992	Ovidio González, COPEI	53.55
1992	1994	Ovidio González, COPEI	51.69
1994	1995	Dennis Balza Ron, Acción Democrática	49.56
1995	1998	Dennis Balza Ron, Acción Democrática	38.66
1998	2000	Alexis Rosas, MVR	34.25
2000	2004	David De Lima, MVR	41.74
2004	2008	Tarek William Saab, MVR	57.39
2008	2012	Tarek William Saab, PSUV	55.09
2012	2016	Aristóbulo Istúriz, PSUV	56.44
2016	2017	Nelson Moreno, PSUV	Replacement after Istúriz resigned
2017	2021	Antonio Barreto Sira, Democratic Action	51.69%
2021	2025	Luis José Marcano Salazar, PSUV	46.72%
2025	2029	Luis José Marcano Salazar, PSUV	%

== See also ==
- List of Venezuela governors
- Politics of Venezuela
- History of Venezuela
