= Killing of Fabián Urbina =

Venezuelan protester killed during the 2017 protests

Fabián Urbina (c. 2000-19 June 2017) was a Venezuelan protester killed during the 2017 Venezuelan protests.

== Killing ==
Urbina had been already wounded during a protest on 17 March near Universidad Pedagógica Experimental Libertador in Maracay. On 19 June 2017, Urbina was participating in a protest at the Altamira distributor in Caracas when a National Guardsman fired a pistol at protesters, fatally wounding him and injuring five more. Urbina was transferred to the El Ávila clinic, where he was admitted without vital signs at the age of 17. The Public Ministry identified those responsible and ordered their arrest. Interior Ministry Néstor Reverol admitted that the National Guard was responsible for his death.

A march in memory of Fabián Urbina was scheduled for 20 June; although it was rescheduled to 21 June due to the passing of Tropical Storm Bret, many still appeared to demonstrate through the storm. The following day, hundreds marched to the Organization of American States (OAS) headquarters in eastern Caracas, passing the spot where Fabian Urbina was shot dead by the National Guardsman.

On 13 July, a night march was summoned in honor of those killed during the protests, including Urbina, marching to the places where the demonstrators died. Dissident CICPC inspector Óscar Pérez made a surprise appearance in the march, before leaving and disappearing.

The killing of Fabián Urbina was documented in a report by a panel of independent experts from the OAS, considering that it could constitute a crime against humanity committed in Venezuela along with other killings during the protests.

== See also ==
- Armando Cañizales
- Miguel Castillo
- Neomar Lander
- Paúl Moreno
- Jairo Ortiz
- Juan Pablo Pernalete
- Paola Ramírez
- Xiomara Scott
- David Vallenilla
- Timeline of the 2017 Venezuelan protests
