= Willy Mckey =

Venezuelan poet (1980–2021)

- Born: Willy Joseph Madrid Lira; 11 September 1980; Caracas, Venezuela
- Died: 29 April 2021 (aged 40); Buenos Aires, Argentina
- Education: Central University of Venezuela
- Occupations: Poet and writer
- Writing career
- Language: Spanish

Willy Joseph Madrid Lira (11 September 1980 – 29 April 2021), known professionally as Willy Mckey, was a Venezuelan poet and writer. Throughout his career, he won several awards, including Fundarte Prize and the Rafael Cadenas National Young Poetry Contest. In 2021, he was denounced for sexual abuse, accusations that Mckey acknowledged, and the Public Ministry of Venezuela opened a judicial process against him. He committed suicide as a result of these allegations.

== Biography ==
Mckey was the son of a teacher and an operator of the Caracas Metro. When he graduated from high school, he spent a few months in a Catholic seminary proving his religious vocation. When he gave up, he decided to study a degree in letters at the Central University of Venezuela, from where he graduated in 2007.

In 2008, he was awarded the Fundarte Prize for the Vocado de orphanage award and in 2016, he won first place in the first edition of the Rafael Cadenas National Young Poetry Contest with the poem Canto 14. He was also co-editor and collaborator in Prodavinci; Together with Santiago Acosta, he was co-editor of the newspaper project El Salmón, which was awarded the National Book Prize in 2010, and in whose years he collaborated on the Papel Literario of the newspaper El Nacional. In 2014, he participated in the collective project Nuestra Señora del Jabillo, who mixed poetry with music. It was included in the compilation book "Nuevo País de las Letras" compiled by Antonio López Ortega, where it was listed among the 34 best Venezuelan writers of the generation born in the eighties. Mckey was included as an author in PROVEA's compilation of Venezuelan poetry between 1920 and 2018 "Against Repression."

In April 2021, several complaints of sexual abuse were made against him. Mckey issued a statement, acknowledging the allegations and announcing that he would withdraw from all his personal projects, including his collaboration in Prodavinci. On 28 April, the Public Ministry of Venezuela announced that it would open an investigation against Willy for the allegations of sexual abuse, along with musicians Alejandro Sojo and Tony Maestracci. On 29 April, Mckey killed himself in Buenos Aires, Argentina, jumping from the ninth floor of a building.

He left three unpublished poetic projects: Santo, a Yoruba-western; CoMYK, a quadricromic epic with poems like éste o éste otro (this one or this other); Pleistoceno, eighteen songs against oil; and a non-fiction book, Ruido (Noise), chronicles on music and violence.
