= Neomar Lander =

Venezuelan protester killed in 2017

- Born: Neomar Alejandro Lander Armas; 17 October 1999; Caracas, Venezuela
- Died: June 7, 2017 (aged 17); Francisco de Miranda Avenue, Chacao, Venezuela
- Cause of death: Thorax trauma
- Occupations: Activist, barman
- Parent(s): Zugeimar Armas and Neomar Lander

Neomar Alejandro Lander Armas (17 October 1999 – 7 June 2017) was a Venezuelan barman and protester who died during the 2017 Venezuelan protests.

== Biography ==
Neomar Lander was a high school graduate and had not been able to enter university because his parents did not have the resources and he needed to work. In May 2017, Neomar had completed a course at the Venezuelan Barmen Association to become a professional bartender. The same month, a photograph from the Agence France-Presse agency went viral showing Neomar throwing a stone during the protests in Venezuela in 2017 with a cast on his right foot.

At the end of May, his words in a video went viral: "The struggle of few is worth the future of many".

=== Death ===
Neomar died on 7 June 2017 during a demonstration on the Francisco de Miranda avenue in the Chacao municipality, Caracas, due to an impact to the chest. He was transferred to the El Ávila clinic, where he was admitted without vital signs. Interior Minister Néstor Reverol claimed that Neomar died while trying to activate a homemade mortar, but recorded videos of his death indicate that Lander fell after being hit by a tear gas bomb fired by Bolivarian National Police officials. On the night of his death, a man posing as Neomar's father and Zugeimar Armas' husband declared on the Venezuelan state television channel that Lander was paid to attend the marches. The next day Zugeimar denied the statements, showing who was Neomar's real father, that it was not the man who appeared in "NotiPatria", and that the protesters attended the marches on their own free will, since "80% of Venezuelans they were against the government".

On 13 July, a night march was summoned in honor of those killed during the protests, including Lander, marching to the places where the demonstrators died. Dissident CICPC inspector Óscar Pérez made a surprise appearance in the march, before leaving and disappearing.

The killing of Neomar Lander was documented in a report by a panel of independent experts from the Organization of American States, considering that it could constitute a crime against humanity committed in Venezuela along with other killings during the protests.

== Legacy ==
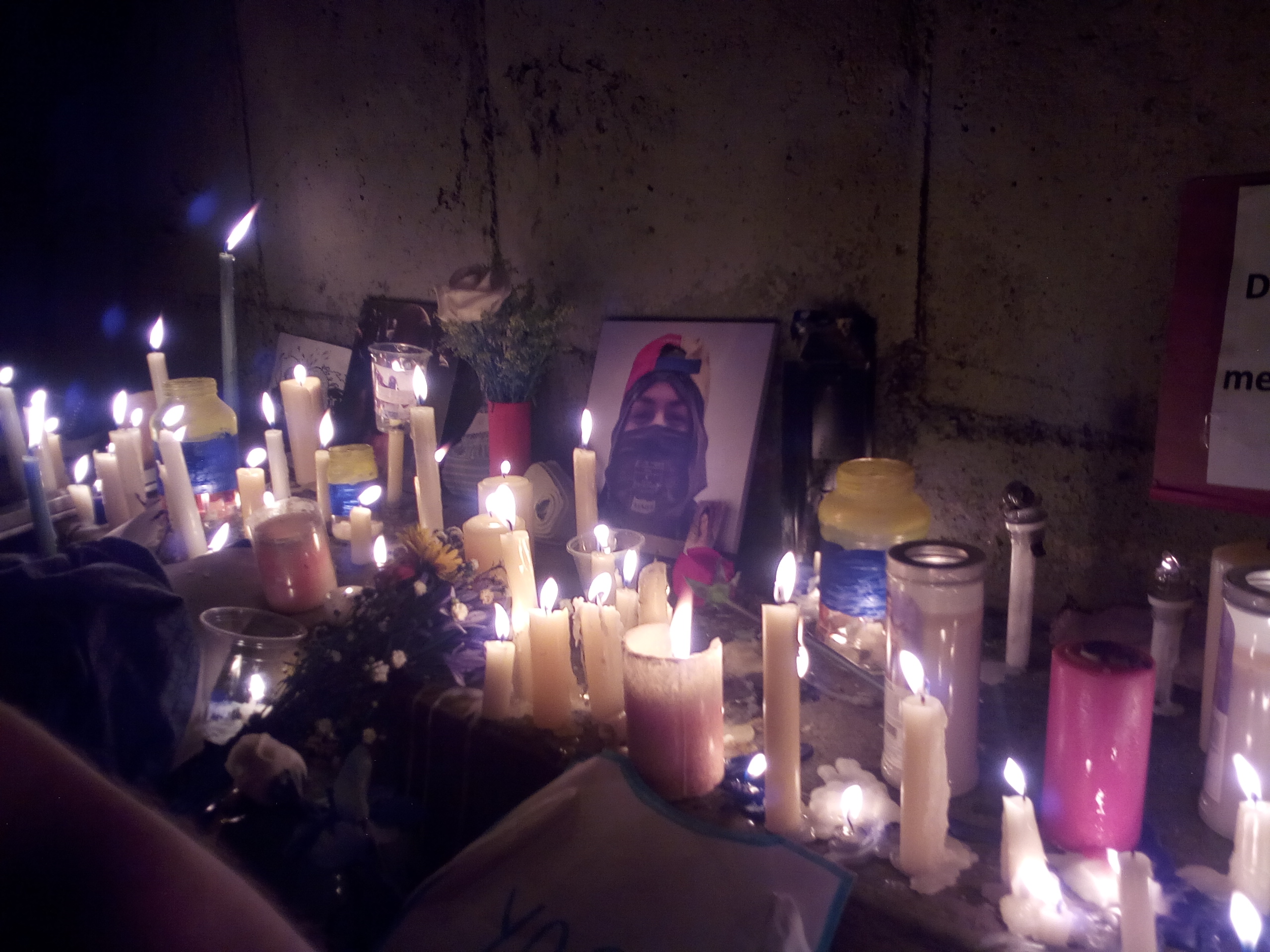
Altar dedicated to Neomar Lander.

During the 2018 Nicaraguan protests, Neomar's face was stenciled on various walls in Managua with his best known quote: "The struggle of few is worth the future of many."

The Chacao Municipality Mayor's Office named the underground connection between Avenida Francisco de Miranda and Avenida Libertador to the west of the city as the Neomar Lander Tunnel in his honor, just in the place where he died.

== See also ==
- Timeline of the 2017 Venezuelan protests
- Armando Cañizales
- Miguel Castillo Bracho
- Paúl Moreno
- Jairo Ortiz
- Juan Pablo Pernalete
- Paola Ramírez
- Xiomara Scott
- Fabián Urbina
- David Vallenilla
- Resistencia (Venezuela)
