= Gabriela Ramírez =

Venezuelan politician

- Predecessor: Germán Mundaraín
- Successor: Tarek William Saab

Gabriela del Mar Ramírez Pérez is a Venezuelan politician who served as Venezuela's Ombudswoman between 2007 and 2014.

== Career ==
Ramírez was a deputy to the National Assembly for the United Socialist Party of Venezuela (PSUV) and served as Venezuela's Ombudswoman between 2007 and 2014. During the 2014 protests, she asked to distinguish torture from "excessive or disproportionate use of force", arguing that torture happened only when used to extract confessions.

In 2017 Ramírez resigned as an advisor to the legal consultancy of the Supreme Tribunal of Justice after rejecting the call of the government of Nicolás Maduro for a National Constituent Assembly without requesting a prior popular consultation, like the 1999 Constituent Assembly did.

In 2019, her ex-husband posted a video on social media saying that Ramírez was in Spain and that she worked washing dishes.
