= Killing of Miguel Castillo =

Venezuelan social communicator killed during the 2017 protests

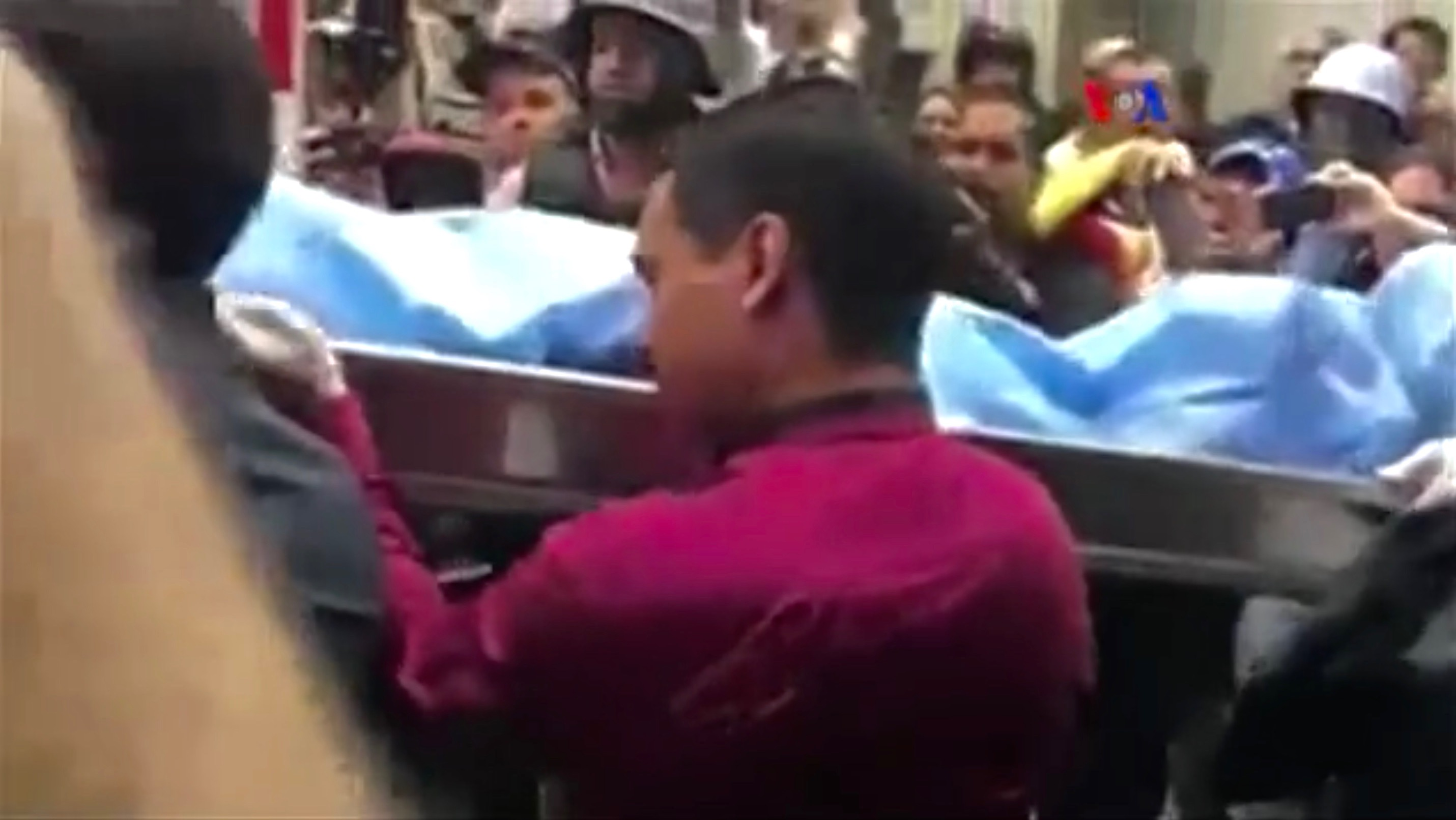
The body of Miguel Castillo Bracho being released from the morgue.

Miguel Castillo Bracho (died 11 May 2017) was a Venezuelan social communicator who was killed during the 2017 Venezuelan protests.

== Killing ==
On 11 May 2017, Miguel was on the main avenue of Las Mercedes, Baruta municipality, in Caracas, when National Guard officials fired metal spheres, hitting him at the left intercostal.

On 13 July, a night march was summoned in honor of those killed during the protests, including Castillo, marching to the places where the demonstrators died. Dissident CICPC inspector Óscar Pérez made a surprise appearance in the march, before leaving and disappearing.

The killing of Miguel Castillo was documented in a report by a panel of independent experts from the Organization of American States, considering that it could constitute a crime against humanity committed in Venezuela along with other killings during the protests.

== See also ==
- Armando Cañizales
- Neomar Lander
- Paúl Moreno
- Jairo Ortiz
- Juan Pablo Pernalete
- Neomar Lander
- Paola Ramírez
- Xiomara Scott
- Fabián Urbina
- David Vallenilla
- Timeline of the 2017 Venezuelan protests
