= Killing of Jairo Ortiz =

Venezuelan student killed during the 2017 protests

Jairo Johan Ortiz Bustamante (2 September 1997 – 6 April 2017) was a Venezuelan student. Ortiz was the first person killed during the 2017 protests in Venezuela.

== Killing ==
Jairo Ortiz was a student at the Universidad Experimental Politécnica (UNEXPO) in Caracas. On 6 April 2017, he was shot while participating in a demonstration held in Carrizal, in Miranda state, dying at the age of 19. The independent investigation carried out by the Public Ministry determined that the shots were fired by a Bolivarian National Police official, Rohenluis Leonel Rojas Mara, who drew his regulation weapon and fired multiple shots at a group of 81 young people, despite the constitutional rule that prohibits the use of firearms to control demonstrations.

The killing of Jairo Ortiz was documented in a report by a panel of independent experts from the Organization of American States, considering that it could constitute a crime against humanity committed in Venezuela along with other killings during the protests.

== See also ==
- Armando Cañizales
- Miguel Castillo
- Neomar Lander
- Paúl Moreno
- Juan Pablo Pernalete
- Paola Ramírez
- Xiomara Scott
- Fabián Urbina
- David Vallenilla
- Timeline of the 2017 Venezuelan protests
