= David De Lima =

Venezuelan politician

David de Lima

Governor of Anzoátegui
- In office 2000–2004
- Preceded by: Alexis Rosas
- Succeeded by: Tarek Saab (MVR)

Personal details
- Born: 1959 (age 66–67) Puerto la Cruz, Venezuela
- Party: MVR, MAS
- Profession: Politician

David Eugenio de Lima Salas (born 1959) is a Venezuelan politician.

== Career ==
He was elected Governor of the state of Anzoátegui in the 2000 regional elections for the MVR. He later broke with the MVR and lost to his MVR successor, Tarek Saab, in the 2004 elections.

De Lima was a member of the Movement for Socialism (MAS) for 32 years, but in 2012 described MAS as "a failed project". He was elected to the 1999 Constituent Assembly of Venezuela.

De Lima accused his successor as governor, Tarek Saab, of using his position for political persecution, after Saab's wife accused De Lima of mismanagement.

De Lima is a lawyer by training, having graduated from the Central University of Venezuela in 1987.

== See also ==
- 2012 Venezuelan presidential election#Capriles
