= Killing of Xiomara Scott =

Venezuelan nurse killed during the 2017 protests

Xiomara Soledad Scott (died 16 July 2017) was a Venezuelan nurse killed during the 2017 protests in Venezuela.

== Background ==
in response to the constitutional crisis and President Nicolás Maduro's plans for a Constituent Assembly, the National Assembly called upon a referendum an act of civil disobedience, especially since the National Electoral Council and the Supreme Tribunal of Justice are not recognized in the referendum. The opposition Democratic Unity Roundtable (MUD) announced that there would be 2,030 areas for the popular consultation nationwide to serve more than 19 million voters.

== Killing ==
On July 16, 2017, Xiomara was on the Sucre Avenue in Catia, Caracas, to participate in the 2017 national consultation called by the opposition. Colectivos on motorcycles passed by the voting center and shot at voters. Xiomara was wounded and transferred to the Ricardo Baquero González hospital, where she died.

The killing of Xiomara Scott was documented in a report by a panel of independent experts from the Organization of American States, considering that it could constitute a crime against humanity committed in Venezuela along with other killings during the protests.

== See also ==
- 2017 Venezuelan protests
- Armando Cañizales
- Miguel Castillo
- Neomar Lander
- Paúl Moreno
- Jairo Ortiz
- Juan Pablo Pernalete
- Paola Ramírez
- Fabián Urbina
- David Vallenilla
- Timeline of the 2017 Venezuelan protests
