= Negotiations during the Venezuelan crisis =

The negotiations during the crisis in Venezuela are the negotiation and dialogue attempts and processes between the government of Nicolás Maduro and the Venezuelan opposition. Although numerous dialogue processes and roundtables have taken place, by 2023 none had been effective in achieving a solution to the country's crisis.

== Background ==
=== Negotiations between businesses, trade union and the government in 2002 ===
Fedecámaras began to distance itself from Chávez whilst the new Constitution of 1999 was being drafted. Pedro Carmona indicates that the lack of dialogue between the government and businessmen during the constitutional process caused general discomfort in the business industry. Carmona thinks that the Constitution's specific points that irritated businesses are changing the nature of the armed forces to no longer be up for discussion or with public deliberation; the power granted to the president in terms of military promotions; the elimination of the bicameral Congress; the strengthening of presidential powers and the extension of the presidential term to six years with the possibility of immediate re-election; the loss of the balance between the ministers and chambers; > and the reaffirmation of a national ideology promoting statism and interventionism, which would limit individual and economic liberties. Vicente Brito, the then-president of Fedecámaras, added one more reason when announcing that his organization would support "No" in the coming constitutional referendum: a statement that Chávez had made on 18 November 1999 that had bothered him.

In the 28 July 2001 election, Carmona Estanga defeated Alberto Cudemus, a businessman close to Chávez, and succeeded Brito in the presidency of Fedecámaras. On 4 August, Carmona met with Chavez at the Military Academy of the Bolivarian Army, where they celebrated the anniversary of the National Guard; according to Estanga, Chávez said that he didn't want conflicts with Fedecámaras to continue, and they planned a meeting on 22 August at Miraflores. At the meeting, Carmona proposed a plan to lower unemployment by 17% at that time, improving conditions in order to increase private investment up to 20% of GDP in five years, and Chávez responded with a plan for strengthening the public sector. A table for dialogue was created between Fedecámaras and the government, the latter represented by Jorge Giordani, Minister of Planning. The meetings did not bring results: despite the fact that they happened once a week and that Chávez was present at one of them, the government continued to write the controversial 49 laws without sharing their content with Fedecámaras or its agricultural equivalent, Fedenaga. In the opinion of the opponents, this violated articles 206 and 211 of the Constitution.

In October 2001, some of the content of these laws had been leaked as rumors, and so Carmona and Chavez met at the Caracas Military Circle. According to Carmona, they had tense dialogue:

Carmona Estanga: President, a confrontation is approaching, a train crash; avoid the decrees being approved as intended; there have not been consultations about the projects, among them the Land Law, one of the most delicate.

Chávez: I hope you do not take up the defense of the interests of the oligarchy as a way to prevent the approval of a law that will allow the distribution of land to the poor.

Carmona Estanga: Another thing is agrarian reform. Please call a consultation, avoid a rupture that will be tragic.

On 13 November Chávez decrees 49 laws based on the Enabling Law, a legal instrument that allowed him to legislate without the approval of the Legislative Power, that was granted by the National Assembly in the previous November. Although originally two thirds of the Assembly were controlled by Chavez, the situation had changed as some deputies had become dissidents; it was unlikely that Chávez would succeed in obtaining another enabling act and so he passed these laws a day before this power expired. As such, several laws appeared, including the Organic Law of Hydrocarbons, the Fisheries Law, the Special Law of Cooperative Associations, the General Law of Ports. The most controversial was the Law of Land and Agrarian Development. Under this law, the Venezuelan government gained the power to take private lands if they surpassed a certain size and were classified as latifundia, or if the government believed that they weren't being used to their maximum potential; this also meant that the State must now approve the owner's use of the land. In addition, all owners were required to prove ownership of their land before 18 December, at the risk of losing them if they did not.

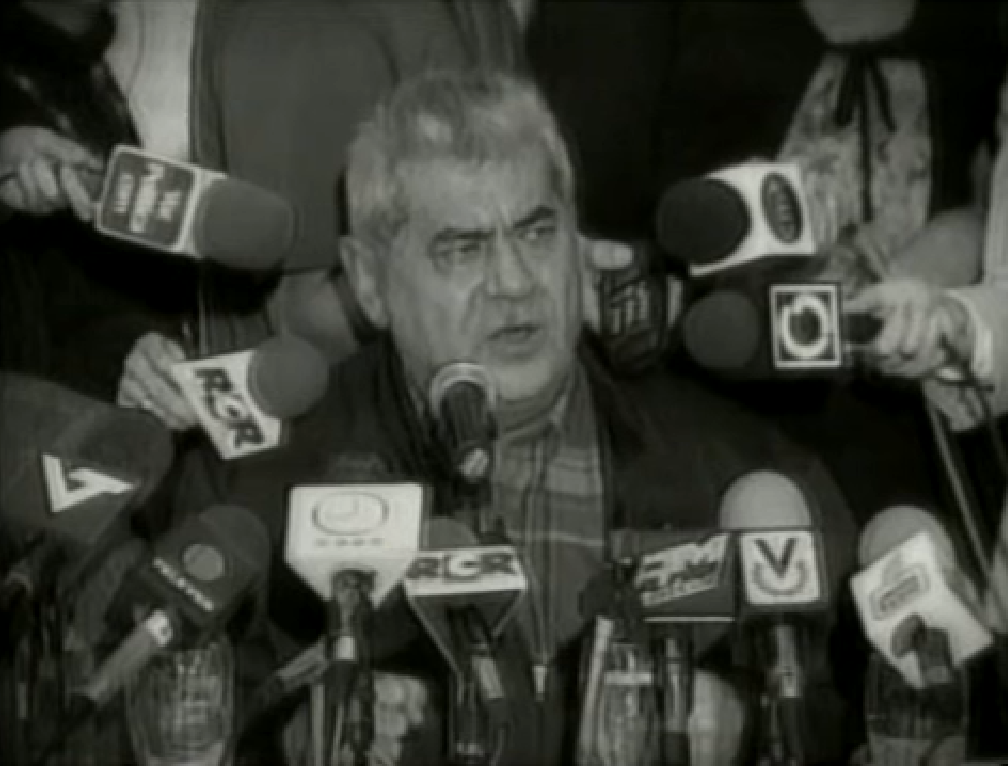
Carlos Ortega at a press conference (2002)

Carmona Estanga then suspended dialogue with the government and called an extraordinary assembly on 28 November. There he proposed that a national twelve-hour strike be held on 10 December, and he won the majority support of the business leadership, though the proposal was surprisingly rejected by Miguel Pérez Abad, the president of Fedeindustria. On 4 May, Fedecámaras joined Confederación de Trabajadores de Venezuela, the main trade union; its Secretary General, Carlos Ortega, was strengthened after winning the elections against the Chavista candidate, Aristóbulo Istúriz. However, the opposition political parties were divided in their opinions on how to overcome the political crisis. Acción Democrática insists on designating a medical board that proves the mental incapacity of the president, Francisco Arias Cárdenas and his deputies call for a referendum, the Movement for Socialism calls for more meetings on the Constitution, while Justice First and the Catholic Church ask the government for a change of course. All options come from a business perspective, since the parties still hadn't recovered from electoral setbacks in recent years.

Although firm in executing the 49 laws, Chávez does try to prevent Fedecámaras from carrying out the strike. During a luncheon with a group of businessmen and bankers on 6 December, the latter are pressured not to join the strike, with the threat of withdrawal of public funds deposited in their banks. As a result of this meeting, the Interior Minister, Luis Miquilena, prepared a compromise that was presented to Carmona Estanga, but both Estanga and Chávez reject it, a fact that deepens the separation. On the day of the strike Carmona announced that it was accepted by 90% of the country, though the government denied this; whether or not it was a success, though, both Chávez and Carmona said, in retrospect, that date was historical:

Today is 10 December and we celebrate [the anniversary of] many things. We are marking ten years of that December in 2001. It began strongly, and in an open manner, the bourgeois aggression, the bourgeois counterrevolution, on 10 December ... Then, that 10 December, the counterrevolution began openly, ten years ago, and they were preparing the military coup, the economic coup, then the oil coup came a year later, in these days of 2002.

— Hugo Chávez at the Teatro Municipal de Caracas on 10 December 2011

The strike on 10 December went down in history as the first major protest milestone of civil society. According to some historians, its success was greater than that of the general strike that overthrew Marcos Pérez Jiménez in January 1958, bearing in mind that the objective on this occasion was not to overthrow a government, but to request rectifications in a firm, but peaceful, manner; had this been understood, it would have avoided the crisis that was taking shape in the country, before the stubbornness and blindness of the rulers ... From 10 December, the opposition majority felt that they had legal tools to fight against the official outrages and the autocracy. Civil society, encouraged by the result of the strike, began an almost permanent presence on the streets.

— Pedro Carmona Estanga in his memoirs, "Mi testimonio ante la historia", written in 2004

Indeed, the conflict irreconcilably tore the businesses and the government apart; in the next two months Chávez makes two changes in his cabinet that show that there is no going back. First, he replaced the Minister of Agriculture and Lands for "a revolutionary professor" whose main mission was to make sure that the Land Law is executed; he then fires Miquilena from government. Although he publicly promises to continue cooperating with Chávez, in private he was disgusted by the aggressive discourse of Chávez and waits for the right moment to take control of the National Assembly.

=== Boston Group ===
The Boston Group was a parliamentary committee of the National Assembly of Venezuela financed by the Organization of American States (OAS) and created following the creation of the Venezuelan-American parliamentary friendship group, which in turn was created in 2002 after the coup d'état attempt. The group consisted of parliamentarians from the United States and Venezuela that agreed to meet outside the country to discuss important issues for both nations in a less polarized environment. Its objectives were to learn legislative practices, to establish and maintain a solid link between the United States Congress and the Venezuelan parliament, and to create an exchange of legislative information and cooperation in areas of common interest. Half of the Venezuelan members were opposition deputies and the other half were pro-government deputies. Among the members of the group were Nicolás Maduro and John Kerry.

Its executive committee was led by Pedro Díaz Blum and Calixto Ortega. Other members of the group were Cilia Flores; Luis Acuña; the vice president of CADIVI, José Salamán Khan; the rector of the National Electoral Council (CNE), Tania D'Amelio; Elvis Amoroso; Enrique Márquez; and Ángel Emiro Vera. One of the main themes of the Boston Group's discussions was poverty and the media. Cass Ballanger, who chaired the Committee for International Affairs of the Western Hemisphere in the US Congress, announced that five members of the group were going to get funding, donate equipment, and provide training for the National Assembly to have a public television station and a radio to transmit the debates of the Assembly and its commissions.

The first discussions of the Law on Social Responsibility on Radio and Television (Ley Resorte) were stopped so that the Boston Group could listen to the arguments for and against the law of owners of private media, in working groups. The Boston Group dissolved in 2005 after the retirement of opposition deputies during the 2005 parliamentary elections, which coincided with the creation of the official television channel of the Assembly, Asamblea Nacional Televisión (ANTV). Many of the laws passed by the Assembly during this period, including the Resorte Law, ignored the arguments and conclusions from the working groups of the Boston Group.

== History ==
=== 2014 protests ===
During the protests in Venezuela in 2014, the government held a series of meetings from 26 February 2014, known as the "National Conference for Peace", where various sectors of society met together. The Democratic Unity Roundtable (MUD) announced that it would not participate in the National Peace Conference at that time, declaring that "it would not lend itself to a simulation of dialogue", with Julio Borges, secretary of the Justice First opposition party, adding that the MUD had not participated because it did not know the meeting agenda proposed by the government, and believes that the main points discussed should be around disarmament of armed groups, the release of detained students, the separation of powers, the release of Leopoldo López, among other points.

On 10 April the first round table was held between representatives of the Venezuelan opposition and members of the national government. The meeting took place in the Ayacucho Room of Miraflores Palace. The meeting was chaired and mediated by Colombian Foreign Minister María Ángela Holguín, Ecuadorian Foreign Minister Ricardo Patiño, and Brazilian Foreign Minister Luiz Alberto Figueiredo, all from the Union of South American Nations (UNASUR), as well as a representative from the Holy See through the Apostolic Nunciature, at the request of the Venezuelan opposition. President Maduro was accompanied by several senior politicians, among them the First Lady Cilia Flores; Vice President Jorge Arreaza; Foreign Minister Elías Jaua, Secretary of the Tupamaro Movement, José Tomás Pinto; and the mayor of the Libertador municipality, Jorge Rodríguez. The governor of Miranda, Henrique Capriles Radonski, was accompanied by different representatives of the MUD, including Ramón Guillermo Aveledo and Henry Ramos Allup. The meeting had 22 speakers in total, eleven from the MUD, and eleven from the government. The members played different songs for five hours on the national radio and television network. Pope Francis sent a letter to the members of the meeting, which opened discussions.

=== 2016 recall referendum ===
In 2016, the opening stage of the recall referendum was suspended by the National Electoral Council (CNE) on 20 October, citing the decision of the regional courts of Apure, Aragua, Bolívar, Carabobo and Monagas. The votes were annulled, due to accusations of fraud by the Democratic Unity Roundtable. The opposition called for peaceful mass marches called "takeover of Venezuela" from 26 October 2016.

A few days later, the opposition announced the suspension of the "March to Miraflores" planned for 3 November 2016, whose destination was the Miraflores Palace in Caracas. The march was suspended after opposition representatives met with Thomas Shannon, US Under Secretary of State for Political Affairs, and Archbishop Claudio María Celli, who was sent by the Vatican as mediator of the conflict in Venezuela, negotiating the participation of the opposition at a dialogue table with the government.

=== 2017 protests ===
During the protests in Venezuela in 2017, in September, the government and the opposition began negotiations again in Santo Domingo, Dominican Republic. After Operación Gedeón, in which the dissident Óscar Pérez died during a clash with security forces, the interior minister said he had obtained information for the operation at tables of dialogue. The coalition of the Democratic Unity Roundtable denied providing information and the operation, describing it as an "extrajudicial execution". The MUD issued a statement to President Danilo Medina, demanding that the Venezuelan government clarify the statements offered by Minister Reverol on the case of Pérez and said that the debate should not continue with the climate of tension that exists. The opposition delegation did not attend the last meeting scheduled for 18 January 2018, citing the operation as one of the reasons why it did not participate.

=== Presidential crisis ===
==== 2019 ====
On 22 January 2019, Mexico and Uruguay called for talks to reduce the tensions between government and opposition supports to prevent an escalation of violence.

On 24 January, the secretary-general of the UN, António Guterres, issued a call for dialogue, asking all the parties to tamper tensions and open an independent and transparent investigation into the events of the 23 January.

On 28 January, Pope Francis reiterates his call for dialogue by specifically stating "that it be carried out in a climate of peace and justice."

On 30 January, Mexico and Uruguay announce the convening of an International Conference on the Situation in Venezuela to be held in Uruguay on 7 February "to lay the foundations to establish a new dialogue mechanism that, with the inclusion of all Venezuelan forces, will contribute to return the stability and peace of this country", according to the statement of the Ministry of Foreign Affairs of Uruguay. The initiative is proposed, they point out, in response to the call of Gutierres and of Pope Francis for dialogue. Bolivia joins the initiative hours after the announcement.

On 31 January, the EU's High Representative for Foreign Affairs and Security Policy, Federica Mogherini, announced the creation of the Contact Group on Venezuela, initially composed of eight European countries and four Latin American countries (Uruguay, France, Germany, Italy, the Netherlands, Portugal, the United Kingdom, Sweden, Spain, Ecuador, Costa Rica and Bolivia). During their first meeting on 7 February, Uruguay alongside the participating states—with the exception of Bolivia and Mexico—agreed to form the International Contact Group on Venezuela and issued a jointly signed declaration which called for new elections to occur in Venezuela.

A US-drafted UN Security Council resolution calling for free and fair presidential elections in Venezuela received majority support, but it was vetoed by Russia and China on 28 February, with South Africa voting against the resolution as well. A Russian counter-resolution calling for a dialogue between the Maduro government and the opposition based on the Montevideo mechanism, was voted against by France, the United Kingdom, the United States, Germany, Poland, Peru and Belgium while only 4 countries voted in favor of the resolution.

Juan Guaidó declared that the National Assembly will not participate in the dialogue with Maduro. His reasoning is that it comes to nothing and has already been done "inside and outside Venezuela, in private and in public, alone and with international companions." He says that the result in each case has been more repressive, with Maduro taking advantage of the process to strengthen the dictatorship. Offering as examples Leopoldo López, the detention of Juan Requesens, the exile of Julio Borges, among others, he said that if Maduro really wanted dialogue, he would free the political prisoners.

Referring to a letter that Maduro wrote asking for help from Pope Francis, Guaidó rejected the Vatican's offer to mediate if both sides accepted, calling the attempt "false dialogue" and said the Vatican could help those who "refused to see the Venezuelan reality". Guaidó said Maduro did not respect the terms of the 2016 negotiations and suggested that the pope could encourage Maduro to allow an orderly transition of power.

Corriere della Sera cited an edited copy of a private letter sent by Pope Francis to Maduro on February 7 in response to a letter that Maduro wrote asking the pope for mediation. In the letter, the Pope refers to Maduro as "His Excellency Mr. Nicolás Maduro Moros" and says that previous negotiating agreements have not been met. The conditions, still applicable, were the opening of a humanitarian channel, the convocation of free elections, the freedom for political prisoners and the reestablishment of the powers of the National Assembly. According to Andrea Gagliarducci, writing for the Catholic News Agency, the Pope accepted the position taken by the Venezuelan bishops, who maintain that Maduro's election was illegitimate, by not addressing him as president.

Following the failed military uprising, representatives of Guaidó and Maduro began mediation with the assistance of the Norwegian Centre for Conflict Resolution. Jorge Rodríguez and Héctor Rodríguez Castro served as representatives for Maduro while Gerardo Blyde and Stalin González were representatives for Guaidó. Guaidó confirmed that there was an envoy in Norway, but assured that the opposition would not take part in "any kind of fake negotiations". After the second meeting in Norway, no deal was reached. During a rally in June, Guaidó announced that there were no plans for further talks in Norway, "not on the table today. Why not? Because if anything that does not move us toward (Maduro's resignation) is useless", he said. Guaidó also declared that the next time there is a meeting in Oslo it would be because they are closer to the "cease of usurpation, transition government and free elections".

On 9 July 2019 negotiations started in Barbados with representatives of Nicolás Maduro and Juan Guaidó. Several theories arose from the negotiations, including potential elections agreed upon between the government and the opposition, having Héctor Rodríguez as the main government candidate. On 15 September, Guaidó announced that the opposition concluded the dialogue after the absence of the government in the negotiations for 40 days as a protest to the recent sanctions by the United States.

==== 2020 ====
In February 2020, the coordinator of the Lima Group, Hugo de Zela, announced that three of its member countries, – Argentina, Canada and Peru – were attempting to negotiate with the Cuban government to find a solution to the crisis. Although no details of the negotiation were leaked, it was confirmed by officials in Buenos Aires.

In late March 2020, the United States relaxed its position and proposed a transitional government that would exclude both Maduro and Guaidó from the presidency. Secretary of State Mike Pompeo said that sanctions did not apply to humanitarian aid during the coronavirus pandemic health emergency and that the United States would lift all sanctions if Maduro agreed to organize elections that did not include himself in a period of six to twelve months. Pompeo reiterated U.S. support for Juan Guaidó. The deal would enforce a power-sharing scenario between the different government factions, and the US would remove all sanctions should it be agreed to. Elections would have to be held within the year, and all foreign militaries (particularly noted were Cuba and Russia) would have to leave the country. The US were still seeking Maduro's arrest at the time of the announcement. Other aspects of the US deal would include releasing all political prisoners and setting up a five-person council to lead the country; two members each chosen by Maduro and Guaidó would sit on the council, with the last member selected by the four. The EU also agreed to remove sanctions if the deal went ahead. Experts have noted that the deal is similar to earlier proposals but explicitly mentions who would lead a transitional government, something which stalled previous discussions, and comes shortly after the US indicted Maduro, which may pressure him to peacefully leave power.

Guaidó accepted the proposal, while Venezuela's foreign minister, Jorge Arreaza, rejected it and declared that only parliamentary elections would take place that year.

Reuters reported that during the COVID-19 pandemic, allies of both Nicolás Maduro and Juan Guaidó had secretly begun exploratory talks, according to sources on both sides. Guaidó and U.S. Special Representative for Venezuela Elliott Abrams have denied that negotiations have taken place.

==== 2021 ====
After the announcement of regional elections in 2021, Guaidó announced a "national salvation agreement" and proposed the negotiation with Maduro with a schedule for free and fair elections, with international support and observers, in exchange of lifting the international sanctions.

=== 2023 ===
On April 24, the head of the pro-government delegation to the negotiations in Mexico, Jorge Rodriguez, called for a halt to the investigation at the International Criminal Court about the situation in Venezuela, stating that one of the objectives of the dialogue with the opposition was to request a halt to the judicial proceedings against the country.

=== 2026 ===
Following the capture and extradition of President Nicolás Maduro by United States forces on 3 January 2026 and the assumption of the presidency by Acting President Delcy Rodríguez, efforts to negotiate Venezuela's political transition resumed after more than two years without formal dialogue between the government and the opposition. In July 2026, representatives of Venezuela's interim government and members of the opposition-led National Assembly elected in 2015 announced that formal negotiations would begin on 1 August. The talks followed an earlier meeting between National Assembly president Jorge Rodríguez, representing the interim government, and former opposition legislator Dinorah Figuera, who had returned to Venezuela after several years in exile. Both sides described the initiative as a joint political and technical agenda intended to promote national reconciliation, institutional reform, political stability and reconstruction following the 2026 Venezuela earthquakes.

== Public opinion ==
In December 2017, a survey by Venebarómetro showed that 49.8% of Venezuelans disagreed with the dialogue that was taking place in the Dominican Republic.

Following the announcement of a new round of negotiations in July 2026, public opinion remained cautiously supportive of dialogue while expressing skepticism over its prospects. According to a Meganalisis poll published in late July, a majority of Venezuelans supported negotiations as the preferred path toward democratic normalization and competitive elections, though many respondents questioned whether the process would result in meaningful institutional reforms. The survey also found that the release of political prisoners, the return of political exiles, guarantees for free and fair elections, and economic recovery ranked among the public's principal priorities for the negotiations.

As preparations for the first in-person negotiations continued, former president Nicolás Maduro publicly expressed support for the dialogue process and called on supporters of Chavismo to back the negotiations. U.S. Secretary of State Marco Rubio stated that the United States viewed institutional reforms, including changes to the National Electoral Council, restoration of political rights, and guarantees for civil liberties, as prerequisites for future presidential elections. Rubio also indicated that while elections remained the objective of the transition process, the timing would depend on the implementation of these reforms rather than adherence to a fixed electoral schedule.

== See also ==
- International Conference on the Situation in Venezuela
