= Killing of Paúl Moreno =

Venezuelan student killed during the 2017 protests

Paúl René Moreno Camacho (c. 1992–18 May 2017) was a Venezuelan student and Green Cross volunteer killed during the 2017 Venezuelan protests.

== Killing ==
Paúl Moreno was a fifth-year medical student at the University of Zulia and was a volunteer paramedic for the Green Cross. On 18 May 2017, Paúl was nearby the Fuerzas Armadas Avenue in Maracaibo, when the driver of a vehicle rammed over a barricade, running over him and escaping from the scene. Moreno was transferred to the Adolfo Pons Hospital, where he died at the age of 24.

The killing of Paúl Moreno was documented in a report by a panel of independent experts from the Organization of American States, considering that it could constitute a crime against humanity committed in Venezuela along with other killings during the protests.

== Investigations ==
On 17 November 2017, Omar Barrios, held responsible for Paúl's death, was sentenced to 19 months of house arrest, after which he would have a presentation regime every 15 days. The sentence signed by the judge in charge of the case, Yesiré Rincón, incorrectly established that Moreno died in 2009 and not in 2017, and judge Rincón argued that the qualification of intentional homicide could not be applied because the criterion was approved in 2011. The irregularity of the sentence was denounced in a statement by Carlos Moreno, Paúl's brother.

== See also ==
- 2017 Venezuelan protests
- Armando Cañizales
- Miguel Castillo
- Jairo Ortiz
- Juan Pablo Pernalete
- Neomar Lander
- Paola Ramírez
- Xiomara Scott
- Fabián Urbina
- David Vallenilla
- Timeline of the 2017 Venezuelan protests
- Vehicle-ramming attack
