= Luisa Ortega Díaz =

Venezuelan lawyer (born 1958)

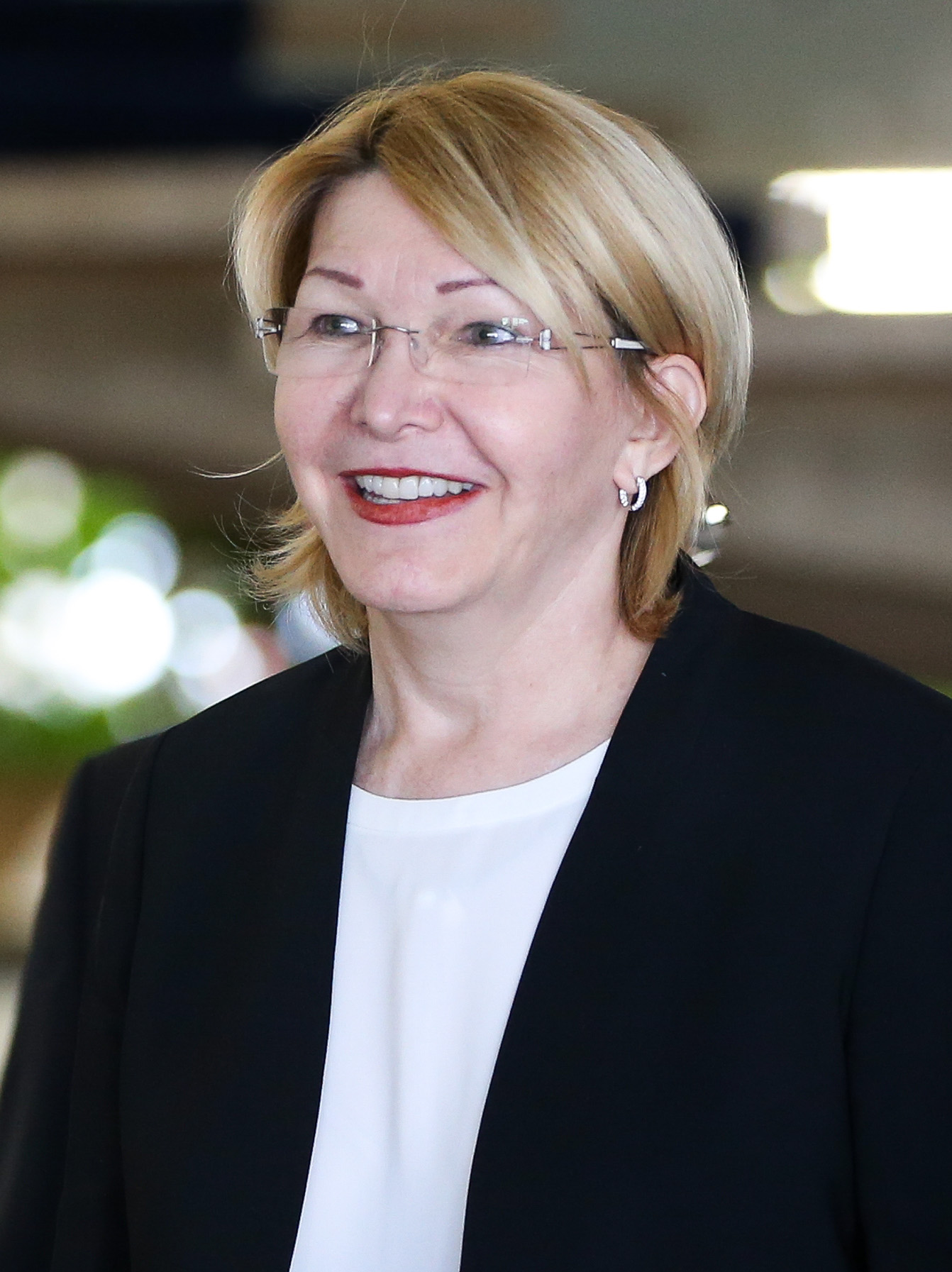
- Ortega in 2017

Prosecutor General of Venezuela
- In office 13 December 2007 – 5 August 2017
- Preceded by: Julián Isaías Rodríguez Diaz
- Succeeded by: Tarek William Saab

President of the Republican Moral Council
- In office 1 January 2014 – 1 January 2015
- Preceded by: Adelina González
- Succeeded by: Tarek William Saab

Personal details
- Born: Luisa Marvelia Ortega Díaz; 11 January 1958 (age 68) Valle de la Pascua, Guárico, Republic of Venezuela
- Education: University of Carabobo (LLB); Santa María University (PhD)
- Profession: Lawyer
- Website: luisaortegadiaz.com

Luisa Marvelia Ortega Díaz (born 11 January 1958) is a Venezuelan lawyer who served as Prosecutor General of Venezuela from 2007 to 2017. A supporter of Chavismo, she initially served under the government of Hugo Chávez and later under Nicolás Maduro, before breaking with the Maduro administration during the 2017 constitutional crisis.

On 5 August 2017, Ortega Díaz was removed from office by the Supreme Tribunal of Justice and the National Constituent Assembly, which was convened by Maduro. The opposition-led National Assembly rejected her dismissal, arguing that the removal violated the Venezuelan Constitution and that the legislature alone had the authority to remove the Prosecutor General. Subsequently, the National Assembly, the Supreme Tribunal of Justice of Venezuela in exile, and some media outlets continued to recognize her as Prosecutor General in exile. She retained this status until 31 December 2021, when she announced that she was stepping down from her duties.

== Early life and career ==
Ortega Díaz was born in Valle de la Pascua, in Guárico State, on 11 January 1958.

She graduated in law from the University of Carabobo and subsequently earned a doctorate in legal sciences, specializing in constitutional law, from Santa María University. She also obtained postgraduate specializations in procedural law from Andrés Bello Catholic University and criminal law from Santa María University.

In addition, she earned a master's degree in group dynamics from the Center for Research and Study of Social Dynamics (CIEDIS) and completed a diploma program in human rights at the Latin American and Caribbean University.

Ortega Díaz worked as a professor at the Antonio José de Sucre University Institute of Technology in Maracay and at the Maracay campus of the Libertador Experimental Pedagogical University, both in Aragua State. From 2003 to 2007, she also taught postgraduate courses in criminal procedural law at Santa María University. Additionally, she served as a legal consultant for Venezolana de Televisión, Venezuela's state-owned television broadcaster.

== Prosecutor General (2007–2017) ==
In April 2002, Ortega Díaz joined Venezuela's public prosecution service (Ministerio Público). She served as a prosecutor from 2002 to 2006 and subsequently as director general of procedural operations from 2006 until December 2007, when she was appointed Prosecutor General by the II National Assembly.

During her tenure under Nicolás Maduro, the Public Ministry pursued criminal proceedings against opposition leader Leopoldo López, including the issuance of arrest warrants and the filing of charges. Following her dismissal in 2017, Ortega Díaz alleged that she had been pressured by the government to bring fabricated charges against López.

In March 2017, Ortega Díaz publicly criticized decisions by the Supreme Tribunal of Justice that assumed powers constitutionally assigned to the National Assembly. The rulings, which were widely criticized domestically and internationally as an attempt to concentrate political power, prompted her to denounce what she described as a rupture of Venezuela's democratic order. Her criticism marked a significant break with the Maduro administration.

On 29 June 2017, the Supreme Tribunal of Justice prohibited Ortega Díaz from leaving Venezuela and ordered the freezing of her assets, citing alleged serious misconduct in office.

On 5 August 2017, the newly established National Constituent Assembly removed Ortega Díaz from her position as Prosecutor General.

== Later life ==
On 16 August 2017, Tarek William Saab, whom the National Constituent Assembly had appointed as her successor, accused Ortega Díaz and her husband, German Ferrer, of operating an extortion network. The following day, the Constituent Assembly ordered their arrest. Ortega Díaz and Ferrer subsequently left Venezuela for Colombia. Ferrer rejected the allegations, describing them as politically motivated.

The couple reportedly fled Venezuela by speedboat to Aruba, from where they traveled by air to Colombia. Ortega Díaz said she feared that the Maduro government would kill her, stating that it would "deprive me of my life".

In late August 2017, Maduro announced that his government was seeking international arrest warrants for Ortega Díaz and Ferrer, accusing them of involvement in serious crimes.

== See also ==
- Government of Venezuela
- María Lourdes Afiuni
