= Killing of David Vallenilla =

Venezuelan student killed during the 2017 protests

David José Vallenilla Luis (20 September 1994 – 22 June 2017) was a Venezuelan student killed during the 2017 Venezuelan protests.

== Killing ==
David Vallenilla being shot on 22 June.

David Vallenilla was a graduate student in nursing. Son of David Vallenilla, who was the superior of Nicolás Maduro when he worked in the Caracas Metro. On 22 June 2017, Vallenilla was in a protest on the Francisco Fajardo highway, in Caracas, when a military official fired a shotgun at him from inside the La Carlota air base. He was wounded at the thorax level and was transferred to the El Ávila clinic, where he was admitted without vital signs at the age of 22.

On 13 July, a night march was summoned in honor of those killed during the protests, including Vallenilla, marching to the places where the demonstrators died. Dissident CICPC inspector Óscar Pérez made a surprise appearance in the march, before leaving and disappearing.

The killing of David Vallenilla was documented in a report by a panel of independent experts from the Organization of American States, considering that it could constitute a crime against humanity committed in Venezuela along with other killings during the protests.

== See also ==
- Armando Cañizales
- Miguel Castillo
- Paúl Moreno
- Jairo Ortiz
- Juan Pablo Pernalete
- Paola Ramírez
- Xiomara Scott
- Fabián Urbina
- Timeline of the 2017 Venezuelan protests
