= Killing of Armando Cañizales =

Venezuelan violist killed during the 2017 protests

Armando Cañizales
- Born: c. 1999
- Died: 3 May 2017; Caracas, Venezuela
- Cause of death: Homicide; Spherical metallic projectile

Armando Cañizales Carrillo (c. 1999-3 May 2017) was a Venezuelan violist member of the National Symphony Orchestra System killed during the 2017 Venezuelan protests.

== Killing ==
Cañizales was going to start studying at the Central University of Venezuela Medicine School. On 3 May 2017, he was participating in a demonstration on Rio de Janeiro Avenue, in Las Mercedes urbanization, in Caracas, when he was shot at the base of his neck by a spherical metallic projectile, dying at the age of 18 years. Conductor Gustavo Dudamel condemned Maduro's response to the protests for the first time the day after the killing, writing in social media: "I raise my voice against violence and repression. Nothing can justify bloodshed. Enough of ignoring the just clamor of a people suffocated by an intolerable crisis."

On 13 July, a night march was summoned in honor of those killed during the protests, including Cañizales, marching to the places where the demonstrators died. Dissident CICPC inspector Óscar Pérez made a surprise appearance in the march, before leaving and disappearing.

The killing of Armando Cañizales was documented in a report by a panel of independent experts from the Organization of American States, considering that it could constitute a crime against humanity committed in Venezuela along with other killings during the protests.

== See also ==
- Miguel Castillo
- Paúl Moreno
- Jairo Ortiz
- Karen Palacios
- Juan Pablo Pernalete
- Neomar Lander
- Paola Ramírez
- Xiomara Scott
- Fabián Urbina
- David Vallenilla
- Timeline of the 2017 Venezuelan protests
