= Killing of Paola Ramírez =

Venezuelan student killed during the 2017 protests

Paola Ramírez
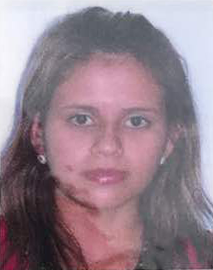
- Ramírez in 2017, one month before her murder
- Born: 26 July 1993
- Died: 19 April 2017 (aged 23); San Cristóbal, Venezuela
- Education: Catholic University of Tachira
- Occupation: Student

Paola Andreína Ramírez Gómez (26 July 1993 – 19 April 2017) was a Venezuelan student from the Catholic University of Tachira killed during the 2017 Venezuelan protests.

== Killing ==
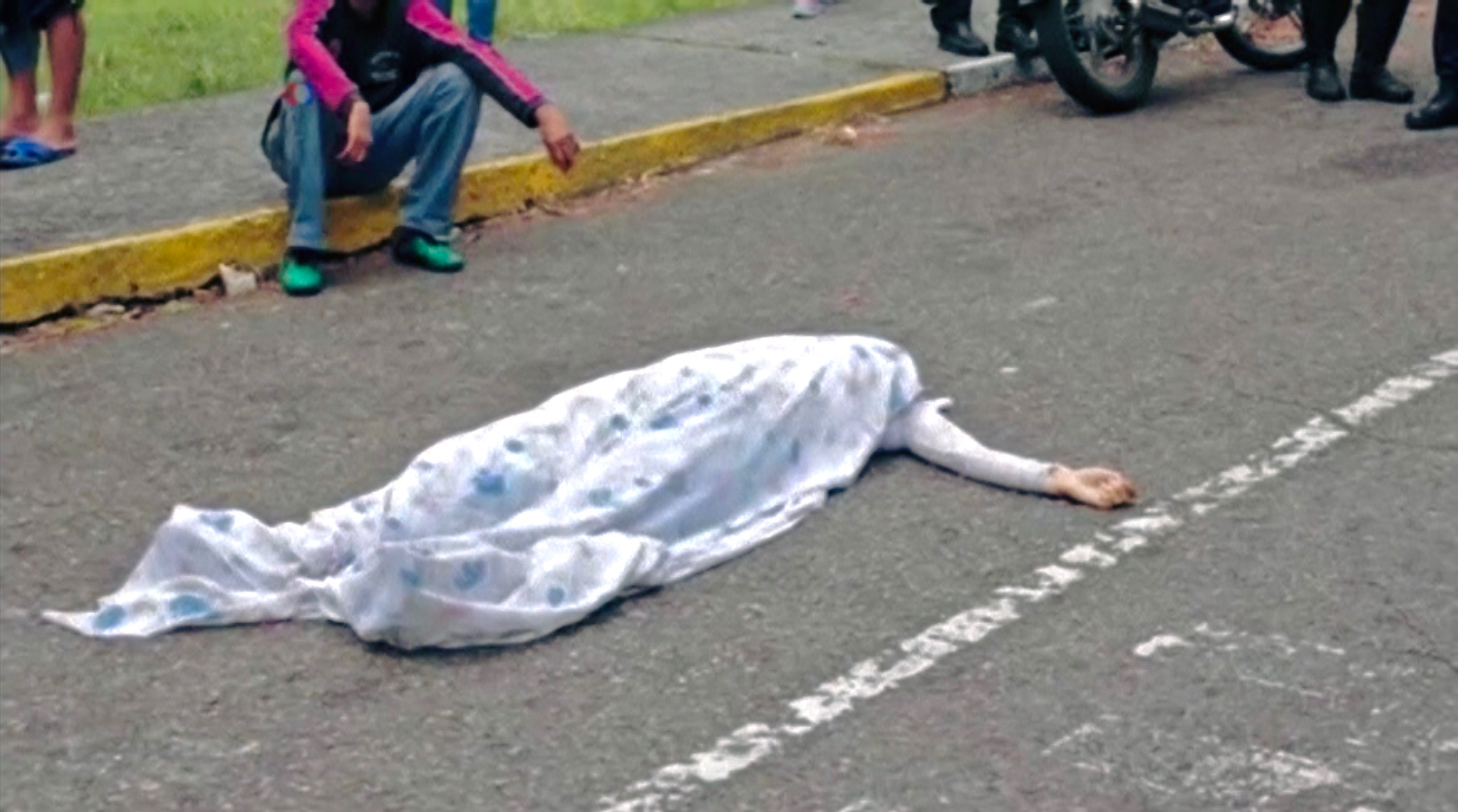
Ramírez's body on 19 April 2017

On 19 April 2017, Ramírez was nearby the Las Palomas Square in the San Carlos neighborhood in San Cristóbal, Táchira state, when she was intercepted by several armed civilians on motorcycles (also known as colectivos) that were patrolling the area due to the demonstrations that were taking place in the zone. They tried to rob Ramírez of her belongings. She fended them off and ran away. Her assailants chased her down and shot her in the thorax, puncturing her lung; she died shortly thereafter.

On 21 April, during her funeral, her parents were taken by the CICPC forensic police and interrogated following their comments that she had called them minutes before her death, stating that colectivos were pursuing her. Their testimony contrasted Interior Minister Néstor Reverol's statement, who said that a member of an opposition party killed Ramírez.

Ramírez's death was documented in a report by a panel of independent experts from the Organization of American States, considering that it could constitute a crime against humanity committed in Venezuela along with other killings during the protests.

== See also ==
- Crisis in Venezuela
- Armando Cañizales
- Miguel Castillo
- Neomar Lander
- Paúl Moreno
- Jairo Ortiz
- Juan Pablo Pernalete
- Xiomara Scott
- Fabián Urbina
- David Vallenilla
- Timeline of the 2017 Venezuelan protests
