= Tarek William Saab =

Venezuelan lawyer and politician (born 1962)

- Saab in 2025

Ombudsman of Venezuela
- In office 25 February 2026 – 9 April 2026
- Preceded by: Alfredo Ruiz
- Succeeded by: Eglée González
- In office 22 December 2014 – 5 August 2017
- Preceded by: Gabriela Ramírez
- Succeeded by: Alfredo Ruiz

Prosecutor General of Venezuela
- In office 5 August 2017 – 25 February 2026
- Appointed by: National Constituent Assembly
- Preceded by: Luisa Ortega Díaz
- Succeeded by: Larry Devoe

President of the Republican Moral Council
- In office 16 December 2023 – 6 April 2026
- Preceded by: Elvis Amoroso
- Succeeded by: Larry Devoe
- In office 1 January 2017 – 7 February 2019
- Preceded by: Manuel Galindo Ballesteros
- Succeeded by: Elvis Amoroso
- In office 1 January 2015 – 1 January 2016
- Preceded by: Luisa Ortega Díaz
- Succeeded by: Manuel Galindo Ballesteros

Governor of Anzoátegui
- In office 31 October 2004 – 28 December 2012
- Preceded by: David De Lima
- Succeeded by: Aristóbulo Istúriz

Deputy to the National Assembly for Anzoátegui State
- In office 30 July 2000 – 31 October 2004

Member of the Chamber of Deputies for the Capital District
- In office 23 January 1999 – 22 December 1999

Personal details
- Born: Tarek William Saab Halabi; 10 September 1962 (age 64) El Tigre, Anzoátegui, Republic of Venezuela
- Party: Fifth Republic Movement (MVR) (before 2007); United Socialist Party of Venezuela (PSUV) (from 2007)
- Education: Central University of Venezuela; Universidad Santa María
- Profession: Politician, lawyer, author

Tarek William Saab Halabi (Spanish pronunciation: [taˈɾek 'wiljam ˈsaːβ], Arabic: طارق وليام صعب حلبي; born 10 September 1962) is a Venezuelan politician, lawyer, and poet who served as Prosecutor General of Venezuela from 2017 to 2026. A member of the United Socialist Party of Venezuela, he previously served as governor of Anzoátegui from 2004 to 2012 and as Ombudsman from 2014 to 2017. He was a prominent leader of the Fifth Republic Movement, founded by Hugo Chávez, who referred to him as the "poet of the revolution".

On 5 August 2017, the National Constituent Assembly appointed Saab Prosecutor General, replacing Luisa Ortega Díaz. He resigned on 25 February 2026 after nearly nine years in office and was subsequently appointed acting Ombudsman by the National Assembly.

== Early life and education ==
Tarek William Saab was born on 10 September 1962 into a family of Lebanese merchants. He began his law school studies in 1985 at Santa Maria University, but for undisclosed reasons he did not graduate in the regular five years (his class graduated in 1990). He graduated as an attorney in 1992.

== Career ==
After Hugo Chavez took office he was a member of the Constituent Assembly that drafted in 1999 the Constitution of the Bolivarian Republic of Venezuela. In 2000, he was elected a member of the Venezuelan National Assembly.

During the coup d'état of April 2002, Saab was imprisoned by security forces after a crowd of protesters had gathered around Saab's home, threatening him and his family. He was held incommunicado for several hours.

In October 2002, Saab was head of the foreign policy commission of Venezuela's National Assembly, and was refused an entry visa to the United States. Reuters reported that Saab told local television he had been denied the visa because a U.S. State Department report "identified him as 'an individual linked to international subversion'". According to Venezuela's El Universal, Saab said he been denied the visa because of alleged ties with international terrorist organizations, which he denied any association with. Saab is an outspoken critic of Israel. He is also a outspoken critic of Jair Bolsonaro and former political ally of Nicolas Maduro, Luiz Inácio Lula da Silva and the former president of Chile, Gabriel Boric, after Lula and Boric openly criticized the transparency of the 2024 Venezuelan elections.

=== Governor of Anzoátegui ===
Anzoátegui State governor election, 2004 results
Source: CNE data

Candidates	Votes	%
Tarek W. Saab	187,209	57%
Antonio Barreto	138,120	42%

Saab was elected governor of Anzoátegui in the 2004 regional elections, and re-elected in 2008.

In 2005 Saab was accused by critics within his own party (MVR) of participating in electoral fraud in the primary elections for 2005 local elections. His predecessor as governor of Anzoátegui, David de Lima, accused Saab of using his position for political persecution, after Saab's wife accused De Lima of mismanagement.

=== Ombudsman ===
In 2014, Saab was elected to the post of ombudsman (Defensor del Pueblo) by the parliament, for a term of seven years, with opposition considering the election unlawful on procedural grounds. During the 2014 Venezuelan protests, Saab was criticized by the opposition because it believed he sided with the government during the protests. The Washington Post stated that the opposition viewed him as "an apologist for the unpopular government of President Nicolás Maduro".

=== Attorney general ===
On 5 August 2017 the National Constituent Assembly appointed him attorney general after former Prosecutor General Luisa Ortega Díaz was removed from office for allegedly being part of the "counterrevolution". This occurred months after Saab stated himself that he had "no gut, no encouragement, no willingness to be Attorney General" and that he wanted to be prosecutor "not yesterday, not today, not tomorrow".

On 14 June 2018, the National Constituent Assembly appointed Saab as president of the Truth Commission, considering the appointment of the constituent Delcy Rodríguez as Venezuela's vice-president.

On 2 February 2023, the National Bolivarian Police of Nueva Esparta state arrested two men implicated in an assassination attempt on several high-ranking officials of the Public Prosecutor's Office, including Saab, whose foiled attempt had been ordered by Jhonatan Marín, a former mayor of Guanta municipality, accused of corruption in Venezuela and convicted of bribery in the United States.

In April 2023, Saab said 51 people had been detained in connection with a corruption investigation at the state oil company PDVSA and the metal conglomerate Corporacion Venezolana de Guayana (CVG).

During its 2023 annual report before the United Nations Human Rights Committee, experts questioned William Saab's independence. One of its members, Juan Manuel Santos Pais, remarked: "I have never seen a prosecutor defend a government so much."

Saab resigned as attorney-general on 25 February 2026, but was immediately appointed as interim Ombudsman by the National Assembly following the resignation of Alfredo Ruiz.

On 9 April 2026, the National Assembly confirmed Larry ‌Devoe, a close ally of interim President Delcy Rodriguez, as the new attorney general to succeed Saab.

== Sanctions ==
In July 2017, the United States Treasury sanctioned thirteen senior officials of the Venezuelan government, including Saab, associated with the 2017 Venezuelan Constituent Assembly elections for what the Treasury describe as their role in undermining democracy and human rights. Tarek William Saab has been sanctioned by several countries and is banned from entering neighboring Colombia. The Colombian government maintains a list of people banned from entering Colombia or subject to expulsion; as of January 2019, the list had 200 people with a "close relationship and support for the Nicolás Maduro regime".

In September 2017 Canada sanctioned 40 Venezuelan officials, including Saab. Canada said the sanctions were "in response to the government of Venezuela's deepening descent into dictatorship". Canadians were banned from transactions with the 40 individuals, whose Canadian assets were frozen.

On 18 January 2018, the European Union sanctioned seven Venezuela officials, including Saab, and accused them of human rights abuses or breaching the rule of law. The sanctioned individuals were prohibited from entering the nations of the European Union, and their assets were frozen.

In March 2018, Panama sanctioned 55 public officials, including Saab.

On 20 April 2018, the Mexican Senate froze the assets of officials of the Maduro administration, including Saab, and prohibited them from entering Mexico.

== Literary work ==
Saab began writing poetry at the age of fourteen, when he studied at the Liceo Briceño Méndez in El Tigre, Anzoátegui, publishing poems in the Antorcha newspaper of that city. In the 1980s, his poems reached the pages of Papel Literario de El Nacional. The American poets of the beat generation such as Jack Kerouac, Allen Ginsberg and the hippie counterculture movement were influential in the beginnings of Saab's poetry, as were his readings of the German novelist Hermann Hesse.

In 1993 he was selected by a jury to represent Venezuela at the "Foro Literatura y Compromiso" (Literature and Commitment Forum) held in Mollina/Malaga (Spain).

His book "Los Niños del Infortunio" was written after he was invited by Cuban President Fidel Castro, during an interview in Havana in 2005, to visit the Cuban medical mission in Pakistan. It was presented at the Cuban capital's book fair the following year, in the presence of Castro and Hugo Chávez. Chávez dubbed him "el poeta de la revolución" (the poet of the revolution).

=== Books ===
Saab has written numerous publications, including Los ríos de la Ira (1987), El Hacha de los Santos (1992), Príncipe de Lluvia y Duelo (1992), Al Fatah (México, 1994), Angel Caído Angel (1998), Cielo a Media Asta (2003), Cuando Pasen las Carretas (2003), Poemas selectos (Colombia, 2005), Los niños del infortunio (Cuba, 2006. China, 2007), Memorias de Gulan Rubani (Caracas, 2007), Un paisaje boreal (Valencia, 2008. Caracas, 2009), Hoguera de una adolescencia intemporal (Caracas, 2022).
