= Public Ministry of Venezuela =

Venezuelan government department

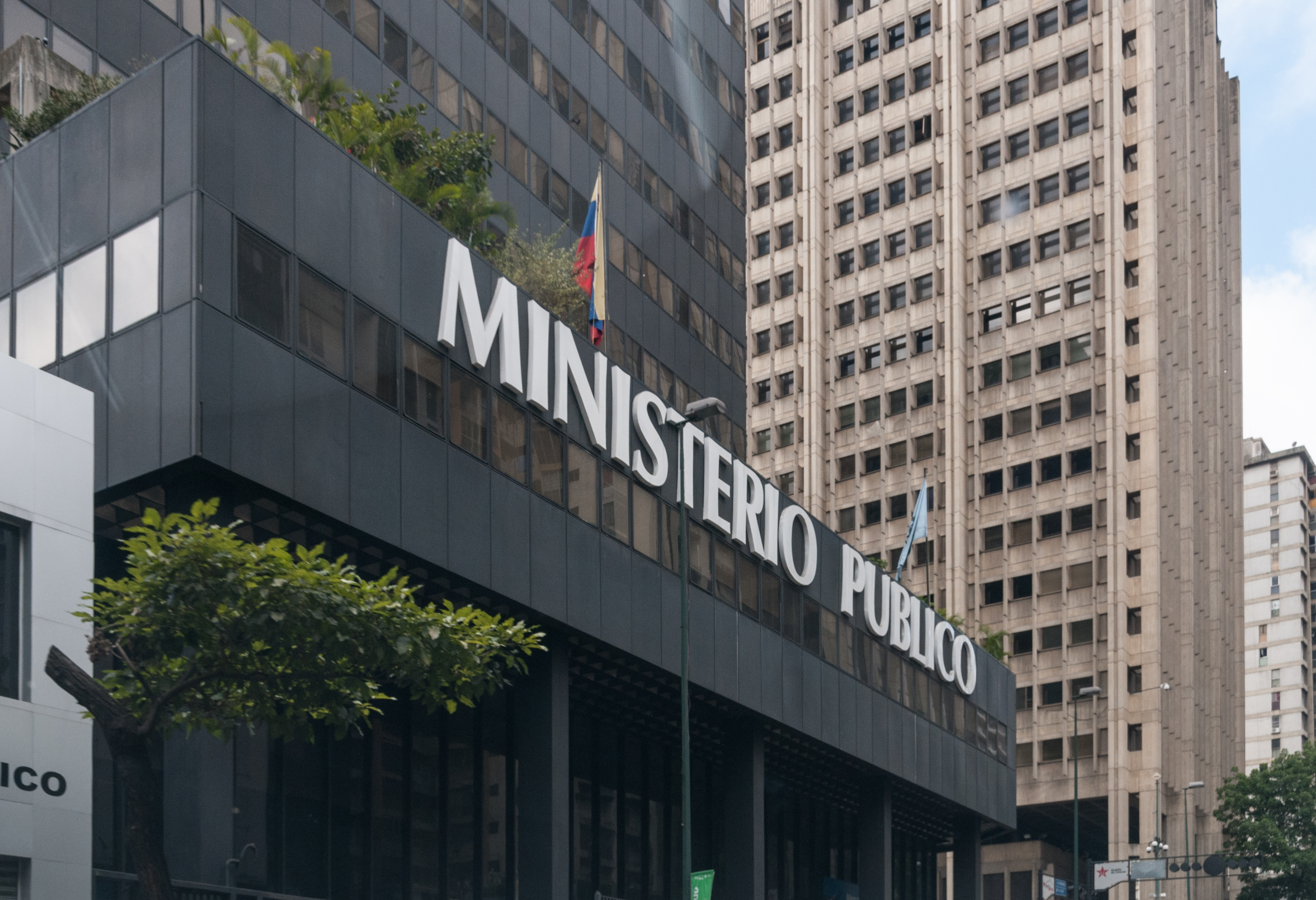
View of Public ministry in Caracas

The Public Ministry of Venezuela is an organ belonging to Citizen Power that has autonomous and independent character. It is under the direction of the Attorney General of the Republic who is elected by the National Assembly for a single period of seven years, as set out by Article 280 of the Constitution of Venezuela.

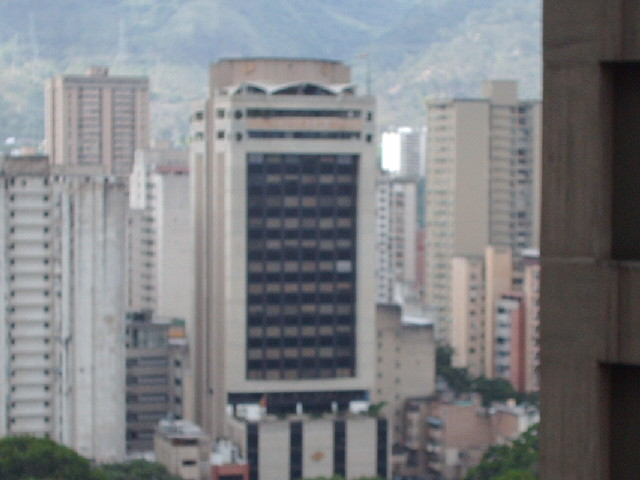
Building of the Public Ministry in Caracas-Candelaria parish.

Article 285 of the Constitution of Venezuela states that the Attorney General has the following function:

- Contribute to the establishment of criteria of criminal policy or prosecution within the State, in light of the guiding principles of modern criminal law.
- Exercise criminal proceedings on behalf of the State.
- Guarantee respect for constitutional rights and guarantees in judicial processes.
- Ensure the efficiency and efficacy of the administration of justice, the preliminary trial period, and due process.
- Overlook the treaties, conventions and international agreements signed by the Republic with regard to criminal matters.
- Carry out any necessary actions to enforce the liability of public officials.
- Order and direct the criminal investigation of the perpetration of punishable offences.
- Protect victims and witnesses of punishable offences.
- Represent the interests of society by exercising the powers to direct the investigation of facts that may constitute a crime.

== History ==
As stated in the historical review of the Public Ministry, at the colonial times the role of Attorney General was exercised by an official appointed by the Monarchy of Spain, whose task was to ensure compliance with the Spanish Law in the Captaincy General of Venezuela.

The figure of Attorney General was established after the independence processes that gave rise to the Venezuelan nation were brought forward in 1819, within the framework of the Republic's origin. The role was instated to be in charge of ensuring the compliance and application of the legal order.

Later, in 1830, the Constitution of the Gran Colombia would establish the Public Ministry as an organ dependent on the Executive Branch, by means of the Attorney General of the Republic. It was not until 1901 that the Constitution of the United States of Venezuela established the Public Ministry, in charge of the Attorney General of the Nation, differentiating its functions from those corresponding to the Judicial Power.

In 1935, President Isaías Medina Angarita enacted the Organic Law of the Public Ministry, appointing the Attorney General to its direction. Later, in 1948, the National Congress reformed said the law and appointed Fernando Álvarez Manosalva as General Prosecutor. In 1953, with the arrival of dictator Marcos Pérez Jiménez, the functions of the Public Prosecutor's Office were once again relegated to the Attorney General's Office. However, following the ousting of Perez in 1961, the Constitution of the Republic of Venezuela would go on to establish the Public Ministry as an autonomous institution, independent of the other branches of government, headed by the Attorney General of the Republic.

With the entry into force of the Constitution of the Bolivarian Republic of Venezuela (Constitution), the Citizen Power is created, which is exercised by the Republican Moral Council, made up of the Attorney General of the Republic, the Ombudsman and the Comptroller General of the Republic. Simultaneously, their autonomy is established.

=== Attorney Generals of Venezuela ===
Prosecutors General of Venezuela
Order	Name	Period
1	Fernando Álvarez Manosalva	1948
2	Pablo Ruggieri Parra	1961
3	Rolando Salcedo Delima	1961 - 1964
4	Antonio José Lozada	1964 - 1969
5	César Naranjo Ostty	1969 - 1974
6	José Ramón Medina	1974 - 1979
7	Pedro J. Mantellini González	1979 - 1984
8	Héctor Serpa Arcas	1984 - 1989
9	Ramón Escovar Salom	1989 - 1994
10	Iván Darío Badell González	1994 - 1999
11	Rafael Pérez Perdomo	1999
12	Javier Elechiguerra Naranjo	1999 - 2000
13	Julián Isaías Rodríguez Diaz	2000 - 2007
14	Luisa Ortega Díaz	2007 - 2017
15	Tarek William Saab	2017 - 2026
16	Larry Devoe	2026-

== Controversy ==
In 2017, the Supreme Court of Justice, at the request of Pedro Carreño, initiated legal proceedings that culminated in the dismissal of Luisa Ortega Díaz as Attorney General, a procedure that constitutionally can only be carried out by the National Assembly. On August 5, the National Constituent Assembly, promoted by Nicolás Maduro, appointed Tarek William Saab as head of the Public Ministry. Ortega Díaz disregarded the ruling and ignored the appointment of Saab, choosing to go into exile in Bogotá, Colombia and continue to uphold her position. Several deputies of the National Assembly expressed their support for Ortega Díaz. Luis Almagro, Secretary General of the Organization of American States (OAS), amongst several other world leaders and prosecutors, rejected the dismissal of Ortega Díaz. In February 2026, Venezuela's Attorney General Tarek William Saab resigned.

== Anthem of the Public Ministry ==
Lyrics: Nery Carballo
Music: Michel Eustache

Spanish

Coro
Soy guardián de un anhelo que avanza,
con firmeza y audacia tenaz,
a construir la patriótica alianza
de la ley con el Pueblo y la Paz.

I
La justicia formó mi conciencia
para un noble y sagrado ideal:
Defender del Derecho la esencia
en el Orden Constitucional.

II
Oh, Simón del civismo radiante.
Oh, Bolívar de la Libertad:
Sea tu vida el ejemplo constante
que ilumine la legalidad...

III
Cuando enfrenta al poder mi camino,
el honor es mi espada y mi escuela,
pues mi afán tiene un solo destino
y una sola razón: ¡ VENEZUELA !...

English

Chorus
I am the guardian of a longing that moves,
with firm and tenacious courage,
to build the patriotic alliance
of the law with the People and Peace.

I
Justice formed my conscience
for a noble and sacred ideal:
Defend the RLawthe essence
in the Constitutional Order.

II
Oh, Simón of the radiant citizenship.
Oh, Bolívar of the Liberty:
Your life Be a constant example
that illuminates the legality ...

III
When faced to power my way,
honor is my sword and my school,
because my eagerness has only one destination
and one reason only: VENEZUELA!...

== See also ==
- Politics of Venezuela
