= 2017 Venezuelan protests =

Protests in Venezuela against Nicolás Maduro's political oppression of the opposition

- Part of Protests against Nicolás Maduro
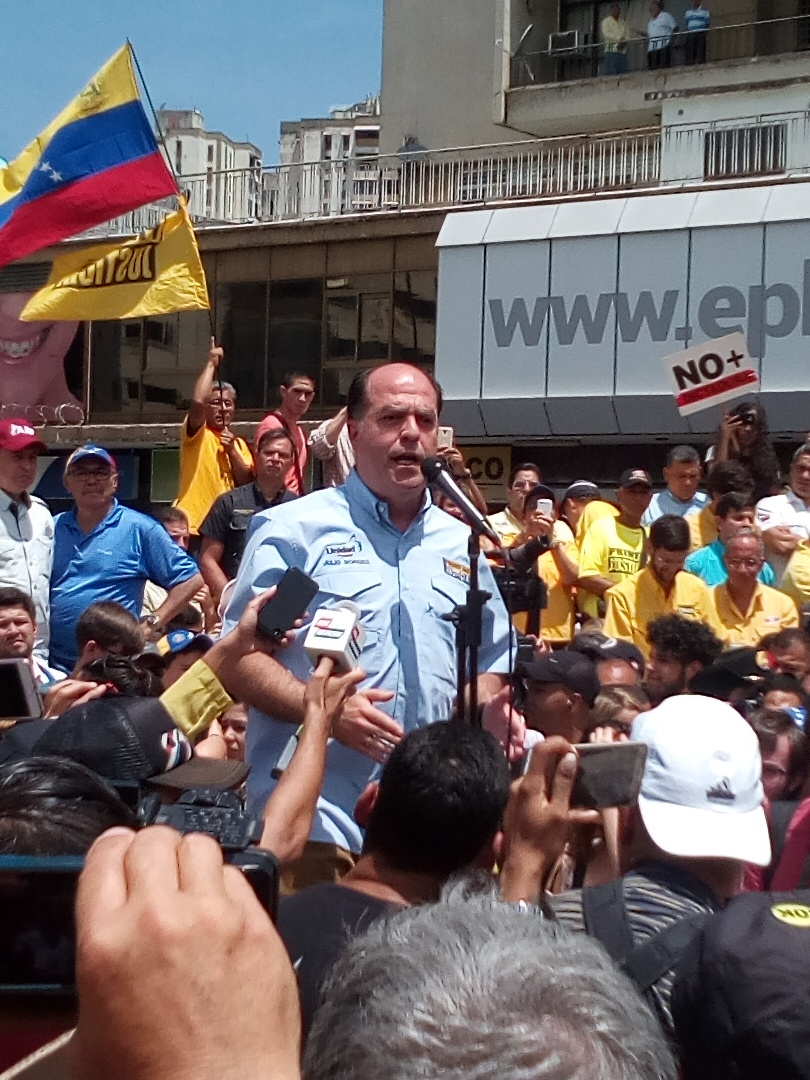
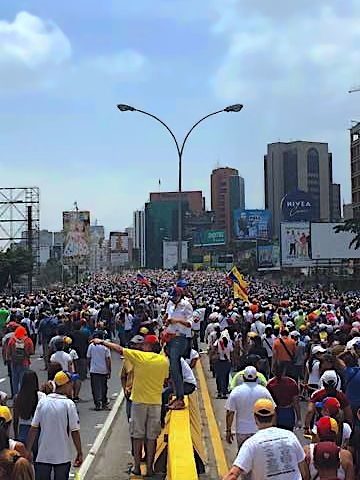
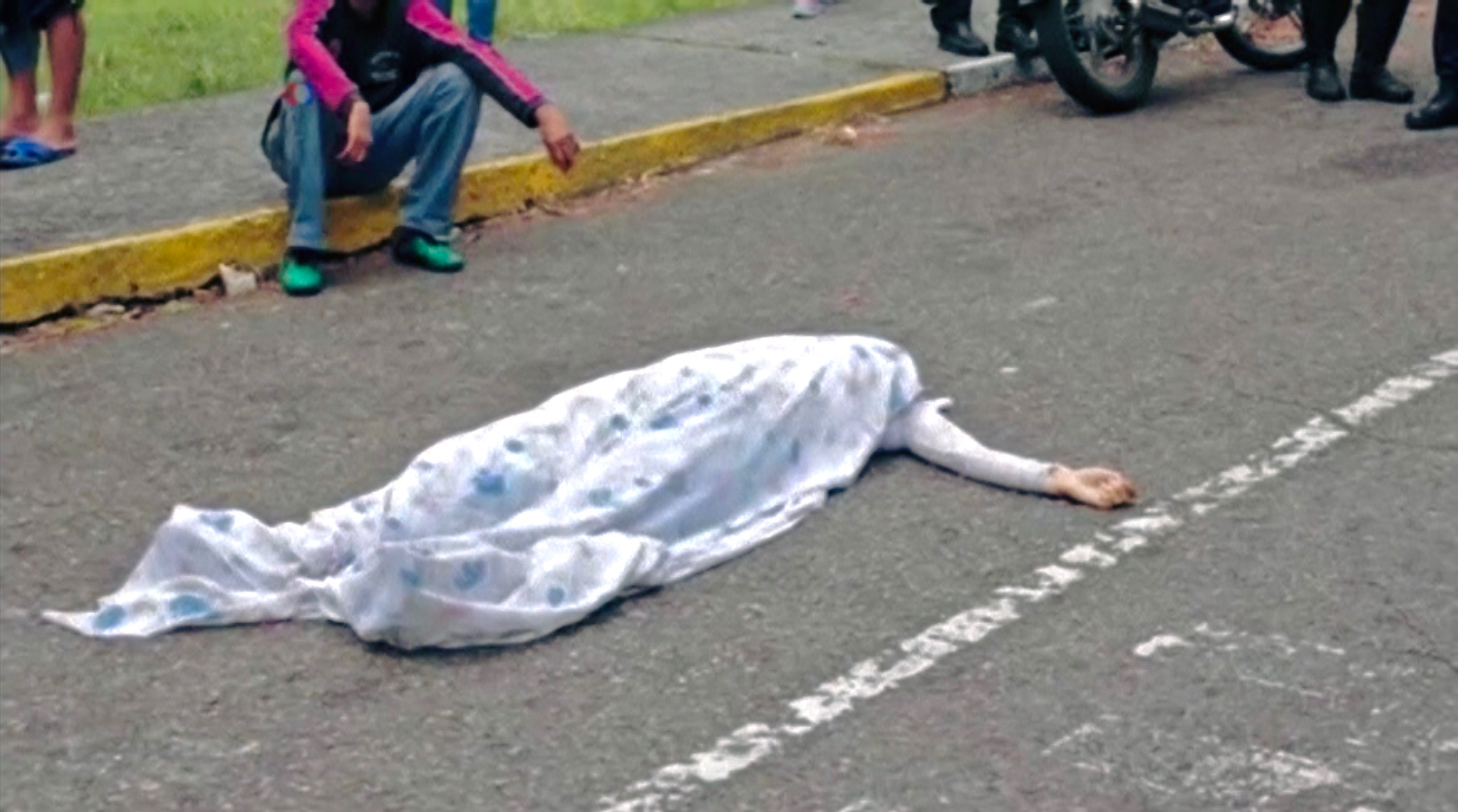
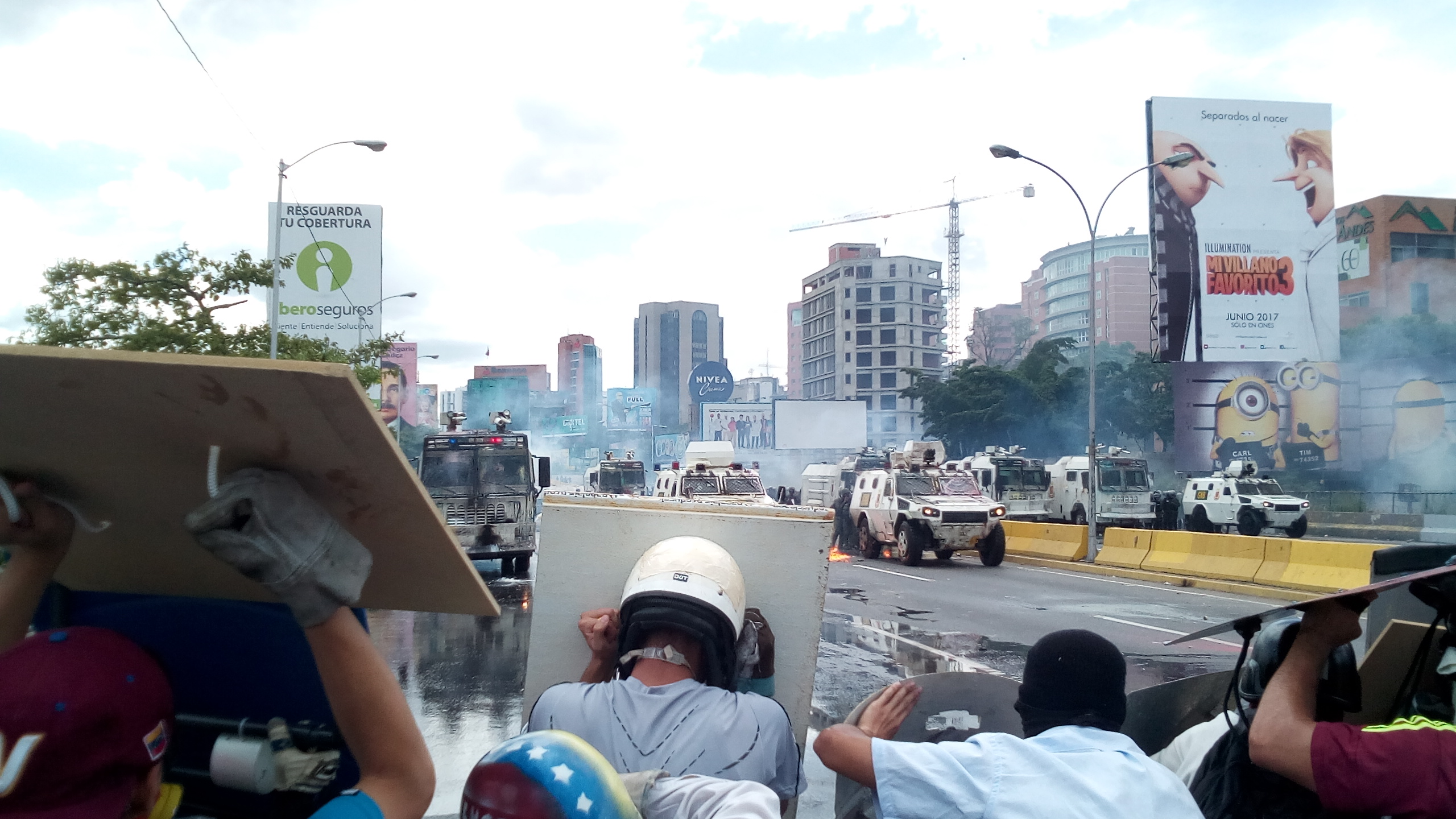
- Top to bottom, left to right: Julio Borges speaking on 1 April following the 2017 Venezuelan constitutional crisis. Millions gather during the Mother of All Marches on Francisco Fajardo Freeway. Paola Ramírez, a demonstrator killed by colectivos on 19 April. Protestors facing National Guard armored vehicles
- Date: 31 March 2017—12 August 2017 (134 days); December 2017 (sporadic)
- Location: Venezuela
- Result: 2017 Constituent National Assembly established; Disillusionment of protest movement

Parties
Venezuelan opposition: National Assembly (majority); Supreme Tribunal of Justice of Venezuela in exile; Democratic Unity Roundtable; Popular Will; Justice First; A New Era; Democratic Action; Copei; Movimiento Estudiantil (Student opposition organization); Resistencia (Protest defense groups); The Binary Guardians	Government of Venezuela; Supreme Tribunal of Justice; National Electoral Council; Bolivarian Armed Forces; National Guard; Militia; National Police; Bolivarian National Intelligence Service; Great Patriotic Pole; United Socialist Party of Venezuela; Communist Party of Venezuela; People's Electoral Movement; Tupamaro; Pro-government groups: Chavists; Colectivos

Lead figures
Leopoldo López; Freddy Guevara; Henry Ramos Allup; María Corina Machado; Henrique Capriles; Julio Borges; Lilian Tintori; Juan Requesens; Rafaela Requesens; Luisa Ortega Díaz; Óscar Alberto Pérez; Juan Caguaripano; Juan Pablo Guanipa; Tomás Guanipa; Stalin González; Juan Andrés Mejía; Dinorah Figuera	Nicolás Maduro; Tareck El Aissami; Diosdado Cabello; Vladimir Padrino López; Luisa Ortega Díaz (defected); Tarek William Saab; Ernesto Villegas; Néstor Reverol; Maikel Moreno; Tibisay Lucena

Number
Mother of All Marches; 6 million (Nationally): 2.5 million (Caracas); Hundreds of thousands (Daily)	Thousands

Casualties
- Deaths: 165
- Injuries: 15,000+
- Arrested: 4,848

The 2017 Venezuelan protests were a series of protests occurring throughout Venezuela. Protests began in January 2017 after the arrest of multiple opposition leaders and the cancellation of dialogue between the opposition and Nicolás Maduro's government.

As the tension continued, the 2017 Venezuelan constitutional crisis began in late March when the pro-government Supreme Tribunal of Justice (TSJ) dissolved the opposition-led National Assembly, with the intensity of protests increasing greatly throughout Venezuela following the decision. As April arrived, the protests grew "into the most combative since a wave of unrest in 2014" resulting from the crisis with hundreds of thousands of Venezuelans protesting daily through the month and into May. After failing to prevent the July Constituent Assembly election, the opposition and protests largely lost momentum.

== Background ==
Late-2015 video of Venezuelans eating from garbage.

Following the death of President Hugo Chávez, Venezuela faced a severe socioeconomic crisis during the presidency of his successor, Nicolás Maduro, as a result of Chávez's policies and Maduro's continuation of them. Due to the country's high levels of urban violence, inflation, and chronic shortages of basic goods attributed to economic policies such as strict price controls, civil insurrection in Venezuela culminated in the 2014–17 protests.

Protests occurred over the years, with demonstrations occurring in various intensities depending on the crises Venezuelans were facing at the time and the perceived threat of being repressed by authorities.

Due to the discontent with the Bolivarian government, the opposition was elected to hold the majority in the National Assembly for the first time since 1999, following the 2015 parliamentary election. As a result of that election, the lame duck National Assembly, consisting of government officials, filled the TSJ with allies.

Into early 2016, the TSJ alleged that voting irregularities occurred in the 2015 parliamentary elections and stripped four lawmakers of their seats, preventing an opposition supermajority in the National Assembly which would be able to challenge President Maduro. The TSJ court then began to approve of multiple actions performed by Maduro and granted him more powers.

After facing years of crisis, the Venezuelan opposition pursued a recall referendum against President Maduro, presenting a petition to the National Electoral Council (CNE) on May 2, 2016. By August 2016, the momentum to recall President Maduro appeared to be progressing as the CNE set a date for the second phase of collecting signatures. Though it made the schedule strenuous, stretching the process into 2017 made it impossible for the opposition to activate new presidential elections.

On 21 October 2016, the CNE suspended the referendum only days before preliminary signature-gatherings were to be held.

The CNE blamed alleged voter fraud as the reason for the cancellation of the referendum. International observers criticized the move, stating that CNE's decision made Maduro look as if he were seeking to rule as a dictator.

Days after the recall movement was cancelled, 1.2 million Venezuelans protested throughout the country against the move, demanding President Maduro to leave office. Caracas protests remained calm while protests in other states resulted in clashes between demonstrators and authorities, leaving one policeman dead, 120 injured and 147 arrested. That day the opposition gave President Maduro a deadline of 3 November 2016 to hold elections, with opposition leader Henrique Capriles stating, "Today we are giving a deadline to the government. I tell the coward who is in Miraflores ... that on 3 November the Venezuelan people are coming to Caracas because we are going to Miraflores".

Days later on 1 November 2016, then National Assembly President and opposition leader Henry Ramos Allup announced the cancellation of the 3 November march to the Miraflores presidential palace, with Vatican-led dialogue between the opposition and the government beginning.

By 7 December 2016, dialogue halted between the two and two months later on 13 January 2017 after talks stalled, the Vatican officially pulled out of the dialogue.

== Timeline ==
Protests were originally much smaller in the early months of 2017 due to the fear of repression. The first large protest to occur in 2017 was on 23 January 2017, with several thousand Venezuelans participating. Following that day of protest, opposition leader Henrique Capriles stated that only surprise protests would occur for the meantime.

The following day, the first surprise demonstration occurred with only hundreds of Venezuelans attending, blocking the Francisco Fajardo highway in both directions holding a sign saying "Elections now", with Venezuelan authorities not being able to respond until an hour later when the protest was peacefully broken up. There were no other surprise protests to follow.

=== Constitutional crisis ===
Students protesting against rulings outside of the TSJ on 31 March 2017.

On 29 March 2017, the 2017 Venezuelan constitutional crisis began, with immunity being taken away from opposition parliamentarians by the Supreme Tribunal of Justice of Venezuela (TSJ), with the TSJ assuming legislative powers of the opposition-controlled National Assembly. Days later, the Supreme Court reversed its decision on 1 April, though the opposition argued that the juridic action was still a "coup". Protests following the constitutional crisis grew "into the most combative since a wave of unrest in 2014". Weeks later on 14 April 2017, the opposition announced the "Grand March and Great Taking in All States", later known as the "Mother of All Marches", to take place on 19 April to "overflow" Caracas.

=== Mother of All Marches ===
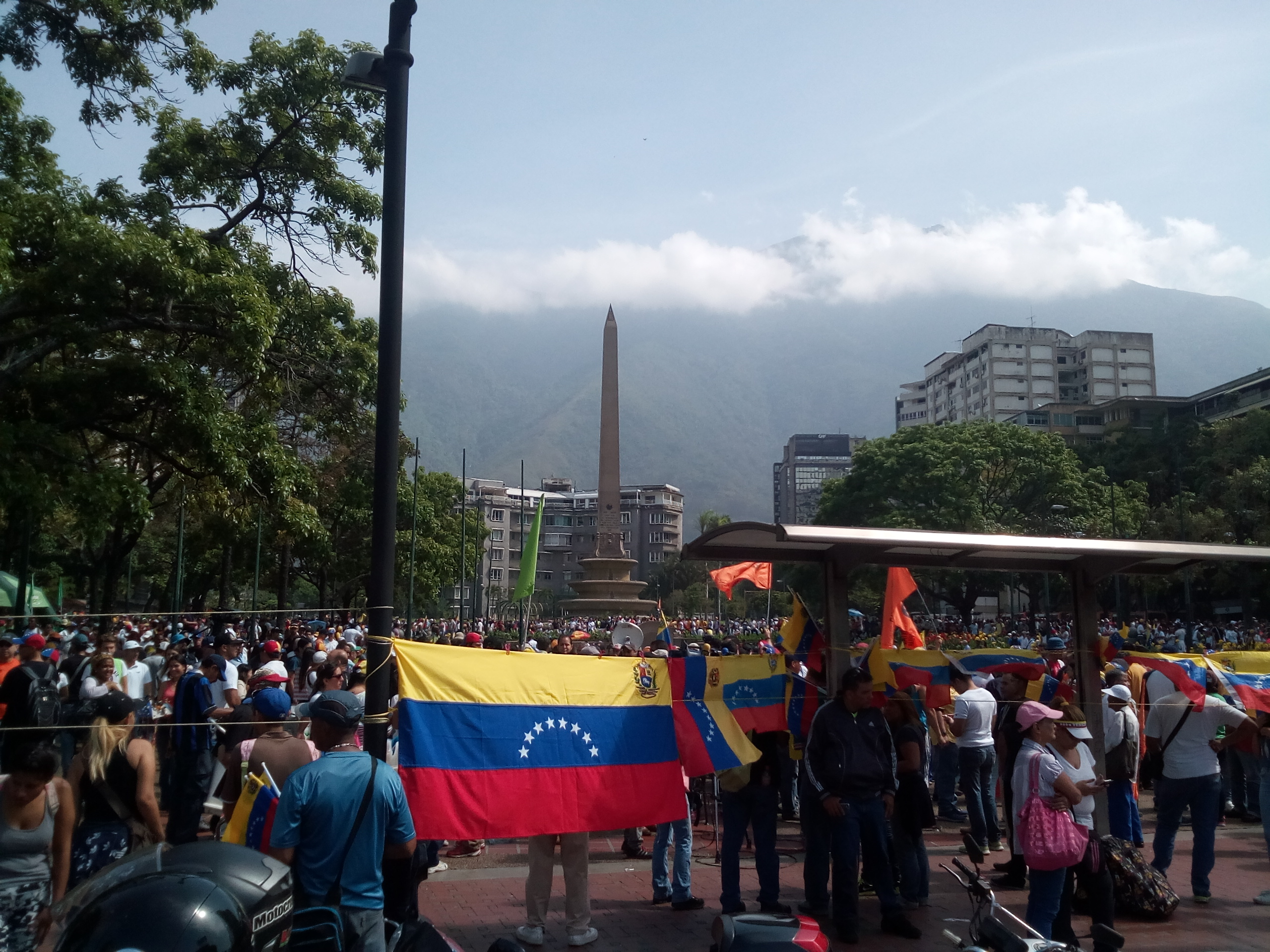
Altamira Square, one of the meeting points of the Mother of All Marches.

On 19 April 2017, the "mother of all protests", as it was called by organizers, occurred. The day began with demonstrators gathering around the country at about 10:30 a.m., with Caracas having 26 different routes for the main march to head to the office of the Ombudsman to demonstrate. As the march progressed through Caracas, the National Guard began to block routes and fire tear gas at marchers at 11:50 a.m., with the demonstrators refusing to leave despite the use of force. At about 12:30 p.m., demonstrations by both opposition and pro-government Venezuelans fill Caracas' avenues. Shortly after 12:45 p.m., protesters on the Francisco Fajardo Freeway near Bello Monte begin to flee the area after enduring over an hour of tear gas from authorities, with many leaping into the Guaire River, which is used for sewage drainage, to avoid the gas. Near 2:10 p.m., a 17-year-old boy was shot in the head and killed at a protest.

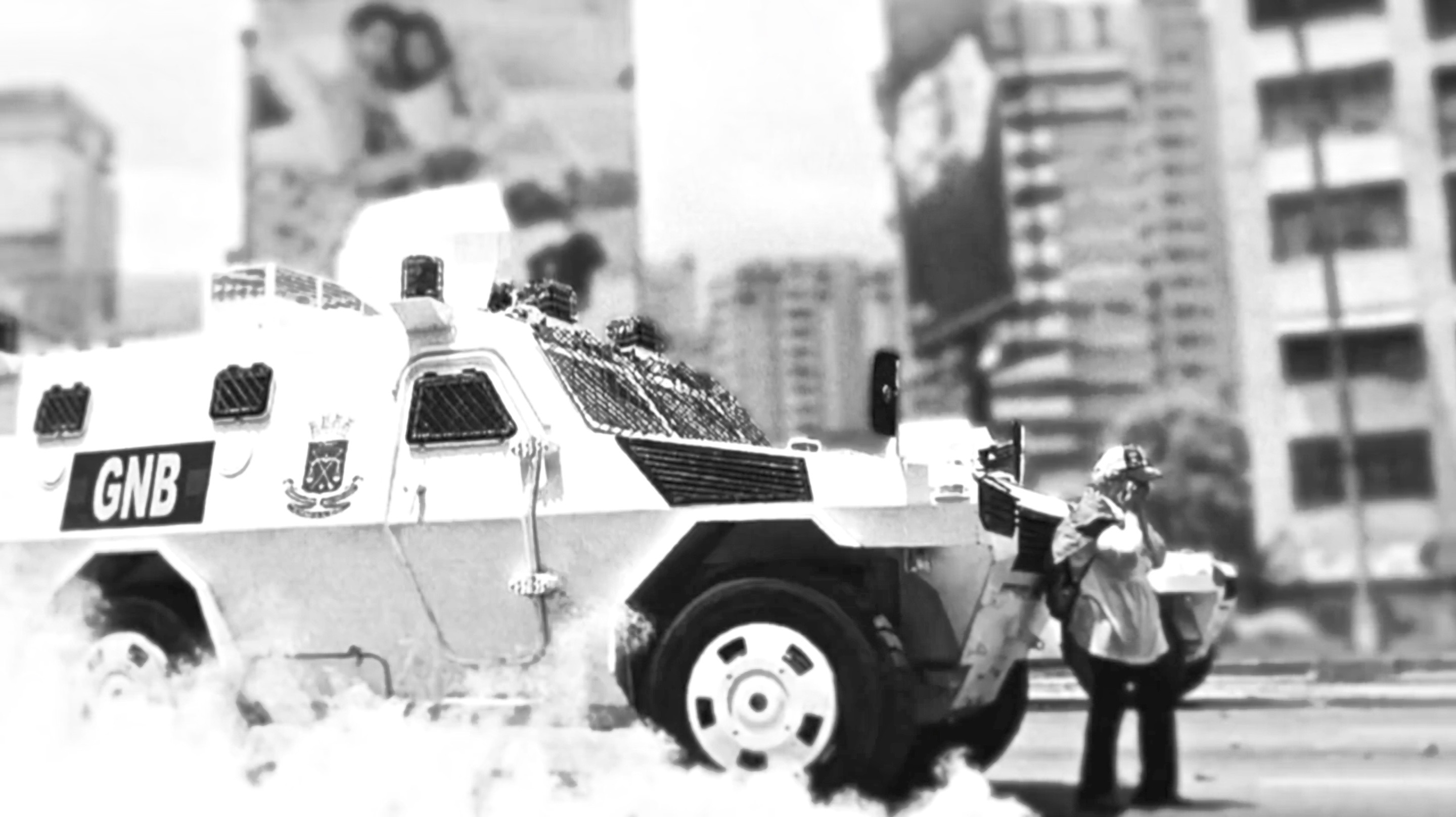
The "Tank Woman", who prevented VN-4s from repressing protesters

At about 4:35 p.m., pro-government paramilitaries called colectivos shot and killed Paola Ramírez, a 23-year-old woman who was protesting. Later in the evening, a National Guardsman was killed south of Caracas, the first authority killed in the year's protests, with the day's deaths raising the death toll of the 2017 protests to at least 8 people. By 9:00 p.m., the Penal Forum stated that 521 Venezuelans had been arrested throughout the day, bringing the number of total arrests since the beginning of the year to over 1,000. Several media outlets stated "hundreds of thousands" participated while Central University mathematics professor Ricardo Rios estimated at least 1.2 million protested, which would make it the largest protest in Venezuela's history. According to pollster Meganálisis, 2.5 million Venezuelans protested in Caracas alone, while 6 million protested throughout the country.

=== OAS withdrawal ===
The government began efforts to withdraw from the Organization of American States, a two-year process, on 26 April 2017, after multiple member states called for a special session to discuss Venezuela's crisis.

Following the death of a student the same day, the son of Ombudsman Tarek Saab, Yibram Saab, uploaded a video on YouTube stating that he had protested that night and that "That could've been me!", condemning what he called "the brutal repression by the country's security forces", and pleading to his father saying "Dad, in this moment you have the power to end the injustice that has sunk this country. I ask you as your son and in the name of Venezuela, to whom you serve, that you reflect on the situation and do what you have to do".

=== Constituent assembly proposal ===
A statue of Hugo Chávez destroyed in Zulia on 5 May.

On 1 May 2017, hundreds of thousands of Venezuelans protested, attempting to march to various government buildings to have their demands met. Police responded to the peaceful marches violently, firing tear gas, with one National Assembly member, Jose Olivares, being struck in the head with a tear gas canister, which led to heavy bleeding. President Maduro announced later that day plans to replace the National Assembly with a communal national assembly and called for the drafting of a new constitution under a handpicked constituent assembly, the third in modern times.

The move by President Maduro would also allow him to stay in power during the interregnum, essentially nullifying the 2018 presidential elections, as the constitutional process would take at least two years. According to Reuters, "Maduro's call ... to rewrite the constitution has energized the protest movement".

Hundreds of thousands of people marched on 3 May, denouncing President Maduro's proposed rewrite of the constitution. The clashes between protesters and authorities left more than 300 injured and one dead; in one incident, National Guard VN-4 armoured personnel carriers rammed protesters who were rushing a group of guardsmen. A video went viral of President Maduro dancing on state television while National Guardsmen were seen using tear gas on protesters nearby. Reuters again noted that "images of a military vehicle running over a demonstrator ... caused further outrage", with protests continuing.

Opposition officials, on 5 May, draped a large banner down the side of the National Assembly's administrative building high above central Caracas reading "Dictator Maduro". Citizens of La Villa del Rosario burned and tore down a statue of late President Hugo Chávez, an act compared to the destruction of Saddam Hussein's statue in Iraq as well as other instances of statue toppling during times of popular unrest.

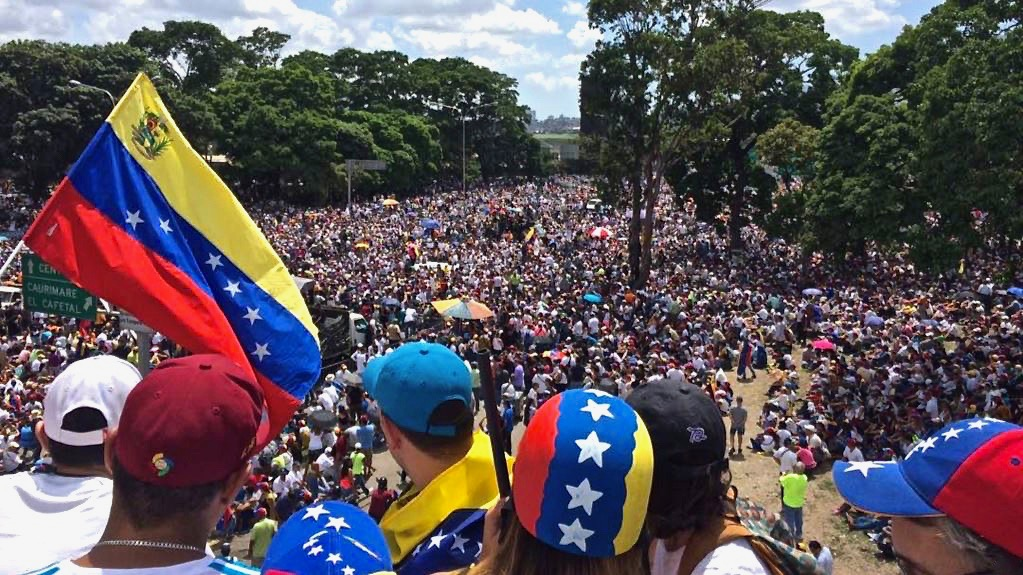
Millions of Venezuelans marching on 20 May during the We Are Millions march.

President Maduro announced a plan of "a military constituency to deepen the Bolivarian military revolution within the very heart of the Bolivarian National Armed Forces" on 8 May, calling for the military to help draft a new constitution with the goal to "strengthen the union" between the military and civilians. On 13 May 2017, President Maduro declared a "State of Emergency and Economic Emergency throughout the national territory" in the Official Gazette N° 6,298, creating the possibility of granting Maduro more decree powers and the power to temporarily suspend some constitutional rights.

On the 50th day of consecutive protests, millions of Venezuelans protested in Caracas on 20 May during the "We Are Millions" march, demanding an end to violent repression and immediate elections. The day resulted in over 120 injured in Caracas alone, while one man was killed in Valera, Trujillo by colectivo members despite nearby police presence.

The same month, the investment bank Goldman Sachs purchased $2.8 billion of PDVSA 2022 bonds from the Central Bank of Venezuela. In its original statement, Goldman stated that "We recognize that the situation is complex and evolving and that Venezuela is in crisis. We agree that life there has to get better, and we made the investment in part because we believe it will.". Venezuelan politicians and protesters in New York opposed to Maduro accused the bank of being of complicit of human rights abuses under the government and declared that the operation would fuel hunger in Venezuela by depriving the government of foreign exchange to import food, leading the securities to be dubbed "hunger bonds." The National Assembly voted to ask the U.S. Congress to investigate the deal, which they called "immoral, opaque, and hypocritical given the socialist government’s anti-Wall Street rhetoric". In a public letter to the bank's chief executive, Lloyd Blankfein, the National Assembly president Julio Borges said that "Goldman Sachs’s financial lifeline to the regime will serve to strengthen the brutal repression unleashed against the hundreds of thousands of Venezuelans peacefully protesting for political change in the country."

=== Barinas riots ===
It is pretty symbolic that the citizens are venting their frustrations on the author of the Bolivarian revolution

— Eric Farnsworth, vice president of Council of the Americas

Residents of Barinas – the hometown of President Maduro's predecessor, late President Hugo Chávez – began the day by demonstrating against Maduro's proposed constitutional changes. Following the death of Yorman Alí Bervecia and Jhon Alberto Quintero on 22 May, who were allegedly killed by the National Guard during the protests, citizens of Barinas began to riot. Individuals began to attack state institutions and buildings of the ruling PSUV party, including the local CNE office, the Barinas state PSUV headquarters and the La Concordia police station, where uniforms and firearms were stolen. Residents later turned their attention to the birthplace home of the late President Hugo Chávez, burning his childhood residence. Five statues of Chávez were also destroyed in the area's rioting. Among the chaos in "the cradle of Chavez's revolution", former chavistas were seen gathered and burning government related paraphernalia, denouncing President Maduro as "a tyrant" while chanting that his days were numbered as the leader of Venezuela. As the day concluded, over 50 stores were looted in Barinas, while additional deaths were recorded, with the death toll rising up to six killed as well as reports of hundreds being injured. Opposition leaders condemned the violence as the Barinas riots overshadowed their official demonstrations surrounding the healthcare of Venezuela that day.

=== Helicopter incident ===
We would never give up, and what couldn't be done with votes, we would do with weapons, we would liberate the fatherland with weapons.

— Nicolas Maduro,

On 27 June 2017, President Maduro stated that if his government fails, he and his supporters would use force to reestablish the government. That afternoon, a video was released showing men with assault rifles flanking Oscar Pérez, a film actor and investigator of CICPC, Venezuela's investigative agency, stating that "We are nationalists, patriots and institutionalists. This fight is not with the rest of the state forces, it is against the tyranny of this government". Hours after the video was released, Pérez is seen piloting a CICPC helicopter over the Supreme Court with a banner on the side reading "350 Liberty", a reference to Article 350 of the constitution which states that "The people of Venezuela ... shall disown any regime, legislation or authority that violates democratic values, principles and guarantees or encroaches upon human rights". While the helicopter was near the Supreme Court, gunfire was heard in the area. President Maduro stated that a military rebellion had occurred while opposition officials said that the actions were staged so Maduro could justify a crackdown on those who oppose his government and the constituent assembly. National Guardsmen then stormed the National Assembly, assaulting the largely opposition legislative body.

=== 2017 Venezuelan referendum ===
On 5 July 2017, the National Assembly announced plans of a referendum for Venezuelans to decide whether they agree with the Constituent Assembly election, demanded the military to recognize the National Assembly or demanded immediate general elections. That day, Vice President Tareck El Aissami led government supporters to the Palacio Federal Legislativo, where the National Assembly was later attacked by colectivos.

Days later, the 2017 Venezuelan referendum was held on 16 July, with the opposition stating that about 7.5 million Venezuelans participated in the process, with over 99% voting against the Constituent Assembly, voting for the recognition of the National Assembly and voting for immediate general elections.

=== Trancazos and strikes ===
Following the rejection of the referendum's results by the government, the opposition announced plans for a "zero hour", planning trancazos, or sit-ins where citizens often congregated in mass on streets to impede city life, and setting dates for general strikes. From 18 to 19 July, trancazos closed the streets of many cities in Venezuela. On 20 July, millions of Venezuelans participated in a 24-hour general strike.

=== 2017 Venezuelan Constituent Assembly election ===
A bomb being detonated near a Bolivarian National Police motorbike convoy responding to protests.

Despite opposition efforts, the 2017 Venezuelan Constituent Assembly election was held on 30 July 2017. The majority of those elected into the 2017 Constituent Assembly of Venezuela were loyal to the government due to the opposition boycott of the election. More than 40 countries condemned the elections, and raised concerns of Venezuela turning into a dictatorship.

Tibisay Lucena, president of the National Electoral Council, announced that 8,089,230 persons voted, with a 41.53% turnout though the voting machine company Smartmatic stated that the number of votes were manipulated by at least one million votes while Reuters also reported that according to internal CNE documents leaked to the agency, only 3,720,465 votes were cast thirty minutes before polls were expected to close, though polls were open for an additional hour.

=== Disillusionment of protest movement ===
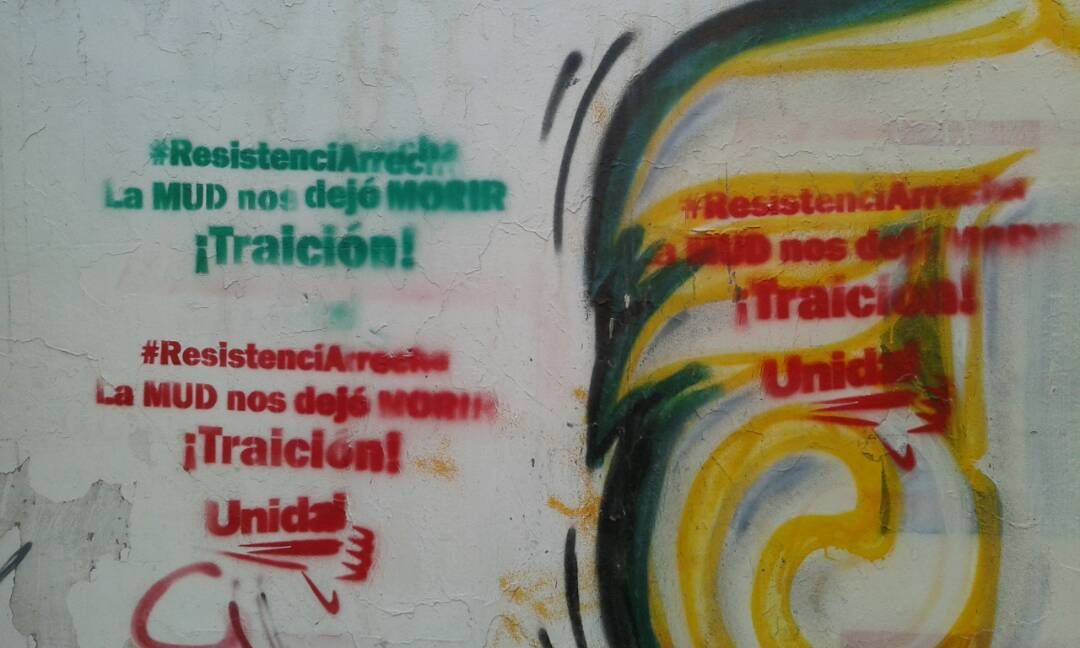
Graffitis expressing anger at the Unity Roundtable on October 5.

On 6 August 2017, about 20 individuals led by fugitive Captain Juan Caguaripano's "41st Brigade" attacked Paramacay Military Base near Valencia, Venezuela and stole weapons from the facility, with many residents of Valencia supporting the rebellion and shouting "freedom" in the streets. Most members of the attack as well as their leaders were captured days later.

By 8 August, a national trancazo called by the opposition was quickly dispersed and experienced low turnout. A march organized for 12 August had only about 1,000 participants, with many Venezuelans stating that they had lost interest in the protest movement due to the fear of repression and because of their anger towards the conflicted opposition, and expressing their disapproval with the opposition's decision to participate in the regional elections.

Following the 2017 Venezuelan regional elections where the opposition only won five of twenty-three governorships, disillusionment with the opposition movement grew, especially after four of five opposition governors elected of Democratic Action decided to be sworn in under the government-led National Constituent Assembly despite promises to never recognize the body.

=== Christmas protests ===
Shortly before and after Christmas, Venezuelans throughout the country, with these individual groups numbering no more than fifty, began to gather in groups and protest against the shortages of food and gasoline. Many gas stations throughout the country resorting to having military personnel distribute rationed amounts of gasoline.

== Protest violence ==
=== Deaths ===
States and Districts	Number of deaths
Amazonas	0
Anzoátegui	4
Apure	0
Aragua	3
Barinas	10
Bolívar	3
Capital District (Caracas)	25
Carabobo	21
Cojedes	0
Delta Amacuro	0
Falcón	0
Guárico	0
Lara	20
Mérida	17
Miranda	23
Monagas	0
Nueva Esparta	0
Portuguesa	0
Sucre	2
Táchira	21
Trujillo	1
Vargas	1
Yaracuy	0
Zulia	14
Total	163

==== April ====
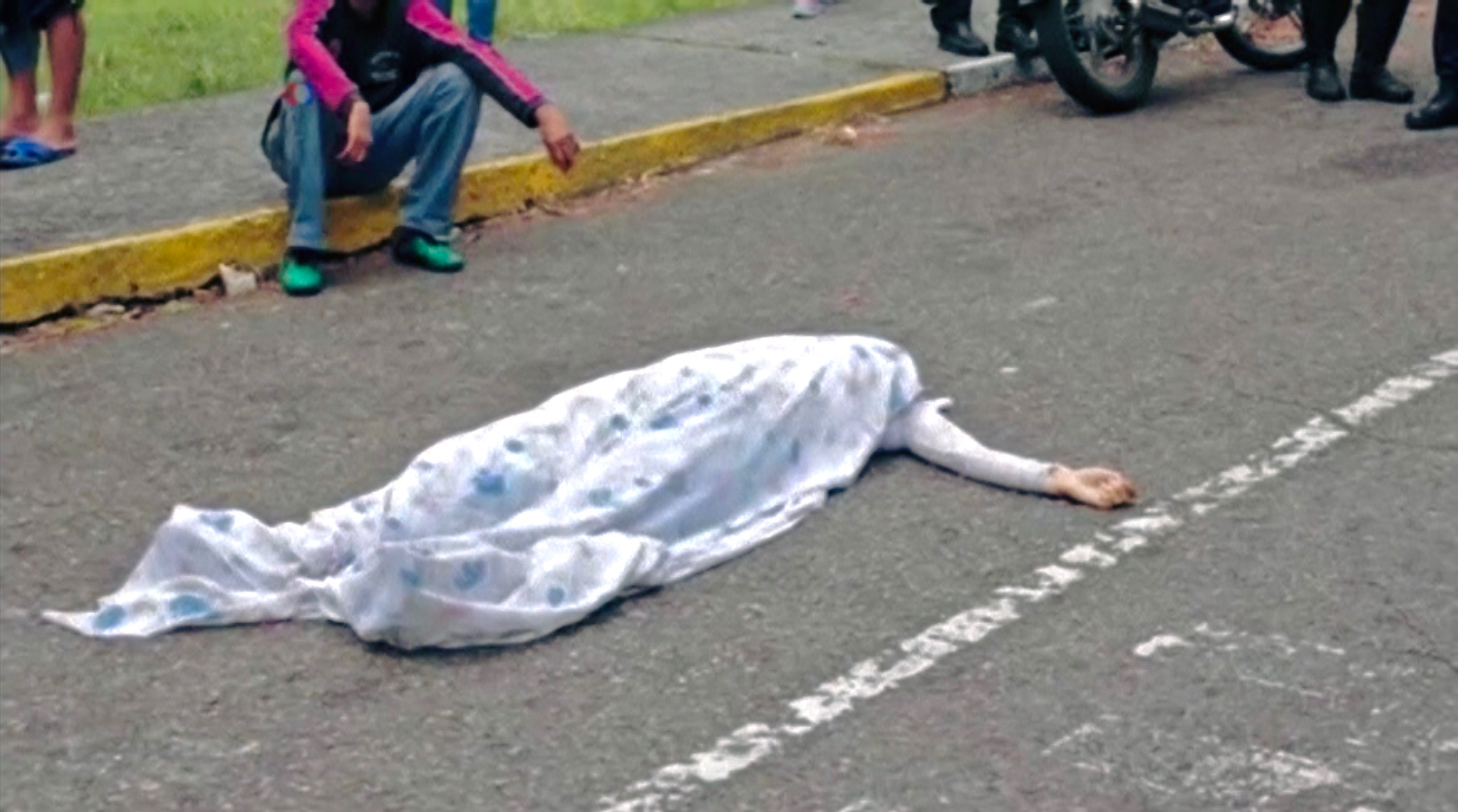
Body of Paola Ramírez during the Mother of All Marches

In the first month of protests, April 2017, 33 Venezuelans died as a result of incidents surrounding the protests. A large proportion of the deaths occurred on 20 April 2017, with 16 deaths being attributed to looting occurring in Caracas that evening consisting of thirteen electrocution deaths and three firearm deaths. Venezuelan authorities were the cause of 7 other deaths that month; five firearm deaths, one tear gas canister wound and one asphyxiation from tear gas, while pro-government paramilitary groups known as colectivos, which cooperate with government security forces to repress protesters, were responsible for another 6 deaths, all the result of firearms. Deaths perpetrated by unknown individuals accounted for 4 Venezuelans killed in April; three gunshot wounds and one head injury.

==== May ====
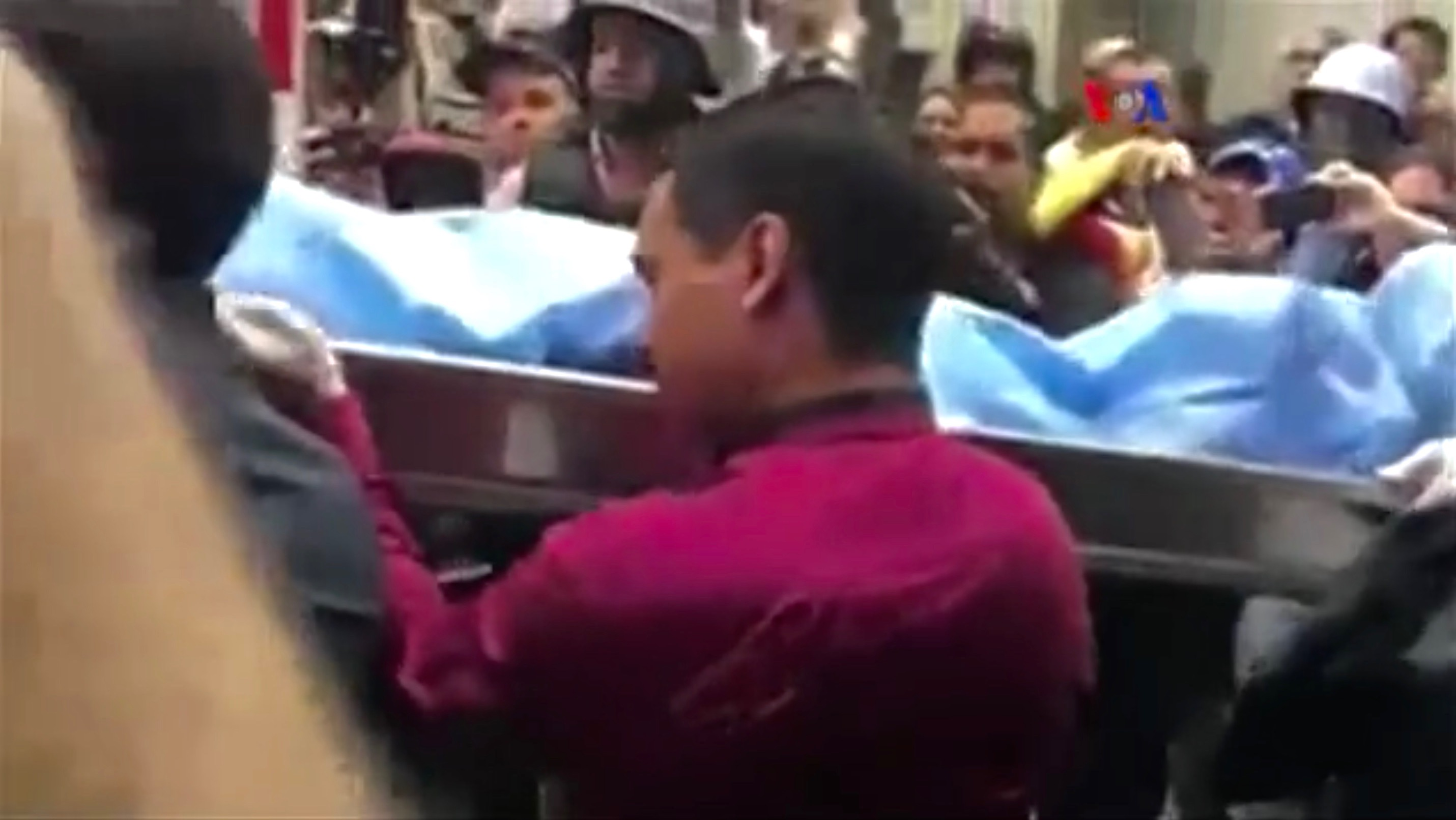
The body of Miguel Castillo Bracho

In the month of May, a total of 47 Venezuelans died following violence occurring near protests. Unknown perpetrators were the cause of death for 24 Venezuelans; twenty gunshot wounds, one head injury, two electrocutions and one unknown cause of death. Security forces were responsible for 16 deaths; all sixteen deaths attributed to firearms, while colectivos killed 2 individuals; all two resulting from firearms. Accidental and incidental deaths claimed 4 lives; two from an automobile accident with a barricade, two from being struck by a vehicle. Citizens of Barinas shot dead 1 member of the National Guard during the riots in the area in late-May.

==== June ====
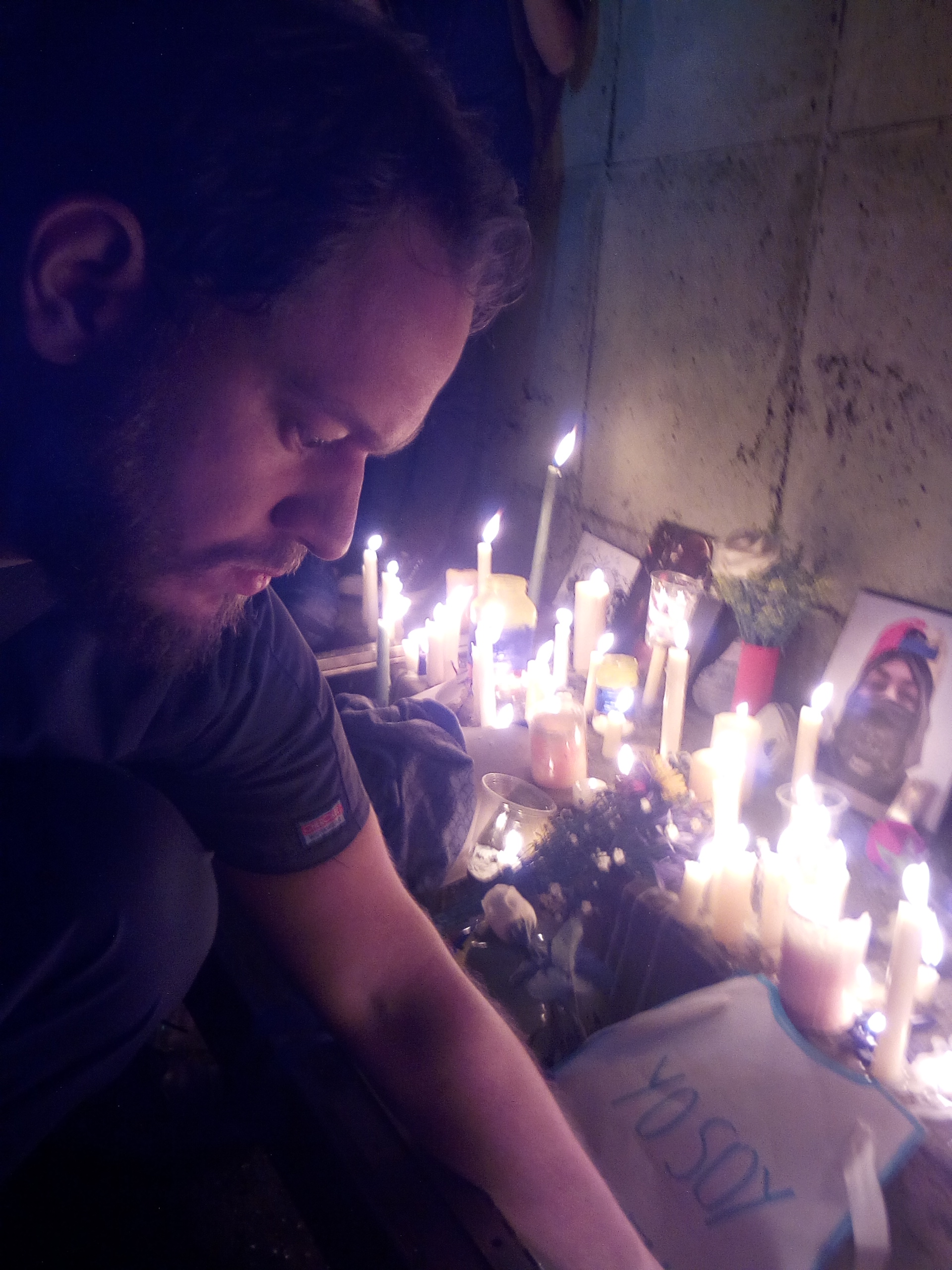
Man at an altar dedicated to Neomar Lander on 8 June.

In June, a total of 25 Venezuelans were killed during the protests. Fifteen deaths were attributed to unknown individuals, three deaths were caused by colectivos with all being gunshot wounds, three were caused by civilians, two were attributed to accidents, two were caused Venezuelan authorities with both being gunshot wounds. The causes of death were seventeen gunshot wound incidents, five incidents where individuals were struck by a vehicle, one death by tear gas asphyxiation, one death by blunt trauma and one lynching. A man who was struck in the head by a tear gas canister in June 2017 later died on 13 February 2018.

==== July ====
A total of 58 Venezuelans were killed in the month of July as protests culminated into the 2017 Venezuelan Constituent Assembly election. During the election day alone on 30 July, 10 individuals died as a result of violent clashes, representing a large number of those killed in the month. Excluding those killed during the 6 August Paramacay Military Base attack, July was the final month in which protesters were killed, as the protests began to dissipate in mid-August.

==== December ====
The final death during the 2017 protests occurred on Christmas Eve when an 18 year old pregnant woman was caught in a protest over limited amounts of pork. She was shot and killed by a National Guardsman at the scene who was later arrested.

=== Government ===
Amnesty International maintains that the government has a "premeditated policy" to commit violent and lethal acts against protesters, stating that there is "a planned strategy by the government of President Maduro to use violence and illegitimate force against the Venezuelan population to neutralize any criticism".

==== Torture and abuses ====
External videos
- Human Rights Watch multimedia report on abuses on YouTube

Human rights groups have stated that Venezuelan authorities have used force to gain confessions. Foro Penal stated that "most of the detainees are beaten once they are arrested, while they are being transferred to a temporary detention site where they are to be brought before a judge", giving one instance with "a group of 40 people arrested for alleged looting, 37 reported that they were beaten before their hair was forcefully shaved off their heads". In other examples of abuses, "15 reported that they were forced to eat pasta with grass and excrement. The regime’s officials forced dust from tear gas canisters up their noses to pry open their mouths. They then shoved the pasta with excrement in their mouths and made them swallow it". Venezuela's intelligence agency, SEBIN, was ordered by President Maduro on 16 April to take legal actions against individuals who state that they have been tortured by authorities.

I order SEBIN to sue those spokesmen of the opposition who are accusing of barbarities and improper acts that are never discussed in this republic.

— President Nicolás Maduro

According to the Justice and Peace Commission of the Venezuelan Episcopal Conference, many other cases of abuses have been recorded. In one instance, a woman was arrested in Altos Mirandinos by the National Guard where she was beaten and then urinated on by three National Guardsmen who threatened to rape her.

Human Rights Watch has reviewed extensive evidence implicating the Venezuelan security forces ... in a wide range of serious abuses since protesters took to the streets ... Security forces have used excessive force and condoned attacks by armed pro-government groups against massive anti-government protests, leading to dozens of deaths and hundreds of injuries. Security forces have also engaged in arbitrary arrests and physical abuse against detainees that in some cases would amount to torture.

— Human Rights Watch

In a 15 June statement, Human Rights Watch stated that high levels officials of the government, such as Major General Antonio José Benavides Torres, the head of the Bolivarian National Guard; Chief General Vladimir Padrino López, the defense minister and the strategic operational commander of the Armed Forces; Major General Néstor Reverol, the interior minister, General Carlos Alfredo Pérez Ampueda, director of the Bolivarian National Police; Major General Gustavo González López, the national intelligence director, and Captain Siria Venero de Guerrero, the military attorney general, are responsible for the human rights violations and abuses performed by Venezuelan security forces during the protests. Venezuelan officials have praised authorities for their actions and denied any wrongdoing.

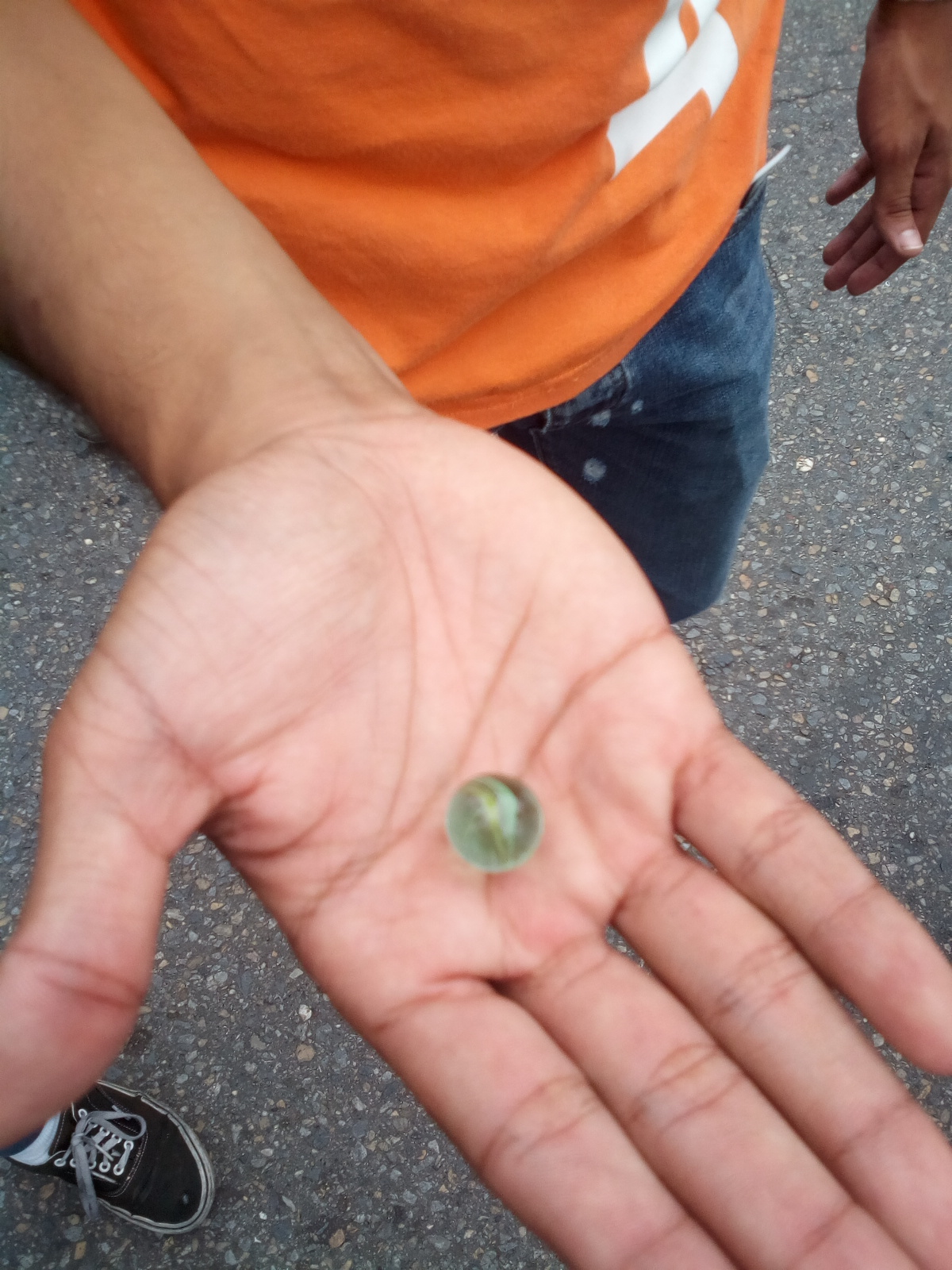
Marble shot by the National Guard on 7 June.

The United Nations has decried "widespread and systematic use of excessive force" against demonstrators, saying security forces and pro-government groups were responsible for the deaths of at least 73 protesters. UN rights office described "a picture of widespread and systematic use of excessive force and arbitrary detentions against demonstrators in Venezuela". "Witness accounts suggest that security forces, mainly the national guard, the national police and local police forces, have systematically used disproportionate force to instil fear, crush dissent and to prevent demonstrators from assembling, rallying and reaching public institutions to present petitions," the rights office said.

Sexual violence towards arrested protesters has also been reported. Detainee Diannet Blanco reported being held in a cell with 26 other women with poor ventilation and sanitation, as well as a lack of water.

==== Raids in residential areas ====
A report by Human Rights Watch and Foro Penal documented at least six cases in which Venezuelan security forces raided residential areas and apartment buildings in Caracas and in four different states, usually near barricades built by residents. According to testimonies, officials bursted into houses without warrants, stealing personal belongings and food from residents, as well as beating and arresting them.

==== Use of tear gas ====
Groups such as the Venezuelan Observatory of Health have denounced the use of tear gas fired directly or nearby health centers and hospitals, as well as houses and residential buildings. A report of the Office of the United Nations High Commissioner for Human Rights specified that non lethal weapons, were used systematically to cause unnecessary injuries, explaining that security forces fired tear gas canisters directly against protesters at short distances.

==== Use of firearms ====
External videos
- National Guardsman firing live ammunition at protesters on 19 June, killing Fabián Urbina on YouTube

David Vallenilla being shot dead by Venezuelan authorities

The majority of individuals killed during protests died from gunshot wounds, with many resulting from the repression by Venezuelan authorities and assisting pro-government colectivos. During protests on 5 June, members of CONAS, Venezuela's elite anti-kidnapping task-force, fired live ammunition at protesters in eastern Caracas as they gathered near the CCCT shopping mall.

==== Use of chemical agents ====
In 2017, Amnesty International once again criticized the government's usage of chemical agents, expressing concern of a "red gas" used to suppress protesters in Chacao on 8 April 2017, demanding "clarification of the components of the red tear gas used by state security forces against the opposition demonstrations". Experts stated that all tear gas used by authorities should originally be colorless, noting that the color may be added to provoke or "color" protesters so they can easily be identified and arrested.

On 10 April 2017, Venezuelan police fired tear gas at protesters from helicopters flying overhead, which is prohibited by Article 141 of the Civil Aeronautic Law; demonstrators fled to avoid being hit by the high-velocity canisters.

Mónica Kräuter, a chemist and teacher of the Simón Bolívar University who has studied over a thousand tear gas canisters since 2014, has stated that security forces have fired expired tear gas which, according to her, "breaks down into cyanide oxide, phosgenes and nitrogens that are extremely dangerous".

=== Protesters ===
==== Resistencia ====
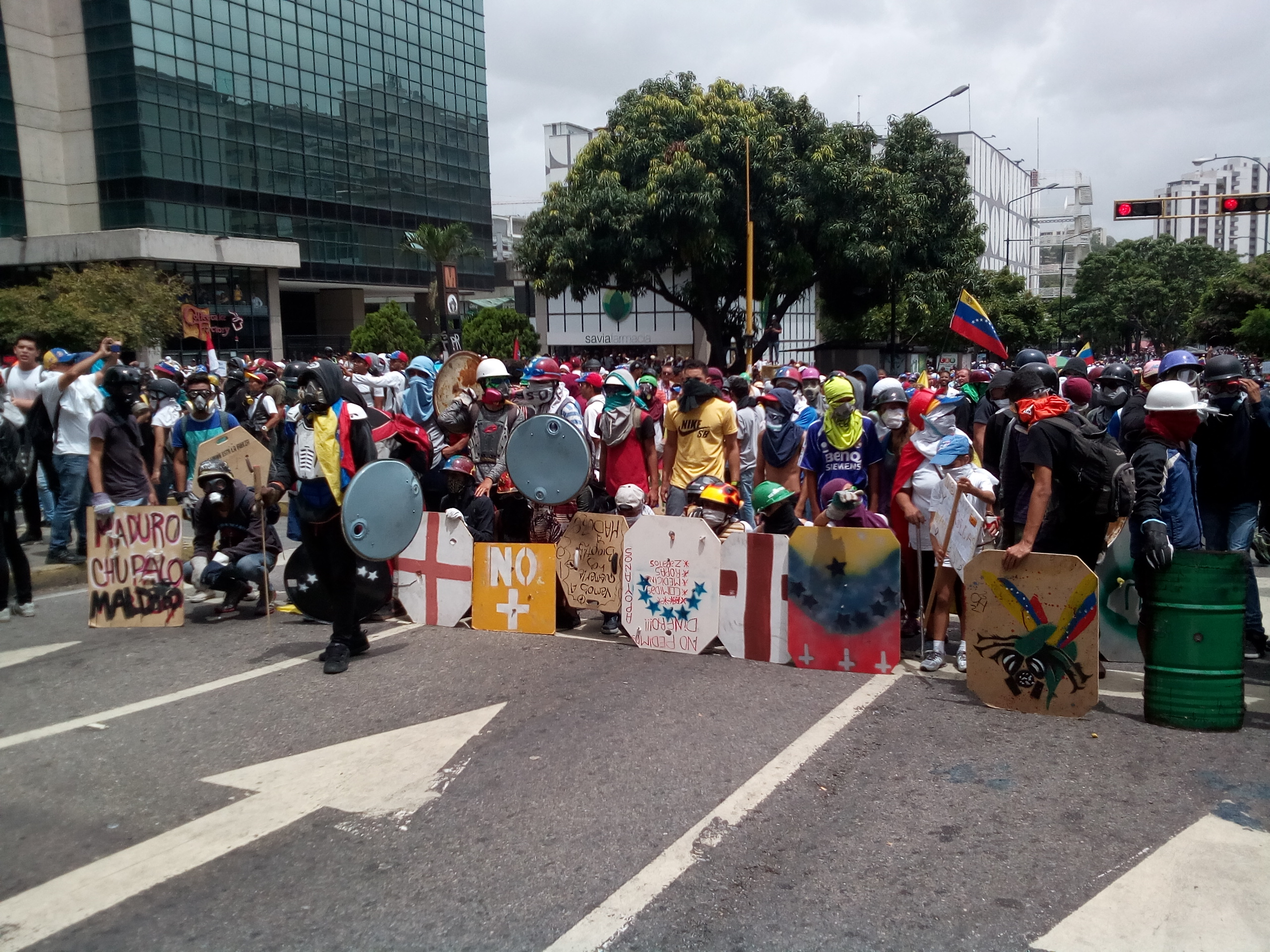
Escuderos bearing shields at a protest

Organized groups, known as the Resistencia (Resistance), perform confrontational acts against Venezuelan authorities, stating that they defend other protesters from approaching violent authorities. Some former Venezuelan authorities are members of the Resistencia, teaching them riot formations and other government methods. The groups deny attacks on government buildings.

Some Resistencia groups are organized in this fashion:

- Escuderos, or those who wield shields to protect from bullets and tear gas canisters
- Devolvederos, "returners" of tear gas, those who own gas masks
- Molotov cocktail armed members, to prevent the approachment of armored vehicles
- Radio observers, communicate government positions and escape plans

== Law enforcement ==
=== Plan Zamora ===
Sadly, this is the beginning of a war, gentlemen ... They will continue until reaching the point where an intervention is justified. Let’s not fool ourselves. Sadly, it fell to our generation to live with this conflict, and we have to assume it to the degree that is being demanded by our country.

— Unidentified Venezuelan general

Over 2,000 security checkpoints were ordered by President Maduro on 15 April, which would be established throughout Venezuela prior to the 19 April "mega march", with nearly 200,000 Venezuelan authorities said to be participating. Finally on 18 April, President Maduro "green-lighted" Plan Zamora, a plan compared to the heavily criticized Plan Ávila, and was described by officials as "a joint strategic plan to respond to possible adverse events or foreign intervention that endangers the country's security". Antonio Benavides, commander of the Bolivarian National Guard, stated that the plan involved "the incorporation of the people to exercise the transition from normal social activity to the state of internal or external commotion", granting Bolivarian civilians the power to act as shock troops. The plan also granted the State the power to arrest protesters under martial law and have civilians face military tribunals, which was heavily criticized by human rights groups. Civilians accused of attacking military authorities would be charged with "rebellion" and could be summarily tried in military courts.

==== Use of snipers ====
External image
- Snipers presence reported in El Hatillo municipality in Caracas.

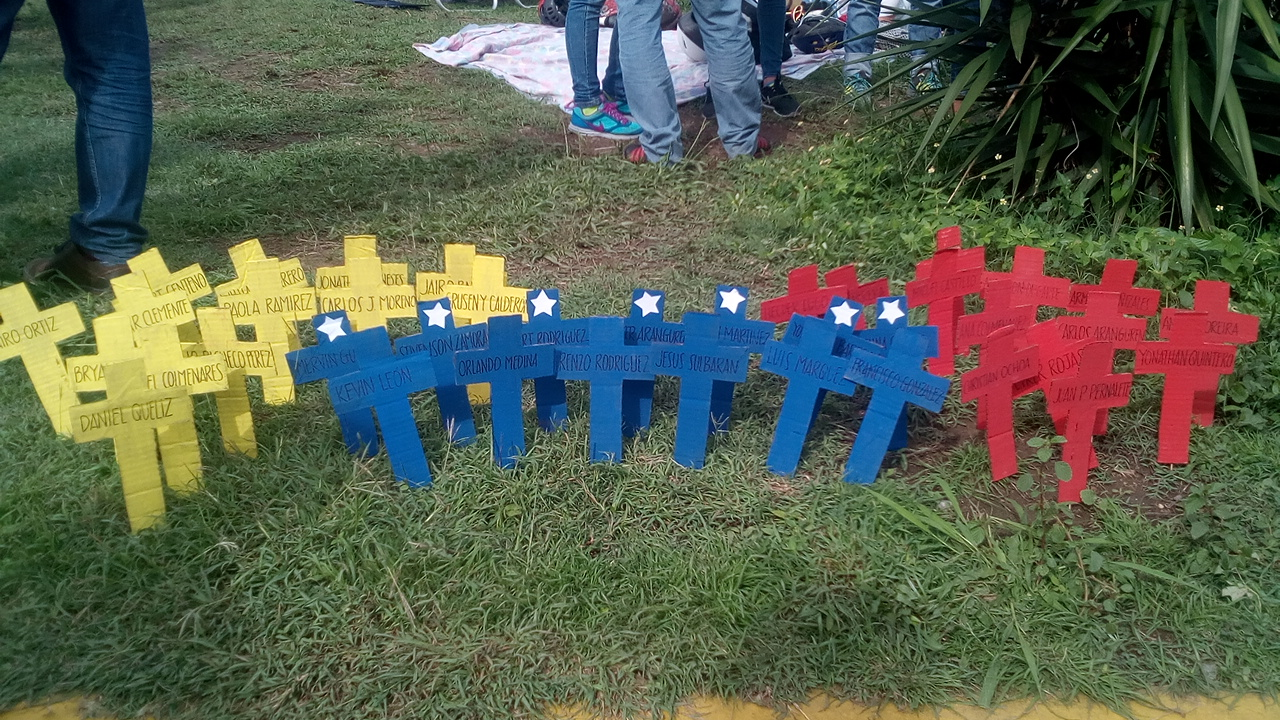
Venezuelan tricolor crosses commemorating those killed during protests.

In late-April, days after the Mother of All Marches, generals of the National Bolivarian Armed Forces of Venezuela gathered in Barquisimeto at discussion chaired by Lara Division General José Rafael Torrealba Pérez; with Brigadier General Hernán Enrique Homez Machado (National Guard), Brigadier General Carlos Enrique Quijada Rojas (Air Force), Brigadier General Dilio Rafael Rodríguez Díaz (Army), Brigadier General Joel Vicente Canelón (Army) and Brigadier General Iván Darío Lara Lander (Army) attending.

At the meeting, Torrealba suggests the use of snipers against protesters, explaining that sniper candidates must be chosen out of loyalty, telling the generals "to make preparations with those individuals that can serve as snipers, beginning with psychological and aptitude tests". He further explained the risk of civil war, stating that President Maduro "has already signed a range of operations and as I said ... we could be at the beginning of a subversive urban war". Despite the objection by an attending general, Torrealba insisted that the snipers would scare protesters off the street, saying "it will only be us that pulls through because ... once people start to see dead bodies, and dead bodies begin to appear, then everyone will begin to stay at home ... You will remember my words, the armed forces are the ones that have to solve this problem".

On 22 May, it was reported that snipers supposedly belonging to the National Guard were firing from the Center for Education and Development of Petróleos de Venezuela rooftops in the El Hatillo Municipality.

=== Civilian groups ===
==== Bolivarian Militia and colectivos ====
On 1 February 2017, President Maduro announced that the Bolivarian Militia would be directed towards an anti-protest objective, saying that his supporters "will multiply throughout the territory, special forces of rapid action, special troops of the militias ... to make our homeland impregnable".

Two days before the Mother of All Marches, President Maduro on 17 April ordered the expansion of the Bolivarian Militia to involve 500,000 loyal Venezuelans, stating that each would be armed with a rifle and demanded the prevention of another event similar to the 2002 Venezuelan coup d'état attempt.

Diosdado Cabello, a high-level PSUV official loyal to the government, stated that 60,000 motorized colectivos and the Bolivarian Militia would be spread throughout Caracas on 19 April "until necessary" to deter the opposition's "megamarch", calling their actions "terrorism".

Observatorio Venezolano de Conflictividad Social stated that between 1 April 2017 and 31 July 2017, colectivos attacked at least 523 of 6,729 of protests – or about 8% of protests – with bullet wounds reported in the majority of the protests where colectivos were involved.

=== Ban on imports ===
The Venezuelan government on 27 May began to block the import of first aid kits, gas masks, gauze, eye drops, and bullet-proof vests, among other products, stating that the goods were to be used by terrorists.

== Media ==
=== Attacks on journalists ===
In the early days of the protests on 12 April, the Committee to Protect Journalists (CPJ) issued an advisory to journalists, stating:

Local and international journalists covering the protests have been attacked, beaten, arrested and sprayed with tear gas, and have had their equipment confiscated and stolen. ... Journalists covering the story told the CPJ that the authorities have been firing tear gas into the crowds at close range. ... Local and international media have found it increasingly difficult to operate in Venezuela due to government obstruction. Police and armed pro-government gangs have detained, harassed and attacked journalists. Assaults have taken place in broad daylight, and pro-government gangs have stolen media equipment.

The CPJ offered advice on how to avoid aggression, how to react to tear gas and how to contact the organization to report any attacks on journalists.

During the Mother of All Marches, an El Nacional reporter was robbed by a Bolivarian National Police officer. The following day, more than 50 government sympathizers attacked three El Nacional journalists on 20 April, near La India, beating them with sticks while also throwing rocks and bottles at them. Another journalist captured the attack on film.

On 6 May during a women's march, reporters were attacked by state authorities throughout the country. In San Carlos, Cojedes, Alexander Olvera was kicked by a National Guardsman while covering a protest. A reporter for El Pitazo, Yessica Sumoza, was robbed of her equipment in Caracas, while in Aragua, local police struck reporter Gaby Aguilar in the face with a stone. Alexander Medina of Radio Fe y Alegría, meanwhile, was surrounded by authorities in San Fernando, Apure who threatened to lynch the reporter.

During protests on 8 May, there were 19 reports of attacks on journalists, with 5 instances involving protesters attempting to rob reporters, while the other 15 reports involved Venezuelan authorities and colectivos.

On 10 May, 27-year-old Miguel Castillo Bracho, a journalist who had graduated the previous week, died after being shot in the chest with a tear gas canister by a National Guardsman while already being detained. On 18 May, four journalists were attacked by the National Guard and had their equipment stolen, including Eugenio García of Spain, Herminia Rodríguez of Globovision, Andry Rincón of Vivoplaynet and Kevin Villamizar of El Nacional.

During the 20 May protests, a graphic journalist of La Patilla was injured in Chacaíto after being shot in the leg with a tear gas canister.

=== Censorship ===
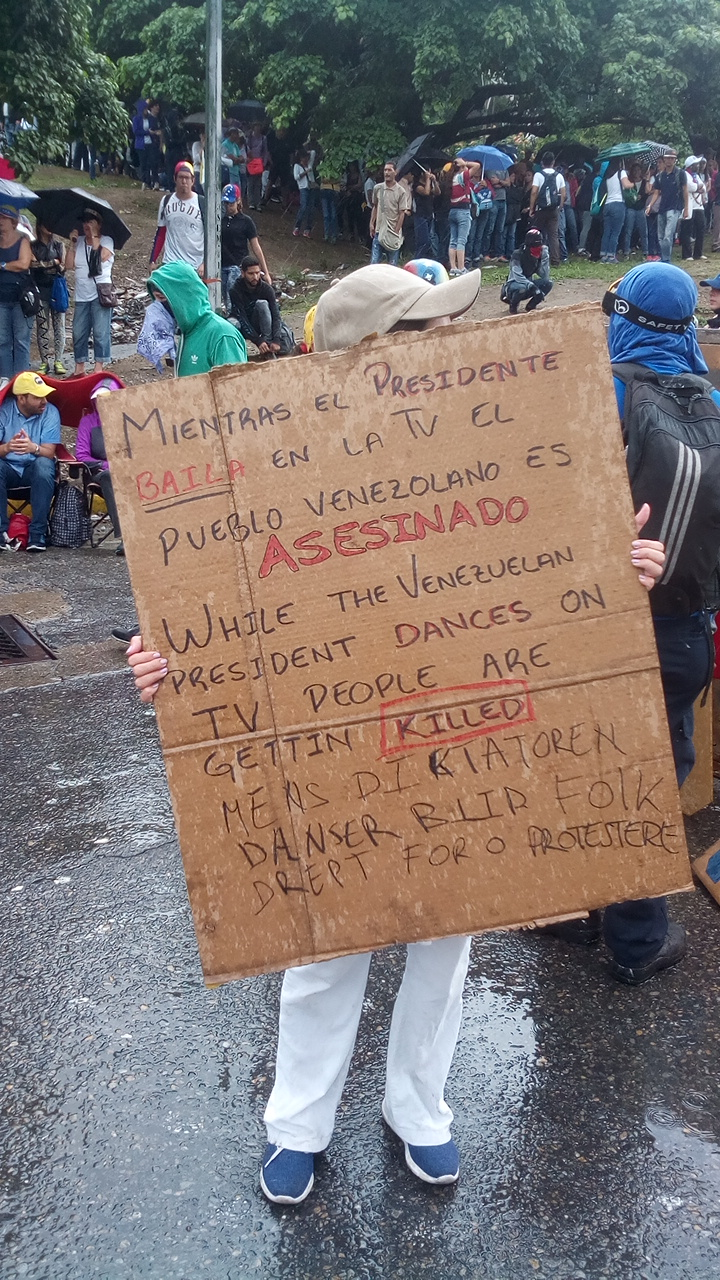
Sign criticizing Venezuelan media coverage.

President Maduro ordered cable providers to take CNN en Español off the air on 14 February 2017, days after CNN aired an investigation into the alleged fraudulent issuing of Venezuelan passports and visas. The news story revealed a confidential intelligence document that linked Venezuelan Vice President Tareck El Aissami to 173 Venezuelan passports and IDs issued to individuals from the Middle East, including people connected to the terrorist group Hezbollah.

During the Mother of All Marches on 19 April, TN's satellite signal was censored from DirecTV after showing live coverage of the protests. El Tiempo of Colombia was also censored in the country during the day's protests. That night, the National Commission of Telecommunications removed the Spanish channel Antena 3 from cable carriers, following rumors that they were going to cover the political crisis in Venezuela.

== Hacking ==
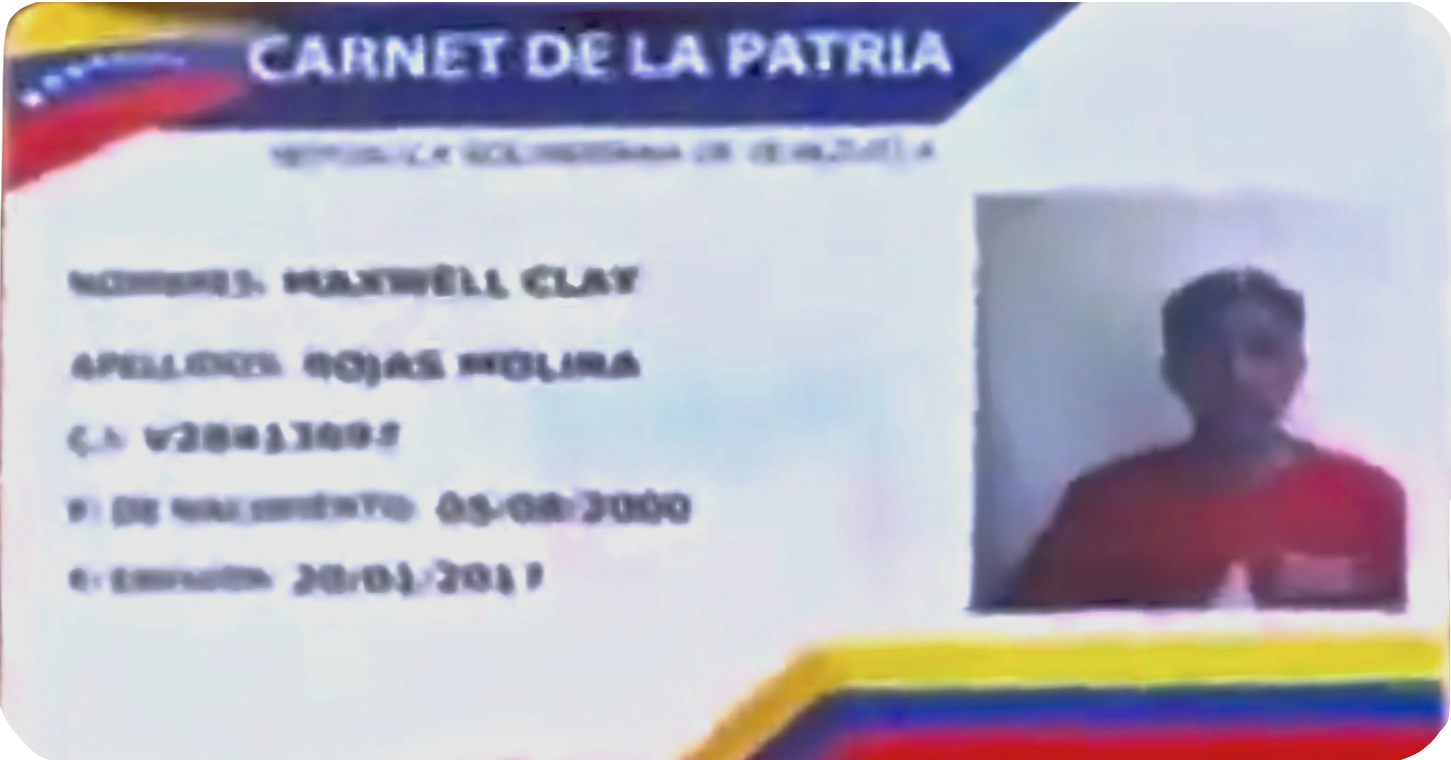
Venezuelans require their government-issued Carnet de la Patria ("Homeland" identity) cards to receive CLAP food.

On 6 May 2017, it was reported that two individuals on Twitter, @yosoyjustin and @ERHDP calling themselves TeamHDPP, breached several Venezuelan government agencies and Internet portals, hacking information from Carnet de la Patria holders. Hacker @yosoyjsutin stated that the hackings were "for all the Venezuelans fallen during the last days of protests in Venezuela. Their deaths will not be in vain". Details hacked included "identities, telephone numbers, email accounts, Twitter and addresses among other personal descriptions" of government officials and authorities, including those of National Bolivarian Police, CICPC, SEBIN, CONATEL and the Chancellery. The Carnet de la Patria accounts of President Nicolás Maduro, his wife (First Lady Cilia Flores), the Minister of Popular Power for Communication and Information Ernesto Villegas, Diosdado Cabello, Chancellor Delcy Rodríguez, Admiral Carmen Teresa Meléndez Rivas and other officials were also cancelled. The hackers added, "We have more than 450 PDF files and more than a thousand page conversations of them".

Following the 2017 Constituent Assembly election, The Binary Guardians, a hacker group, attacked multiple Venezuelan government and military websites placing anti-government messages and called for the military to intervene against the government.

On August 6 the MUD denounced that their website was hacked for a second time. The site was defaced, featuring US president Donald Trump and French politician Jean-Luc Mélenchon giving a speech about an alleged international policy of destabilization in Venezuela.

== International reactions ==
Venezuelans and activists harassed government officials and their families who enjoyed luxurious lifestyles compared to Venezuelan citizens. The top income of a Venezuelan official would be approximately $700 per year. Despite this, families of government officials live abroad and even attend foreign universities.

The daughter of Caracas mayor and Bolivarian official Jorge Rodríguez, Lucia Rodriguez, who is also the niece of foreign minister Delcy Rodríguez, resides in Australia attending SAE Institute. Human rights activists have criticized her lifestyle in Australia, with activists verbally attacking Rodriguez as she was at Bondi Beach sipping cocktails, requiring her personal body guard to intervene. The former banking minister under Chávez, Eugenio Vasquez Orellana, was also harassed while eating at a Venezuelan bakery in Doral, Florida. On 11 May, Venezuelans in Spain surrounded a cultural center in Spain preventing Venezuelan ambassador Mario Isea from leaving, with Isea calling the action a "kidnapping". President Maduro compared the verbal confrontations with Bolivarian sympathizers abroad to the Nazi persecution of the Jews, stating "We are the Jews of the 21st century". The Confederation of Israelite Associations of Venezuela denounced Maduro's comparison to the Holocaust, stating "That episode in the history of humanity, which cost 6 million Jews their lives, among them 1.5 million children, is unique and incomparable" and that his comparison "offends the memory of the Victims and all who are direct mourners of this dark episode of humanity".

== In popular culture ==
- The 2018 short film Simón, directed by Venezuelan filmmaker Diego Vicentini, is about a Venezuelan demonstrator that flees the country during the protests.
- The 2023 film Simón, also directed by Vicentini, follows the homonymous Venezuelan protester that is detained during the demonstrations and tortured along with his companions.

== See also ==
- Protests against Nicolás Maduro
- La Salida
- 2014 Venezuelan protests
- 2019 Venezuelan protests
- List of protests in the 21st century
