= National Militia =

National Militia (Spanish: Milicia Nacional) may refer to

- Venezuelan National Militia (Venezuela, 2009–)
- National Militia (Spain, 17th–18th century)
- National Militia (Ukraine, 2017–)
- Ukrainian National Militia (Ukraine, 1941)
