= Mother of All Marches =

2017 Venezuelan protest against the Chavista presidency

- Part of the 2017 Venezuelan protests
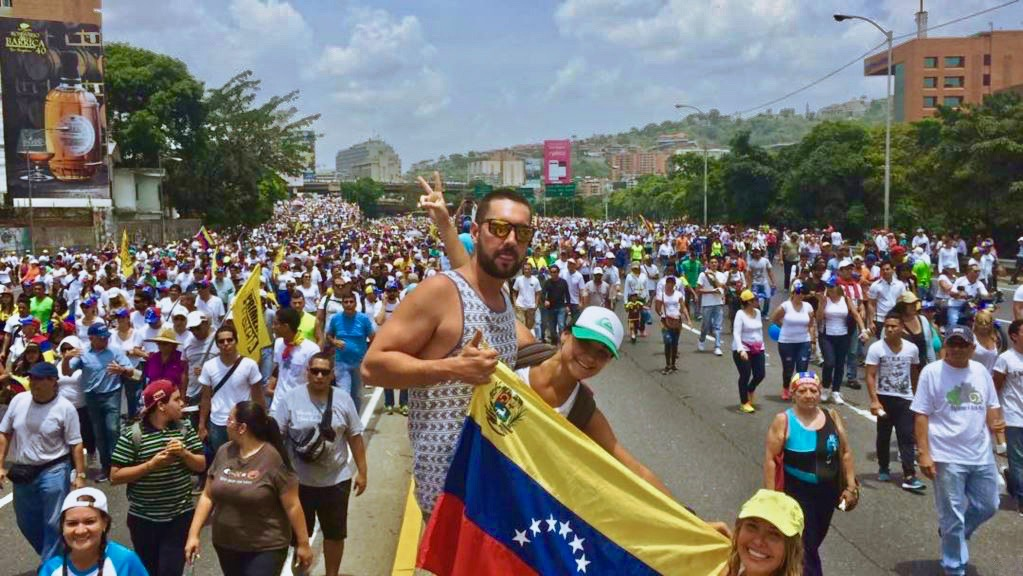
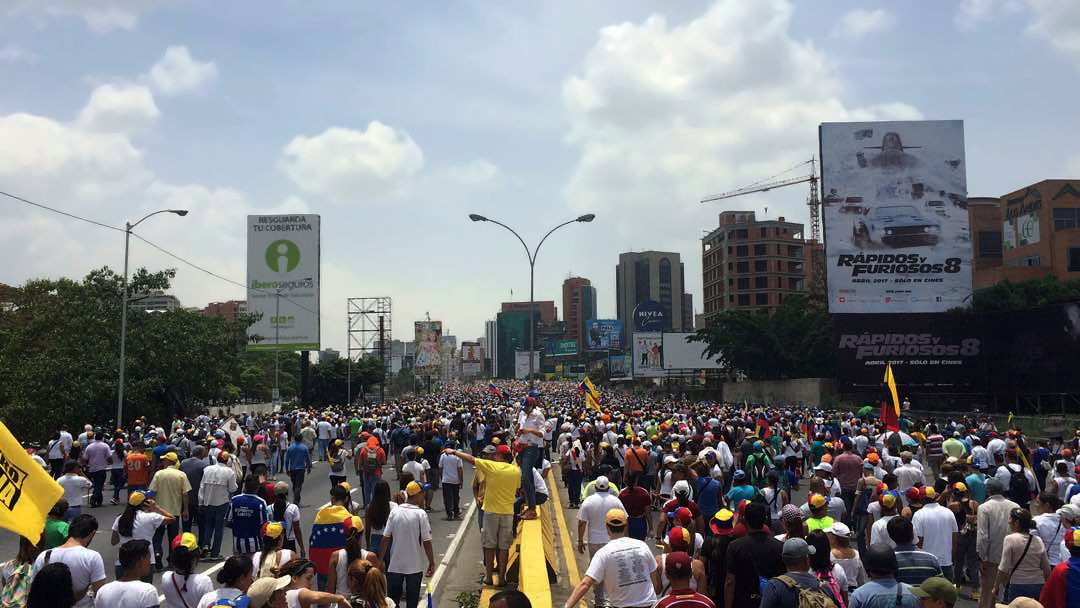
- Protesters heading for the ombudsman's office demanding immediate elections and the release of political prisoners. Top image is facing east on Francisco Fajardo Highway, bottom image is facing west.
- Date: 19 April 2017
- Location: Venezuela
- Caused by: 2017 Venezuelan constitutional crisis
- Goals: Release of official election schedule

Parties
Venezuelan opposition Democratic Unity Roundtable (VP, PF, UNT, AD, COPEI and others): Movimiento Estudiantil (Student opposition organization); Anti-government protesters: Anti-government students	Government of Venezuela: Bolivarian National Armed Forces (FANB); Venezuelan National Guard; Bolivarian National Police; Great Patriotic Pole (PSUV, PCV, MEP, MRT and others) Pro-government paramilitaries (Colectivos)

Lead figures
Popular Will: Leopoldo López; David Smolansky; Vente Venezuela: María Corina Machado; Justice First: Henrique Capriles; Others: Lilian Tintori	Government of Venezuela: President Nicolás Maduro; Vice President Tareck El Aissami; Diosdado Cabello

Number
Up to 6 million: 2.5 million (Caracas)	Thousands

Casualties
- Deaths: 3
- Injuries: 62
- Arrested: 521
- Detained: 312

The Mother of All Marches (Spanish: La madre de todas las marchas), also known as the Mother of All Protests, was a day of protests held on April 19, 2017, in Venezuela against the Chavista government of president Nicolás Maduro. The protests began after the Supreme Tribunal of Justice dissolved the National Assembly and took over its legislative powers March 29, 2017 in what was called a self-coup. The dissolution of the National Assembly was reversed shortly thereafter on April 1, 2017.

Opposition protesters originally marched peacefully until their path was blocked by Venezuelan authorities, with some looting and clashes resulting following the confrontation. By the end of that day, three Venezuelans were killed, two protesters and one National Guardsman, and over 500 were arrested.

== Background ==
Following the death of President Hugo Chávez, Venezuela faced a severe socioeconomic crisis during the presidency of his successor, Nicolás Maduro, as a result of Chávez's policies and Maduro's continuation of them. Protests in Venezuela originally began in February 2014 when hundreds of thousands of Venezuelans protested due to high levels of criminal violence, inflation, and chronic scarcity of basic goods because of policies created by the Venezuelan government Protests then occurred over the years, with demonstrations occurring in various intensities depending on the crises Venezuelans were facing at the time and the perceived threat of being repressed by authorities.

Students protesting against rulings outside of the TSJ on 31 March 2017.

Concentration on protests subsided in the first months of 2017 until the 2017 Venezuelan constitutional crisis occurred when the pro-government Supreme Tribunal of Justice of Venezuela attempted to assume the opposition-led National Assembly by removing their immunity. Though the move was reversed days later, demonstrations grew "into the most combative since a wave of unrest in 2014". Protests following the crisis persisted for four weeks before the "Mother of All Marches", with 5 protesters dying in the preceding weeks.

By April 14, 2017, the opposition formally announced plans for the "Grand March and Great Taking in All States" march to take place on 19 April to "overflow" Caracas. The next day, President Maduro announced that over 2,000 security checkpoints would be established throughout Venezuela prior to the April 19 "mega march", which was said to have nearly 200,000 Venezuelan authorities participating. Venezuela's intelligence agency, SEBIN. President Maduro also ordered legal actions against individuals who stated that they had been tortured by authorities.

I order SEBIN to sue those spokesmen of the opposition who are accusing of barbarities and improper acts that are never discussed in this republic.

— President Nicolás Maduro

Two days before the march on 17 April, President Maduro ordered the expansion of the Venezuelan National Militia to involve 500,000 loyal Venezuelans, stating that each would be armed with a rifle and demanded the prevention of another event similar to the 2002 Venezuelan coup d'état attempt. Diosdado Cabello, a high-level PSUV official loyal to the Bolivarian government, stated that 60,000 motorized colectivos and the National Militia would be spread throughout Caracas on 19 April "until necessary" to deter the opposition's "megamarch", calling their actions "terrorism".

== Protests ==
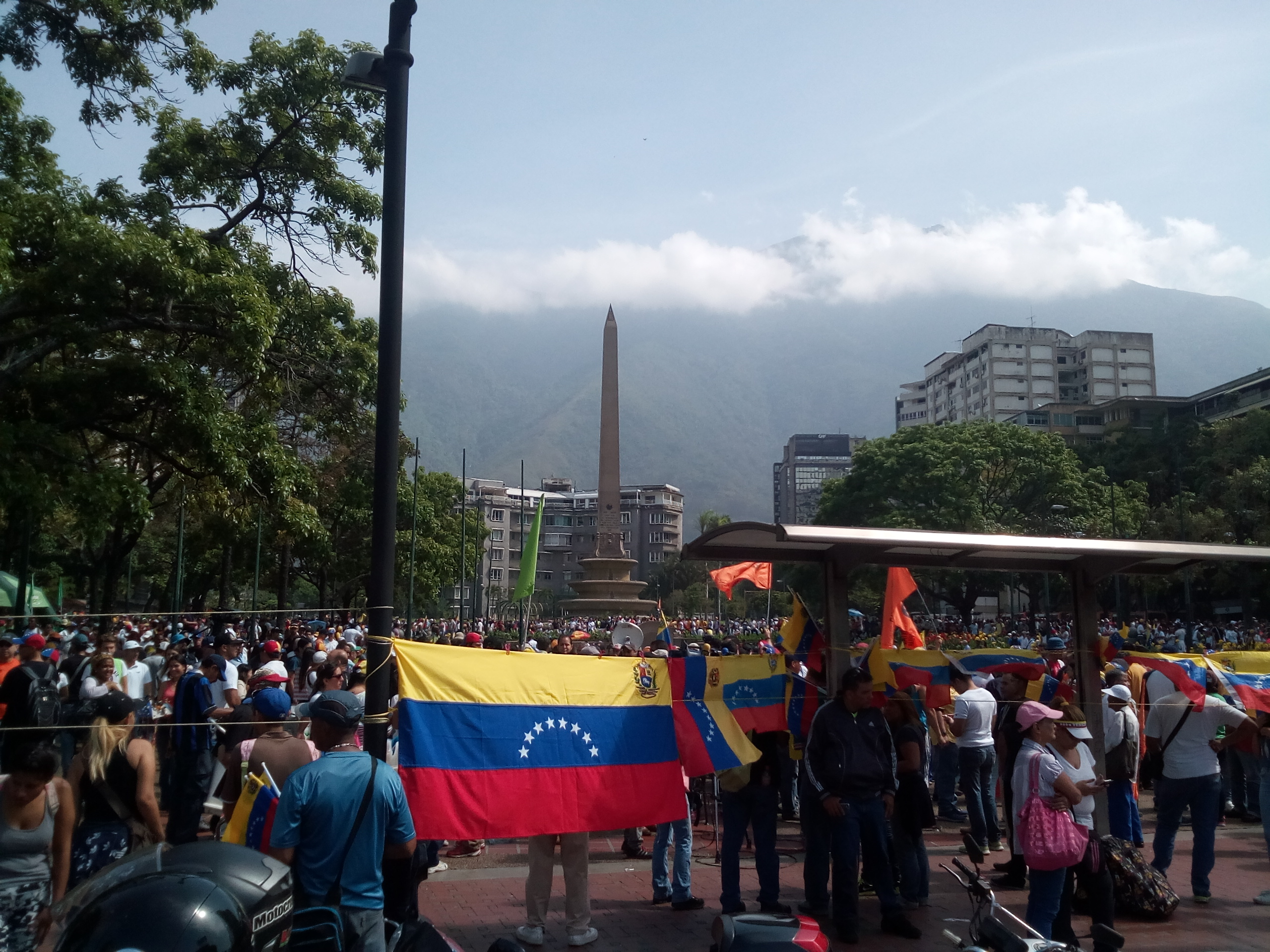
Altamira Square, one of the meeting points of the 19 April 2017 march.

The day began with demonstrators gathering around the country at about 10:30am, with Caracas having 26 different routes for the main march to head to the office of the Ombudsman Tarek William Saab to demonstrate. As the march progressed through Caracas, the National Guard began to block routes and fire tear gas at marchers at 11:50am, with the demonstrators refusing to leave despite the use of force.

At about 12:30pm, demonstrations by both opposition and pro-government Venezuelans fill Caracas' avenues. Shortly after 12:45pm, protesters on the Francisco Fajardo Freeway near Bello Monte begin to flee the area after enduring over an hour of tear gas from authorities, with many leaping into the Guaire River, which is used for sewage drainage, to avoid the gas. Near 2:10pm, a 17-year-old boy was shot in the head and killed at a protest. At about 4:35pm, pro-government paramilitaries called colectivos shot and killed Paola Ramírez, a 23-year-old woman who was protesting.

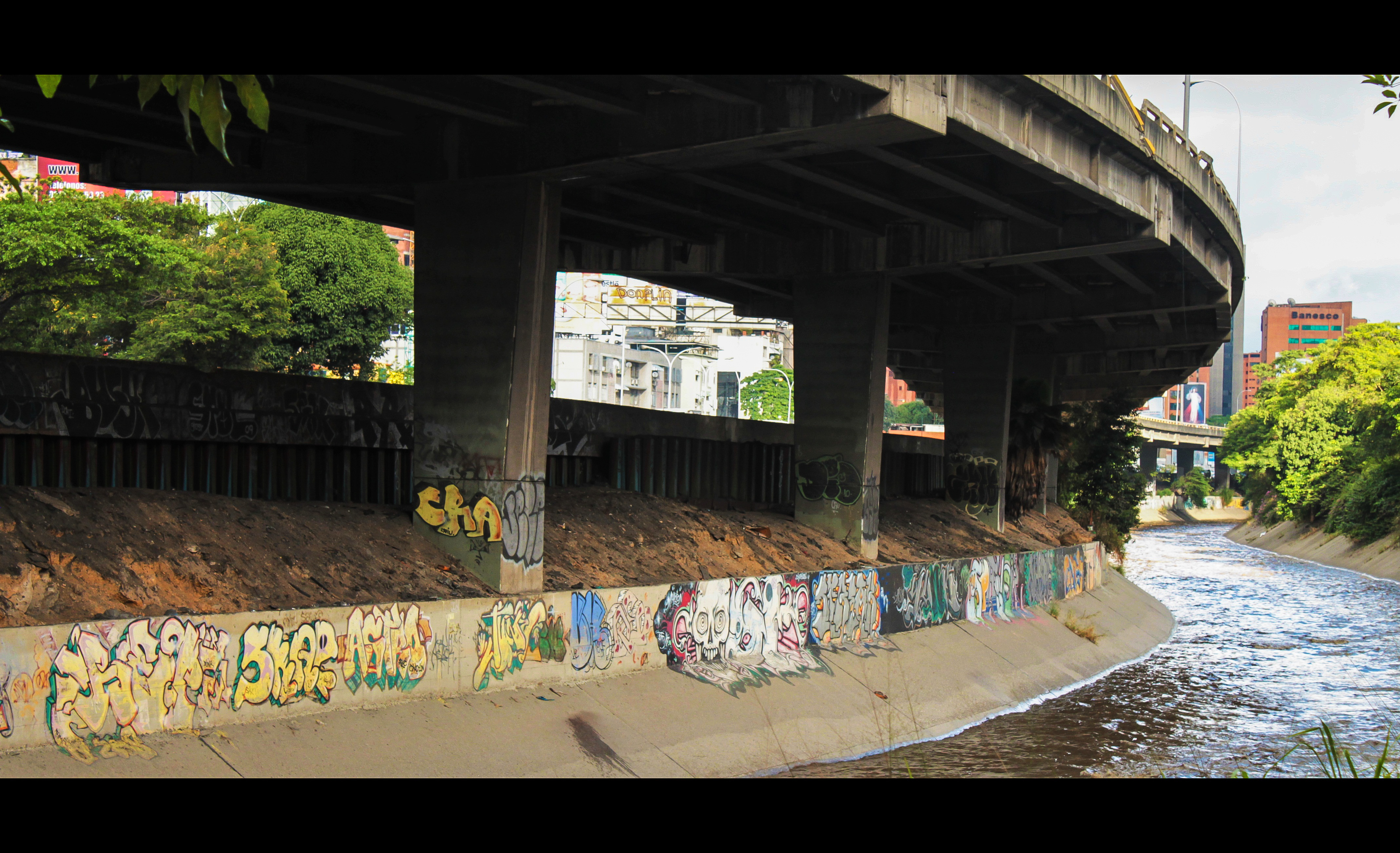
The Guaire River in Bello Monte, where protesters crossed following tear gas barrages

Later in the evening, a National Guardsman was killed south of Caracas, the first official killed in the year's protests, with the day's deaths raising the death toll of 2017 protests to at least 8 people. By 9:00pm, the Penal Forum stated that 521 Venezuelans had been arrested throughout the day, bringing the number of total arrests since the beginning of the year to over 1,000.

== Aftermath ==
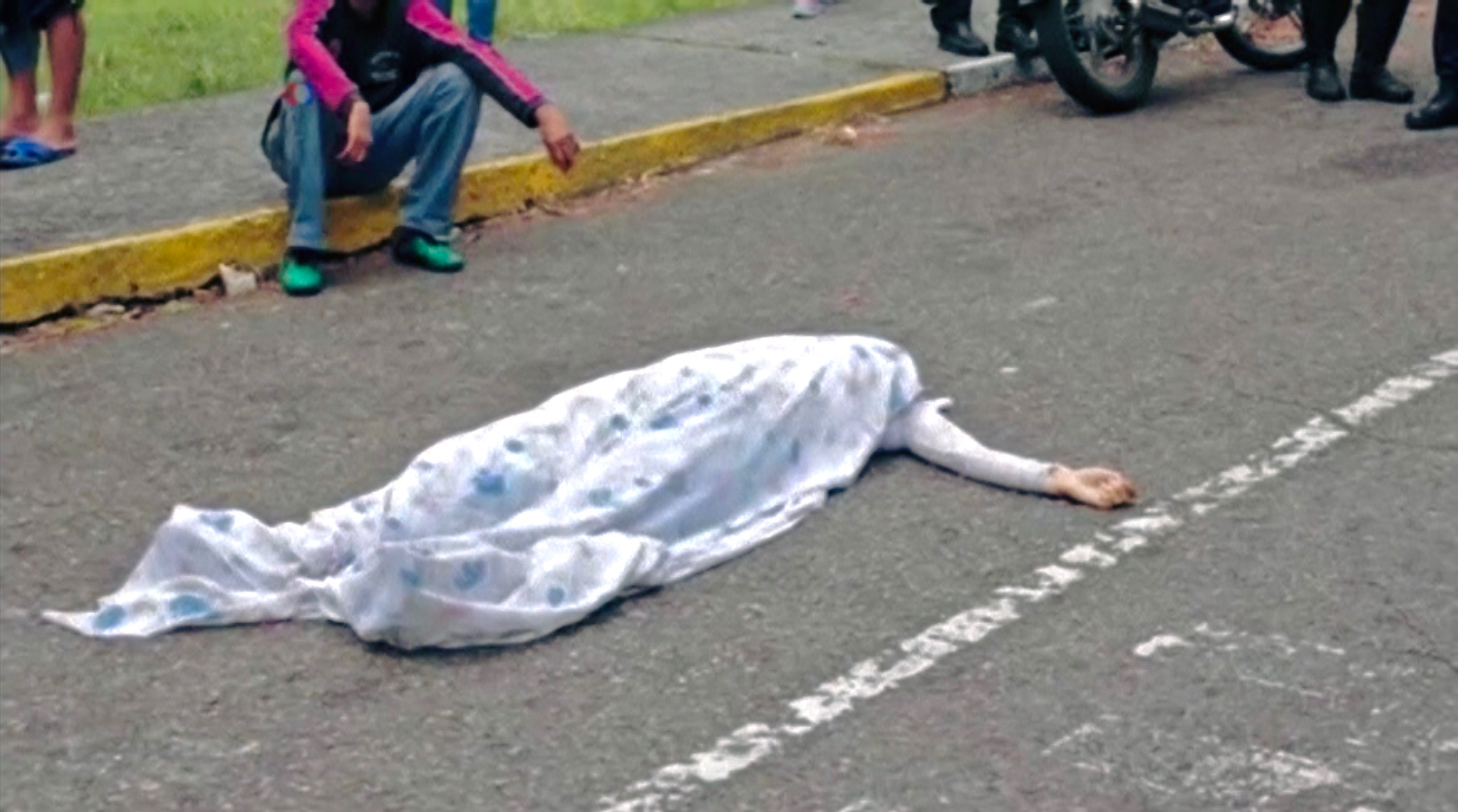
Paola Ramírez's covered body after she was killed

Following the protests, President Maduro retweeted a tweet by a pro-government journalist joking about opposition protesters having to leap into the sewage-filled Guaire River in order to flee barrages of tear gas. In messages between a Twitter user and PSUV minister and former head of Caracas' Capital District, Jacqueline Faría, the user asked where the $1.4 billion supposedly invested into the Guaire River went, with Faría stating "They were completely invested, but ask your people who had a yummy bath!"

The following day on 20 April, Venezuelans were once again called to the streets to protest peacefully, with many thousands participating. As night fell, however, riots began to occur into the early hours of 21 April, with looters from working-class neighborhoods prowling the streets of Caracas' various districts and clashing with Venezuelan authorities, with The New York Times stating that the poor's "bitterness against the government" had culminated into the violence against authorities. The streets of Caracas burned and tear gas filled the atmosphere, forcing one maternity hospital to evacuate to avoid intoxicating fumes. By the end of the night, at least 12 people were killed in the rioting.

On 21 April during the funeral of Paola Ramírez, her parents were taken by CICPC and interrogated following their comments that she had called them minutes before her death, stating that colectivos were pursuing her. Their testimony contrasted Interior Minister Néstor Reverol's statement, who said that a member of an opposition party killed Ramírez.

=== "Tank Woman" ===
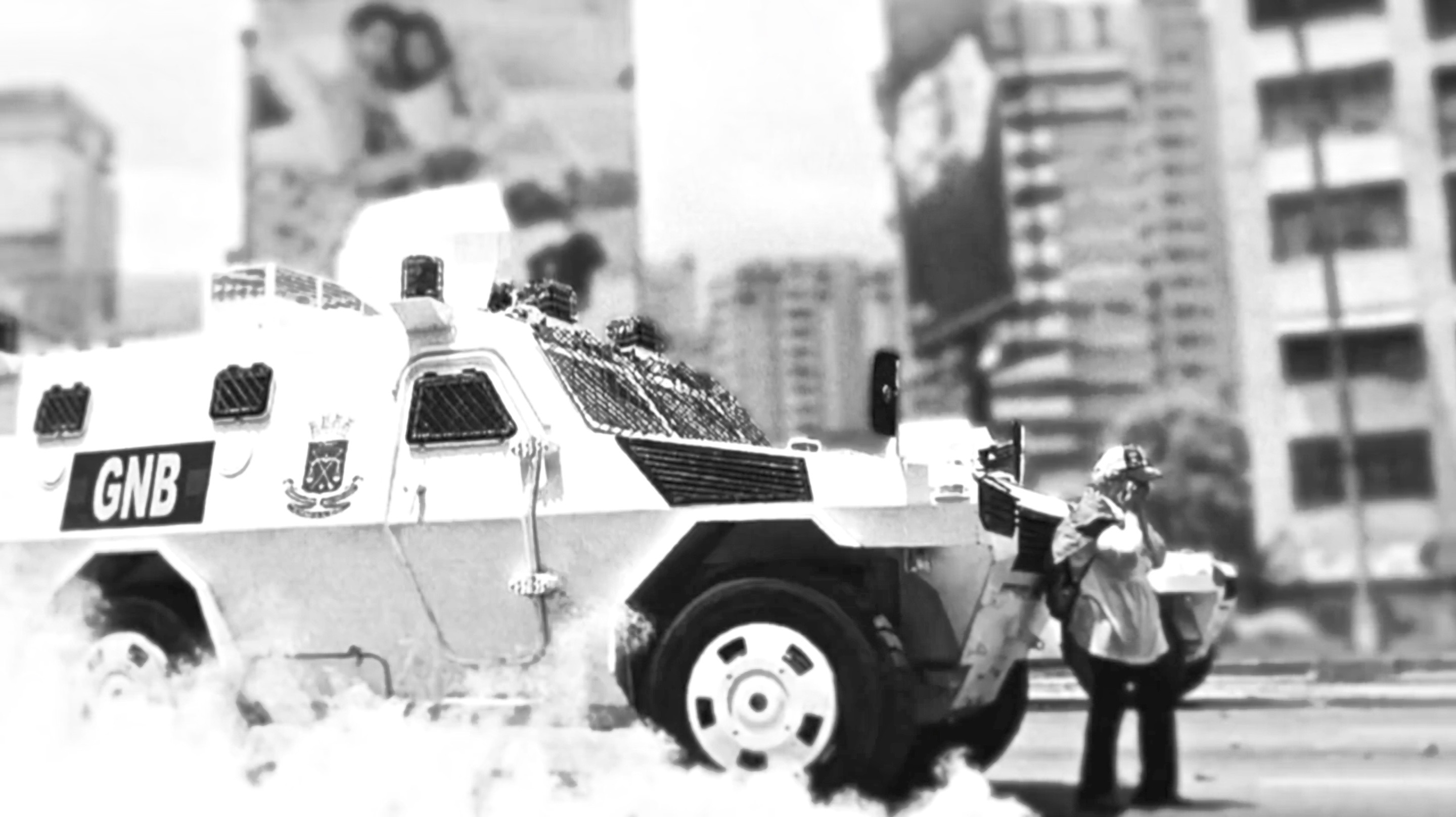
The "Tank Woman"

Images of an elderly woman blocking a VN-4 riot vehicle was compared to images of the Tank Man during the Tiananmen Square protests of 1989 and became a symbol of the protest. The woman saw the vehicles being let through a National Guard barricade and stood in the way of one of the vehicles. Despite National Guardsmen dropping tear gas canisters near her and nudging the woman with their vehicle, the woman stood to prevent the advancement of the vehicle. The woman was later arrested, released shortly after and continued protesting the following days.

== Reactions ==
=== International ===
==== Supranational bodies ====
- European Union –The body condemned the violence and called "on all Venezuelans to unite to deescalate the situation and find democratic solutions within the framework of the constitution".

==== Governments ====
- Colombia – President Juan Manuel Santos shared comments on social media, stating that "I warned Chávez 6 years ago that the Bolivarian revolution failed" and that there was "serious concern" over President Maduro's plans to expand the National Militia.
- Germany – The German Foreign Ministry regretted the three deaths during the day's protests, condemned violence and stated that President Maduro must release political prisoners, recognize the National Assembly and establish an electoral calendar, saying that these moves "will set the conditions for resuming the national dialogue".
- Peru – President Pedro Pablo Kuczynski stated, "We do not want to interfere in the situation of another brother country, but there must be no political prisoners or deaths in the demonstrations ... we will help you if you need it. We are all here with you".
