= The Binary Guardians =

Venezuelan hacktivist group

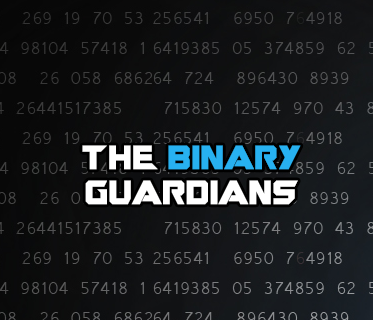
- Formation: c. 2017
- Type: Virtual community
- Purpose: Internet activism
- Region served: Venezuela

The Binary Guardians are a group of hackers that have claimed responsibility for several attacks to government and private websites in Venezuela. The group is made of informatic security analysts with several years of experience. In August 2017, the group hacked a large number of Venezuelan government websites and posted messages in support of the attack on Fort Paramacay, codenamed Operation David.
