= Bolivarian Militia of Venezuela =

- Milicia Nacional Bolivariana de Venezuela
- The Coat of Arms of the National Militia since 2011
- Founded: April 13, 2009; 17 years ago
- Country: Venezuela
- Allegiance: President of Venezuela
- Branch: Paramilitary Militia
- Type: Light infantry and military reserve
- Role: Home defense, security of government facilities, reserve force of the Armed Forces
- Size: Over 4 million militia personnel
- Part of: National Bolivarian Armed Forces of Venezuela under the Ministry of People's Power for Defense
- Garrison/HQ: Caracas
- Patron: Our Lady the Divine Sheperdess
- Motto: Donde el Pueblo puede (Where the people can)
- Colors: Black, White and Red
- Anniversaries: April 13, National Militia Day
- Engagements: Essequibo crisis (2023–2024); United States–Venezuela conflict

Insignia
- Flag

The Bolivarian Militia of Venezuela is a militia branch of the National Bolivarian Armed Forces of Venezuela. Its headquarters is at the National Military Museum, Fort Montana, Caracas. The Commanding General of the National Militia is Major General Orlando Ramón Romero Bolívar, as of August 2024. The National Militia celebrates its anniversary every April 13 yearly.

== Mission ==
According to the Article 46 of the organic law establishing the Militia, its functions are:

- Enlist, organize, equip, instruct, train and retrain formed units of the National Bolivarian Militia;
- Establish permanent links between the National Bolivarian Armed Forces and the Venezuelan people, in order to contribute to ensuring the overall defence of Venezuela;
- Organize and train the Territorial Militia's personnel and unit to implement the comprehensive defense operations to ensure the defense of sovereignty and national independence;
- Contribute to the Operational Strategic Command, in the development and implementation of plans for integral defence of the Nation and National Mobilization;
- Participate and contribute to the development of technology and military industry, without restrictions other than those provided for in the Constitution of the Republic and the laws;
- Guide, coordinate and support community councils in the areas of competence in order to assist in the implementation of public policies;
- Contribute and advise on the establishment and consolidation of integral defence committees of communal councils in order to strengthen the civil-military union;
- Collect, process and disseminate information and consolidation of community councils, public institutions and private sector, necessary for the development of plans, programs, projects of integral development of the Nation and National Mobilization;
- Coordinate with the organs, bodies and agencies of the public and private sectors, the creation and organization of the Combatant Corps, which administratively depend thereon, in order to contribute to the overall defence of the Nation; supervise and train the Combatant Corps, which report directly to Headquarters, National Militia,
- Other duties specified by laws and regulations of the Republic as authorized by proper authorities and enacted by the National Assembly.

== Organization ==
The General Command of the National Militia is divided in three branches of its own plus a fourth branch divided into the first two:

- The National Reserve Service, consisting of all Venezuelan citizens who are not in active military service, or have completed national military service, or who voluntarily join the reserve units (all active reserve units are not part of the NM but of the service branches of the NAF)
- The Territorial Guard Component, consisting of all Venezuelan citizens who voluntarily serve to organize local resistance to any external threat to the nation. These are divided into the Special Resistance Combatant Corps, aimed at the wartime and peacetime defense of public institutions and state and private enterprises, and the Workers' Territorial Militia Components divided into:
  - General Employment Militia Detachments, the mobile quick action component stationed in all the states of Venezuela, metropolitan areas and cities
  - Territorial Employment Militia Battalions, stationed strategically in key cities and townships in Venezuela and areas of key importance
  - Community Militia Detachments, stationed in all townships and cities in all the states of Venezuela, mandated to keep the public order and defend government institutions and economical assets like factories
  - Rural Employment Militia Battalions, stationed in all public farmlands
- The People's Navy Branch, raised in 2013, which is the naval militia component that is mandated towards the defense of the Venezuelan coastline and territorial waters, itself divided into the Naval Reserve Command (part of the NRS) and the Workers' Naval Employment Territorial Militia Battalions, part of the TGC
- The People's National Defense Corps, raised in 2018, which serves as the operational reserve of the National Armed Forces in protecting public order and security

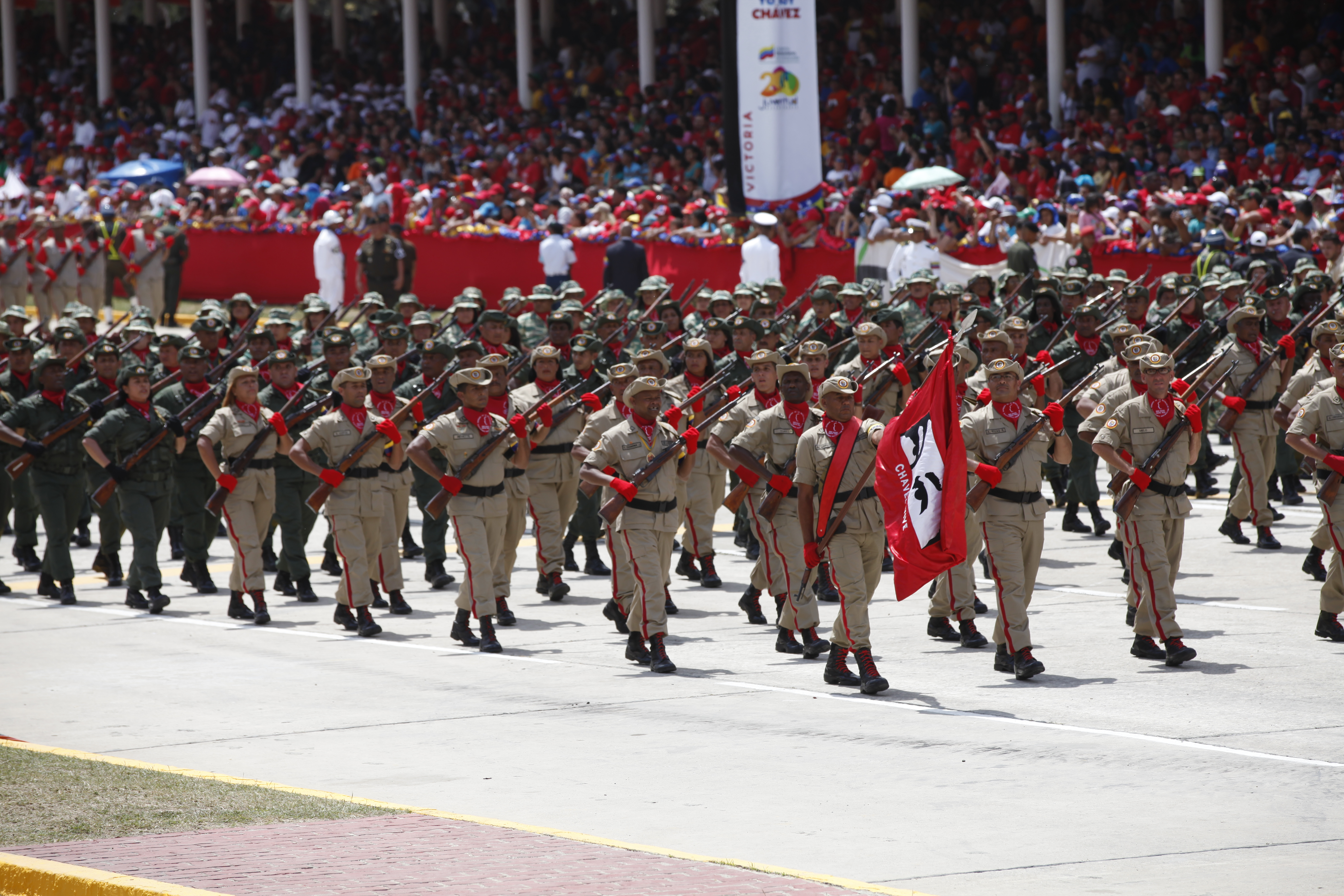
Venezuelan National Militia in Caracas, Venezuela on 5 March 2014 during the commemoration of Hugo Chavez's death.

Today the General Command of the National Militia is organized on the basis of nine Reserve brigades, present throughout the national territory, dozen Special Resistance Corps (grouped around workers contingents of state and private sector enterprises and national institutions at all levels) plus the territorial national service militia commands mentioned, and even a newly created national guards brigade, and in the future, armor and aviation units.

It is an autonomous and auxiliary force for the Armed Forces' service branches, with its own chain of command and service arms, reporting directly to the President, the Minister of Defense and the Operational Strategic Command. It can be estimated at the present time about 400,000 men and women are on various training levels. The target of its authorities is to reach 1,100,000 part-time servicemen and women in the coming years. Today more than 160,000 men and women serve actively in the militia, with plans to have a half-a-million-strong active force of reserve national servicemen and women in 2015.

Following the 2017 Venezuelan constitutional crisis and its subsequent protests, President Maduro announced the expansion of the militia to include 500,000 personnel, stating that the government would purchase a new rifle for each militiaman, with plans to increase its personnel numbers to about over a million active service personnel plus an undetermined number of reserves.

In December 2018, Maduro claimed that the militia grew by 1.6 million members. He said during a speech that he would extensively arm the militia.

== Controversy ==
- The National Boliviarian Militia has been described as a "political army" created by Hugo Chávez that has hundreds of thousands of members in service, including military reservists and employees of state and public enterprises at all levels. The militia is "under the direct command of the president" as the Commander in Chief of the National Armed Forces, through the authority of the Defense Minister and the Commandant of the Operational Strategic Command, and "are trained to defend the (Bolivarian) revolution of internal and external enemies". It has been alleged by El Mundo that the militia has sometimes used "violence to silence dissent or journalists who do not bow to the discourse of the regime".

== Ranks ==
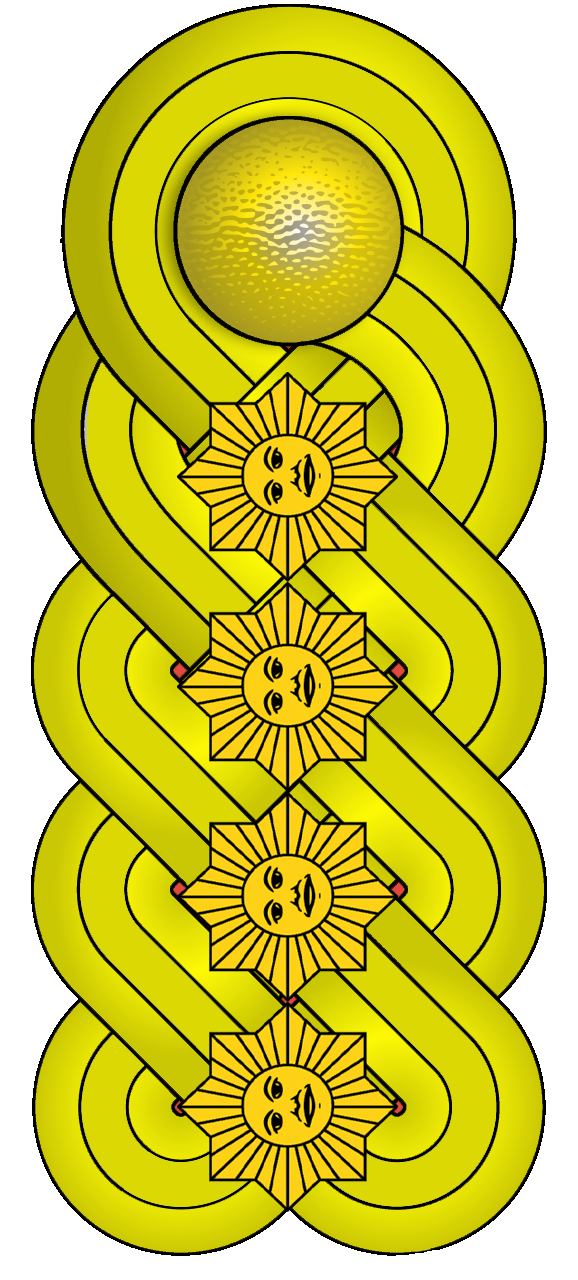
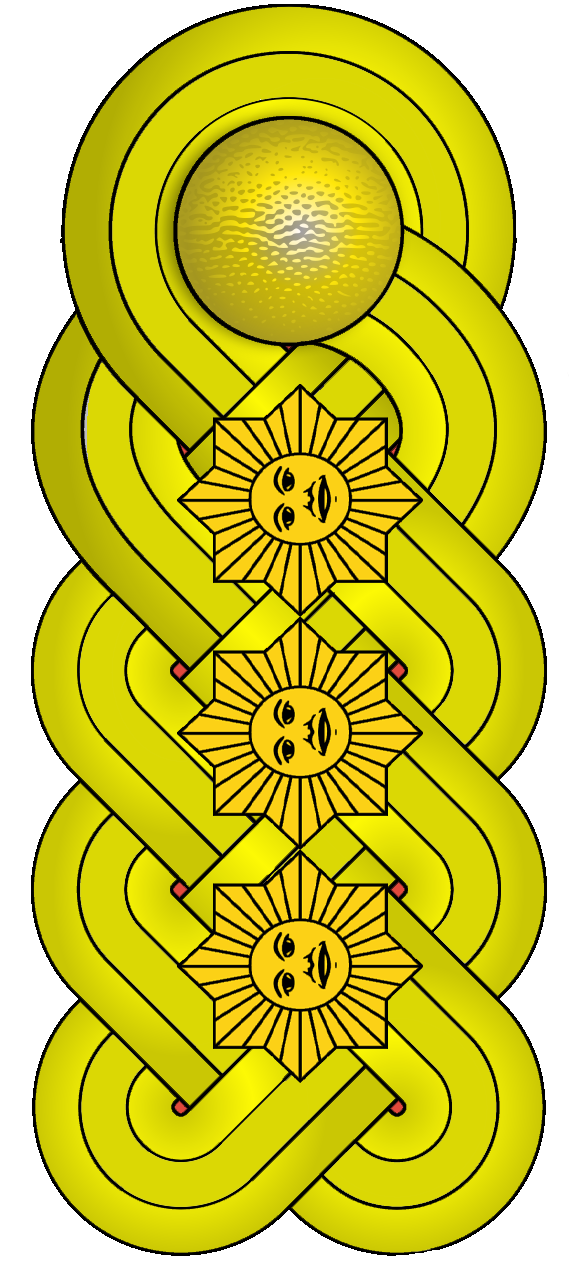
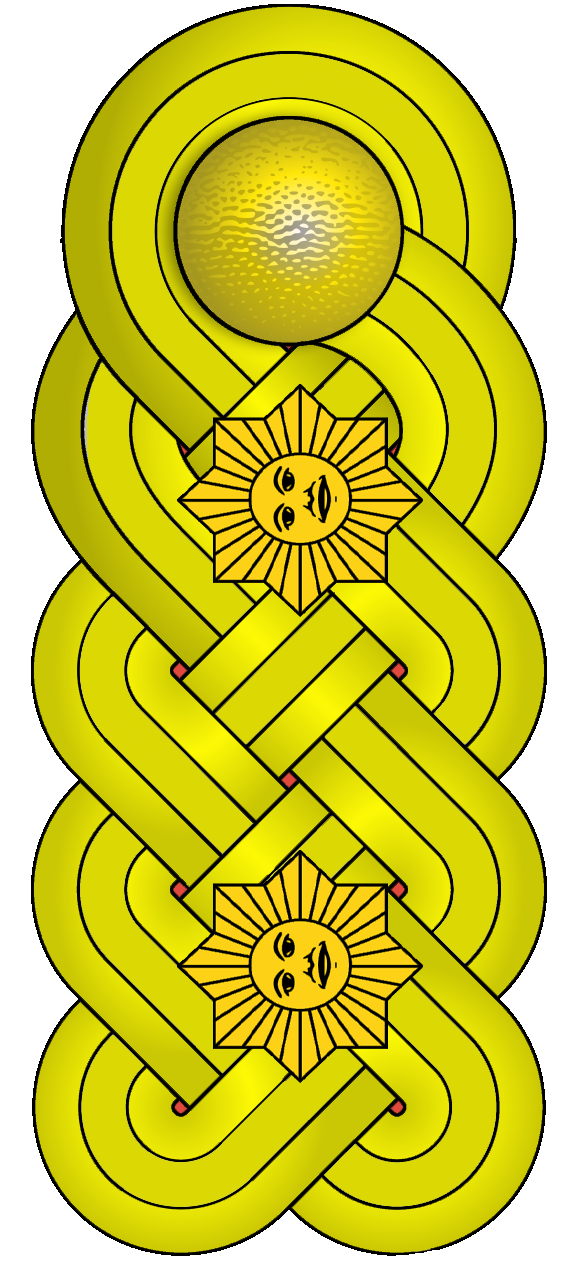
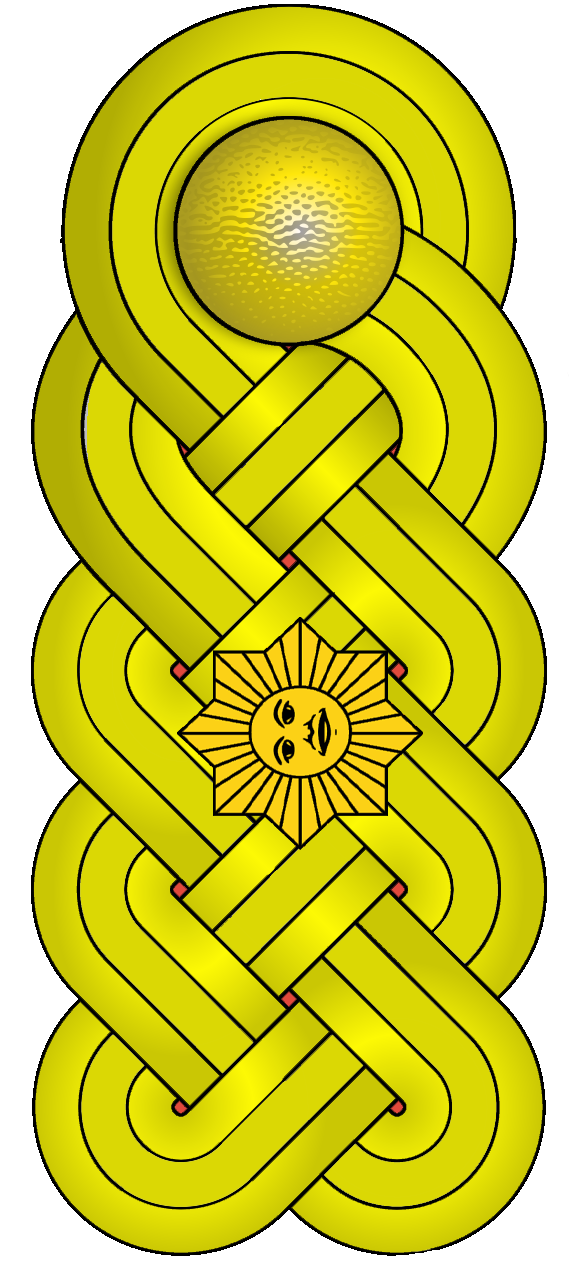
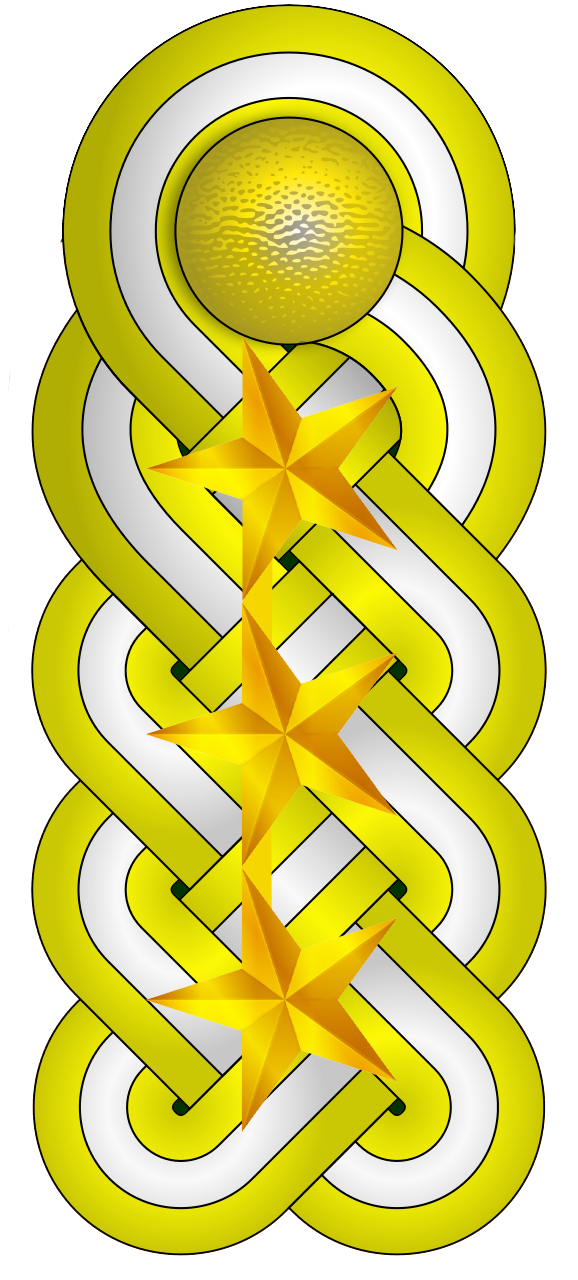
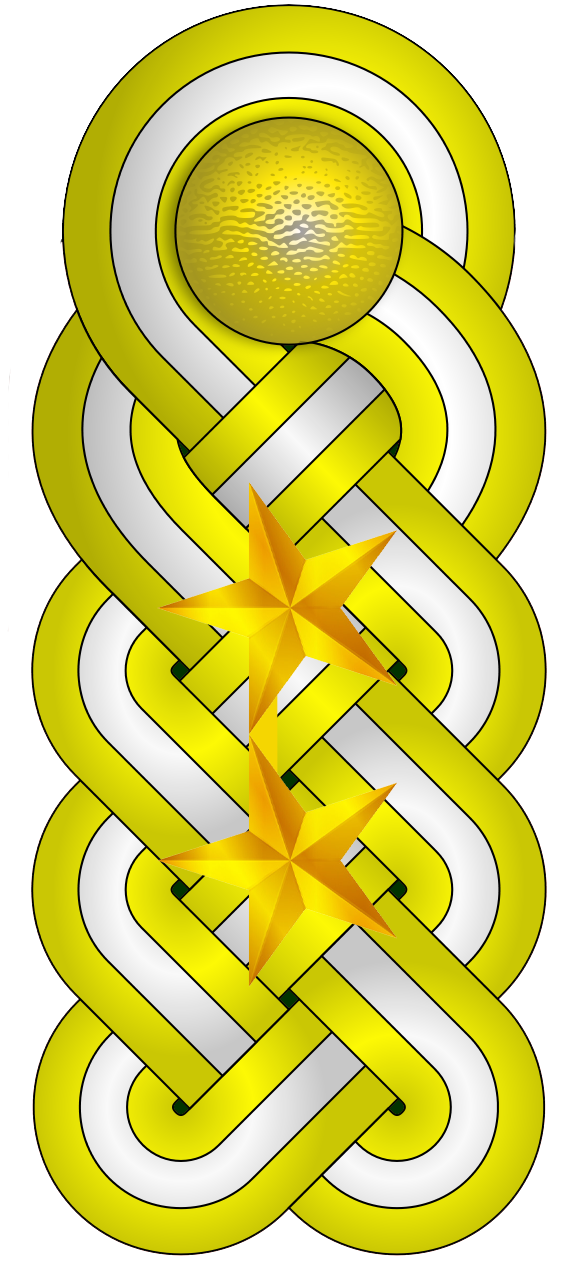
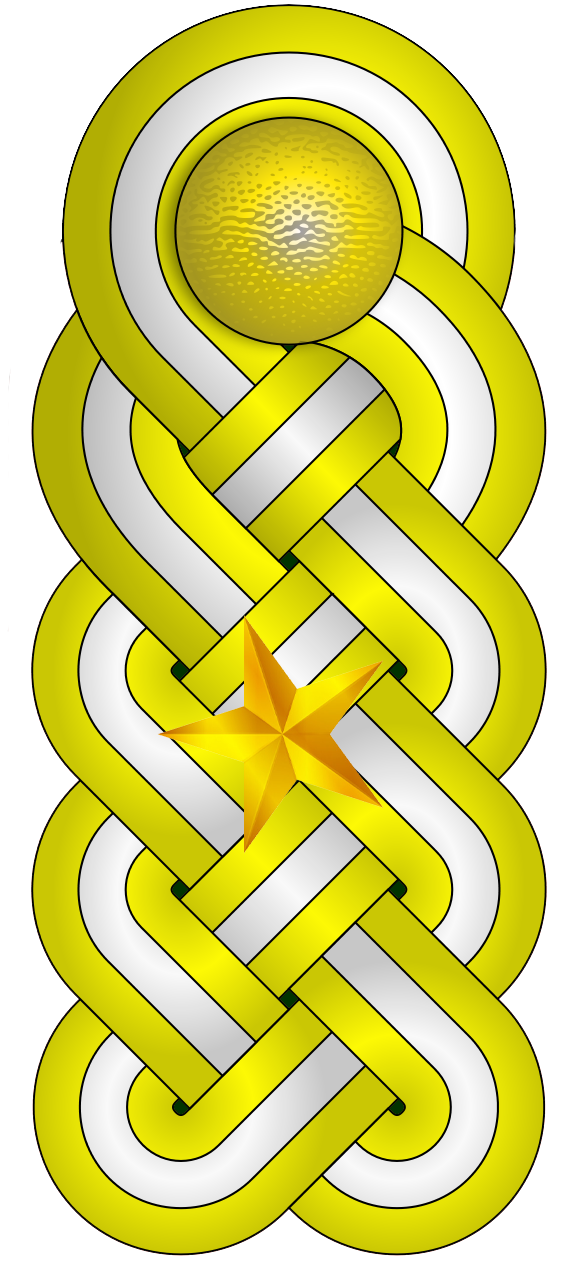
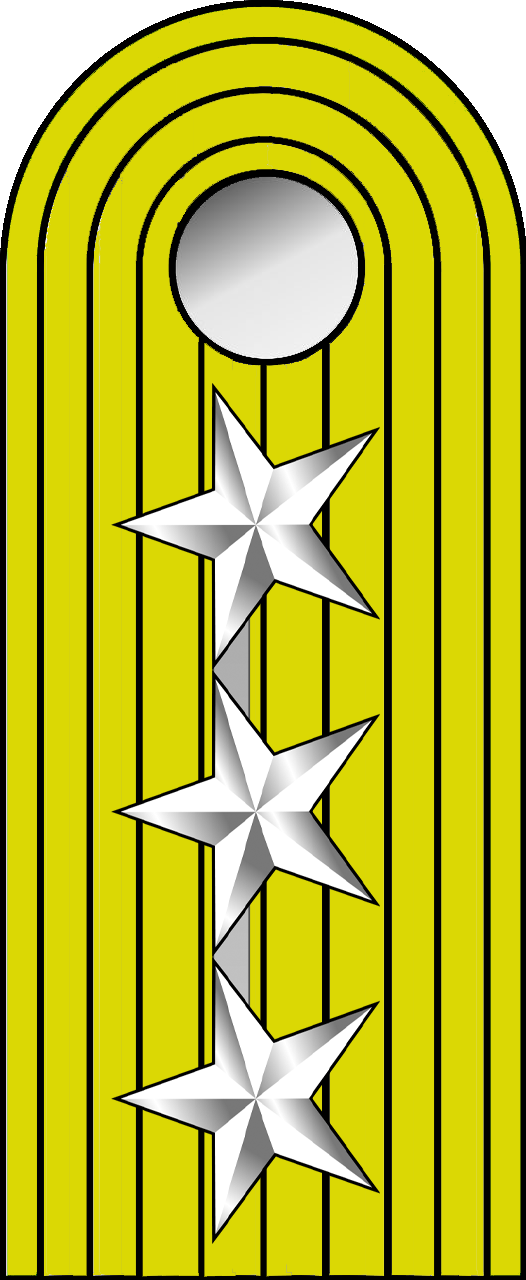
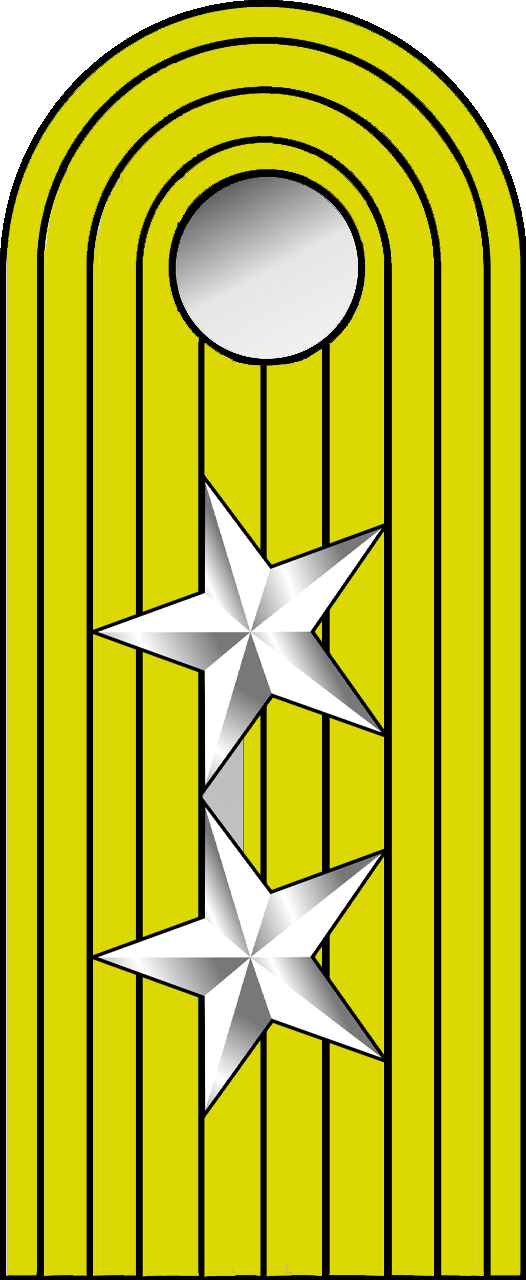
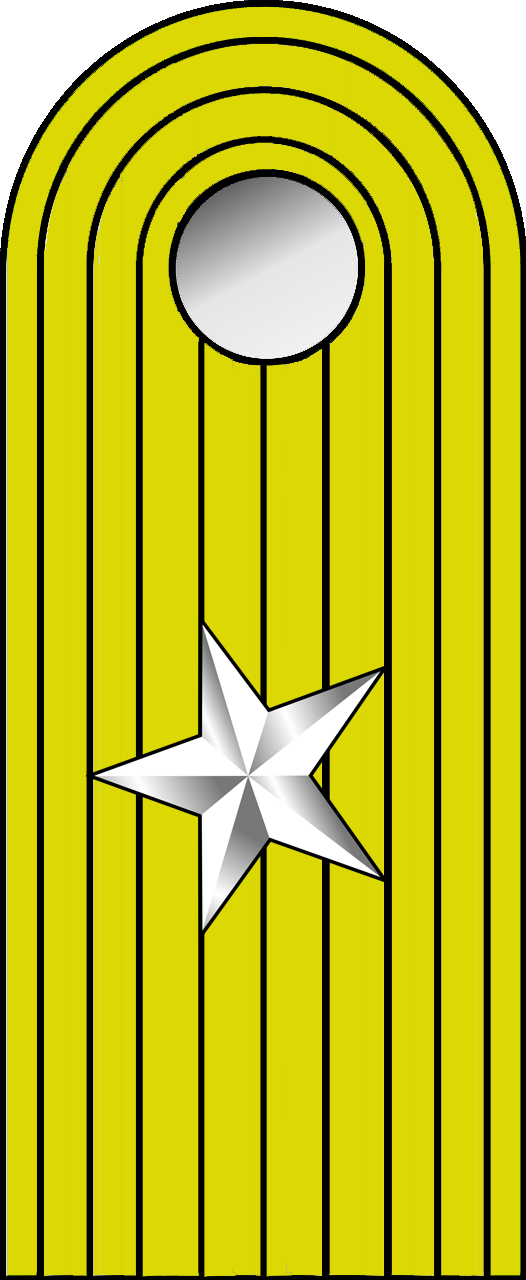
| Rank group | General / flag officers | | | | Senior officers | | | Junior officers |
|---|---|---|---|---|---|---|---|---|---|---|
| Venezuelan Army |
| Venezuelan Army | General en jefe | Mayor general | General de division | General de brigada | Coronel | Teniente coronel | Mayor | Capitán | Primer teniente | Teniente |

| Rank group | General / flag officers | | | | Senior officers | | Junior officers |
|---|---|---|---|---|---|---|---|---|---|---|---|
| Bolivarian Militia of Venezuela (Ground element) | | | | | | | | | | | No insignia |
| Bolivarian Militia of Venezuela (Ground element) | Sargento supervisor | Sargento ayudante | Sargento mayor de primera | Sargento mayor de segunda | Sargento mayor de tercera | Sargento primero | Sargento segundo | Cabo primero | Cabo segundo | Distinguido | Miliciano |

== Equipment of the National Militia ==
=== Infantry weapons ===
Sidearms
| Origin | Model | Type | Notes | Photo |
|---|---|---|---|---|
| Germany | SIG Sauer P226 | 9x19mm Parabellum semi-automatic handgun | | |
| Italy | Beretta 92 | 9x19mm Parabellum semi-automatic handgun | | |
Assault Rifles
| Belgium VEN | FN FAL | 7.62x51 mm Battle rifle | 60,000 delivered, 300,000+ produced locally (Being phased out by the AK-103 by the rest of the NAF, service battle rifle of the NM) | |
| Belgium | FN FNC | 5.56×45mm NATO Assault Rifle | 50,000+ delivered, service assault rifle of the NM | |
| Soviet Union | Mosin-Nagant M91/30 | 7.62×54mmR Bolt-action rifle | Undetermined number used, Rural service standard-issue rifle | |
| Soviet Union | AKM | 7.62×39mm Assault Rifle | Unknown number East German model MPI KMS-72 and MPI KM-72 | |
Machine Guns
| Belgium | FN MINIMI | MINIMI | Unknown number, used by the TGC-SRC | |
| Belgium | FN MAG | MAG | Unknown number, used by the TGC-SRC | |
Portable anti-materiel weapons
| Russia | 9K338 Igla-S (SA-24 Grinch) | 72mm | Increasingly being adopted by battalions of the NM as standard MANPADS weapon | |
| Sweden | AT4 | 84×1020mm | Seen in 2018 Independence day parade | |

== See also ==
- Fedayeen Saddam
- Iranian Revolutionary Guard Corps
- National Defence Forces
