= Timeline of the 2017 Venezuelan protests =

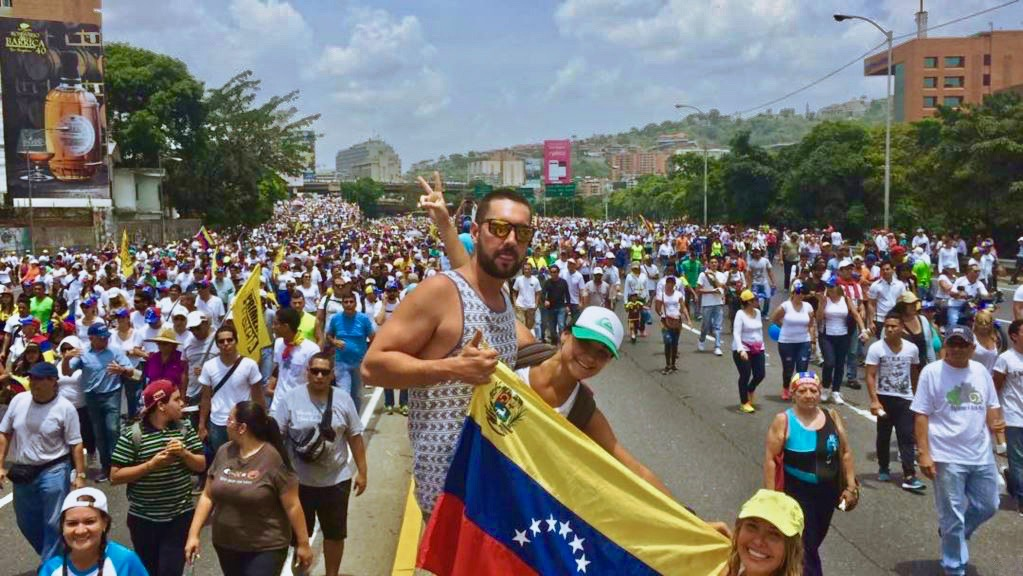
Image facing east on the Francisco Fajardo Freeway

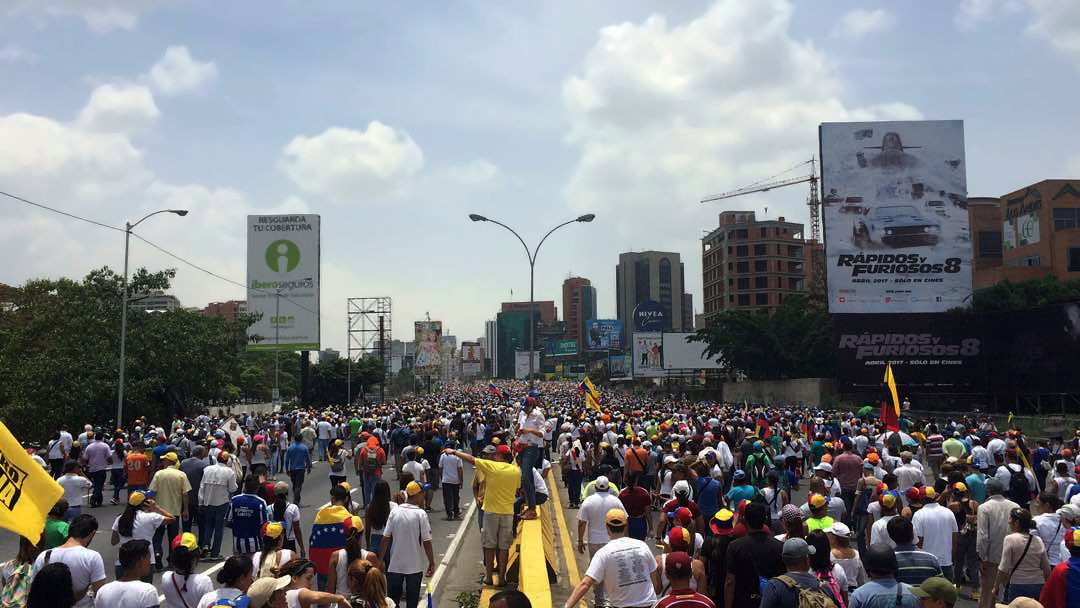
Facing west in same position during Mother of All Marches

The 2017 Venezuelan protests began in late January following the abandonment of Vatican-backed dialogue between the Bolivarian government and the opposition. The series of protests originally began in February 2014 when hundreds of thousands of Venezuelans protested due to high levels of criminal violence, inflation, and chronic scarcity of basic goods because of policies created by the Venezuelan government though the size of protests had decreased since 2014. Following the 2017 Venezuelan constitutional crisis, protests began to increase greatly throughout Venezuela.

The opposition protests demanded immediate presidential elections to be held following controversy surrounding the prohibition to recall President Nicolás Maduro. The protests are listed below according to the month they had happened.

== January ==
- 9 January – The National Assembly declares President Maduro of abandoning his office, accusing him of "breach of the constitutional and democratic order, the violation of Human Rights and the devastation of the economic and social foundations of the nation".
- 11 January – President Maduro declares the opposition-led National Assembly "self-dissolved" following their ruling that he had abandoned the presidency.
- 12 January – Multiple opposition leaders and members are arrested by the Venezuelan government for allegedly attempting to overthrow the government, with individuals including former general Raul Baduel. Opposition leader Henrique Capriles Radonski states that the Maduro administration is attempting to bar opposition politicians from being in office. Democratic Unity Roundtable Secretary General, Jesús Torrealba, stated that demonstrations would be held on 23 January 2017 on the anniversary of the fall of Marcos Pérez Jiménez's dictatorship, with Torrealba stating "there will be a national mobilization demanding democracy before the authoritarian regime".
- 13 January –Following the arrests of opposition members, a scheduled dialogue session between the opposition and Bolivarian government is cancelled.
- 19 January – The Vatican officially pulls out of the dialogue process between the Bolivarian government and the opposition, essentially ending talks between both parties.
- 20 January-Following the election of Donald Trump as President of the United States, the Venezuelan government gifted $500,000 toward Donald Trump's inauguration on 20 January 2017.

This is our last conventional protest, the next ones, well, those will be surprise ones.

— Henrique Capriles Radonski
- 23 January – Several thousand Venezuelans protested throughout the country, with numbers much smaller than the previous year due to fear of repression and discouragement, along with reports that protesters were stopped by government checkpoints en route to the demonstration. The Bolivarian government had also cordoned of the planned march areas with police and closed all subway and transportation systems to the area. Opposition leader Henrique Capriles announces that the days march would be the last official march, with future demonstrations potentially occurring by "surprise".
- 24 January – The first surprise demonstration occurs with only hundreds of Venezuelans attending, blocking the Francisco Fajardo highway in both directions holding a sign saying "Elections now", with Venezuelan authorities not being able to respond until an hour later when the protest was peacefully broken up.
- 27 January – Members of the opposition-led National Assembly gathered for a meeting in the Caracas slum of Petare, one of the largest slums in the world, rebuking Russian rhetoric that regarded opposition protests as a "color revolution".

== February ==
- 1 February – President Maduro announces that the Bolivarian National Militia would be directed towards an anti-protest objective, saying that his supporters "will multiply throughout the territory, special forces of rapid action, special troops of the militias ... to make our homeland impregnable".
- 12 February – Student leaders called for protests on 12 February, commemorating three years of national protests called La Salida, with marches in Caracas planned to pass by the area where student Robert Redman was killed on the first day of protests. Later, opposition deputies attempted to enter the CNE headquarters to present a document demanding a time frame of regional and municipal elections, with National Guardsmen responding violently towards the deputies after the politicians attempted to enter past them.
- 16 February - The Supreme Tribunal of Justice upholds a 13-year and 9-month prison sentence on Popular Will founder, Leopoldo López for inciting violence by "subliminal messages" at the 2014 anti-government protests. US President Donald Trump demands Venezuela release him.

== March ==
Students protesting against rulings outside of the TSJ on 31 March 2017.

- 22 March –In Los Ruices, Venezuelans suffering from chronic diseases protested outside of a social security pharmacy due to the shortages of medication facing the country.
- 29 March – The 2017 Venezuelan constitutional crisis begins, with immunity being taken away from opposition parliamentarians by the Supreme Tribunal of Justice of Venezuela (TSJ), with the TSJ assuming legislative powers of the opposition-controlled National Assembly.
- 30 March -Deputy spokesperson for the U.S. Department of State Mark Toner expressed disapproval on behalf of the United States by stating the U.S. considered the dissolution of the Venezuelan National Assembly as "a serious setback for democracy" in the country, further stating "The United States condemns the Venezuelan Supreme Court's March 29 decision to usurp the power of the democratically elected National Assembly..."
- 31 March - Attorney general, Luisa Ortega Díaz denounces the dissolution of the National Assembly with some protesters holding signs saying "No To Dictatorship".

== April ==
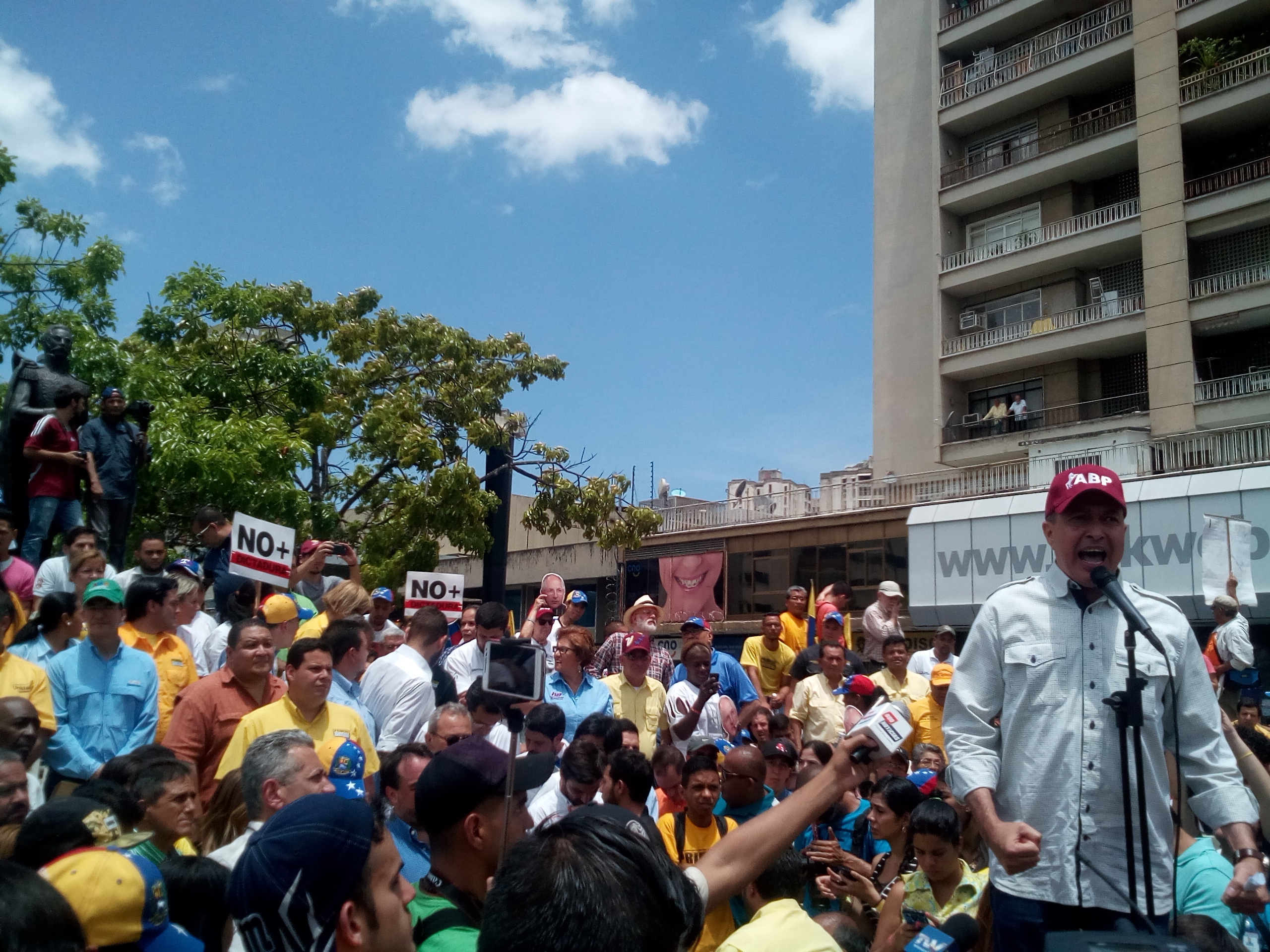
Parliamentaries special session in Brión Square

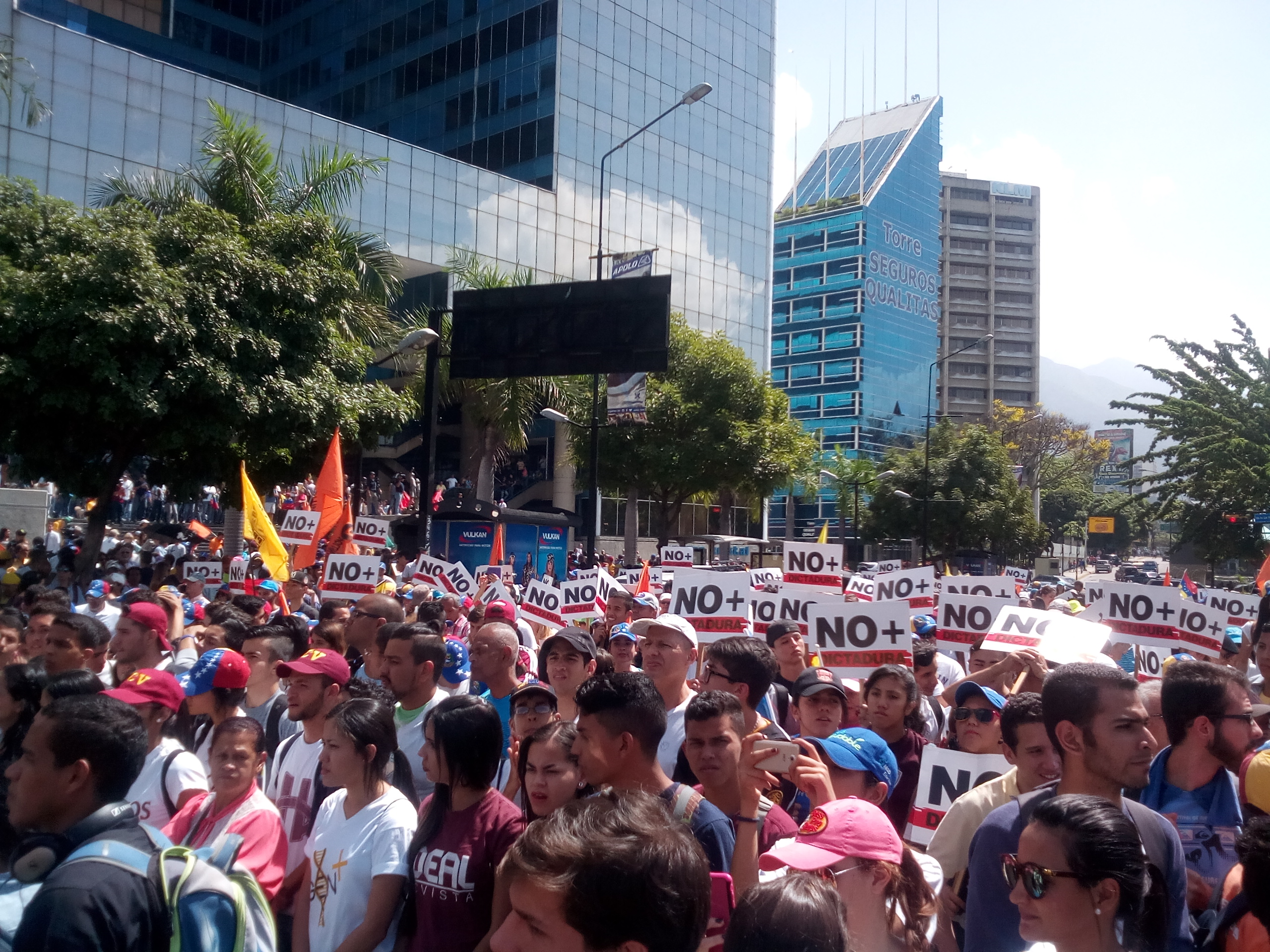
Demonstrators holding signs saying "No more dictatorship"

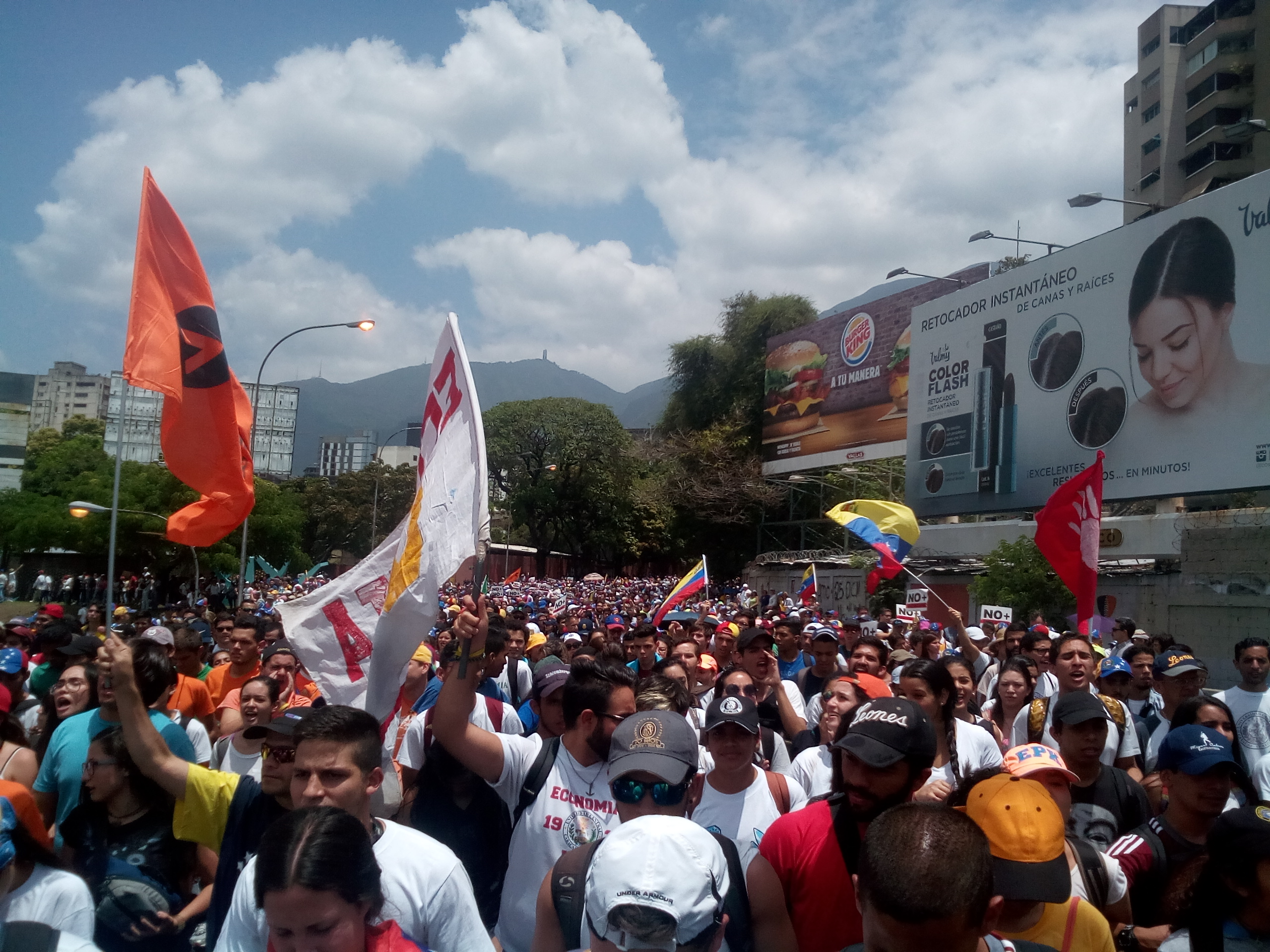
Opposition march on 6 April

- 1 April – The National Assembly holds a special session a calls for a concentration in Brión Square in Caracas to discuss the Supreme Court sentences. Although it was noted that the Supreme Court reversed its decision in following resolutions, the parliamentaries argued that the juridic action was a coup.
- 4 April – The opposition called for a march from Plaza Venezuela to the National Assembly; access to the meeting point was blocked by the Bolivarian National Guard. Twelve Caracas Metro subway stations were closed. Pro-government colectivos blocked opposition marches and fired weapons at protesters, with demonstrations resulting in the injuries of about 42 individuals, including seven police officers, while over 50 people were arrested.
- 5 April – National Guardsmen fired tear gas in the engineering faculty of the University of Carabobo and dispersed a protest, violating the university's autonomy. The rector of the university, the governor of Carabobo and other figures denounced the actions. There were 14 injured and 4 arrests during the protest and classes were suspended indefinitely. Hours later the detainees were released.
- 6 April – Jairo Ortiz, a 19-year-old student of the Universidad Experimental Politécnica (UNEXPO), was shot and killed while protesting in Carrizal, Miranda.
- 7 April – General Angel Vivas was arrested during a SEBIN operation that tricked him into helping a young man that hit his car into the front door of his house, three years after a detention order was published during the 2014 protests.
- 8 April – During the protests 16 subway stations and 19 Caracas Metrobus routes were closed; Henrique Capriles' campaign command was attacked with tear gas and burned by the Bolivarian Guard and Police. The Supreme Tribunal was attacked by violent protesters during the afternoon, burning furniture, breaking windows and damaging the front door. Although the SEBIN pointed out that Primero Justicia leaders were involved, opposition leaders like Freddy Guevara and David Smolansky denounced the attack.
- 9 April – Secretary General Luis Almagro stated "I can not help but admire the courage of the people in the street. When no one has solved this humanitarian and political crisis, neither by means of mediation nor by rigged dialogues, the people have decided to make their voices heard in the whole continent, as mandated by the Bolivarian Constitution in its Article 350.
- 10 April – Daniel Queliz, a 19-year-old student of the Arturo Michelena University, was shot and killed during a protest in Valencia by a Carabobo Police officer. More than 50 individuals wounded were reported. The National Guard fired tear gas at a clinic after receiving wounded from the protests, including parliamentary Delsa Solórzano, who was hit in the chest by a tear gas canister, affecting patients and forcing a baby to be taken out of the building. PROVEA, opposition leaders and the Ombudsman, Tarek William Saab, denounced that some canisters were fired from helicopters, which is against the Venezuelan Civil Aeronautics Law.
- 11 April –While visiting San Félix, Venezuela, President Maduro had objects thrown at him during a parade while riding in a convertible Tiuna military vehicle. Five persons were detained after the incident. In Barquisimeto, a child and a young man were shot and killed by colectivos during protests, while more than twelve individuals were wounded.
- 12 April –Venezuela's Catholic church called for a calm from violence and denounced violent colectivos, with Archbishop Jorge Urosa Savino saying "the government cannot continue to protect these groups that are acting illegally". Hours later, pro-government individuals stormed the Basilica of St. Teresa in Caracas, attempting to attack Urosa, though parishioners defended him and police arrested those behind the assault.
- 13 April – Two young students and members of Primero Justicia, the Sánchez brothers, were detained. Opposition leaders stated that they were tortured to force them incriminate leaders and parliamentaries. 27 subway stations were closed,
- 14 April –The opposition announced the "Grand March and Great Taking in All States" march to take place on 19 April to "overflow" Caracas.
- 15 April –President Maduro announced that over 2,000 security checkpoints would be established throughout Venezuela prior to the 19 April "mega march", with nearly 200,000 Venezuelan authorities said to be participating.

I order SEBIN to sue those spokesmen of the opposition who are accusing of barbarities and improper acts that are never discussed in this republic.

— President Nicolás Maduro
- 16 April –On Easter, Burning of Judas celebrations occurred, with Venezuelans burning effigies of TSJ judges, President Maduro, Ombudsman Tarek Wiliam Saab and other Bolivarian officials they accused of "betraying" Venezuela. Venezuela's intelligence agency, SEBIN, is ordered by President Maduro to take legal actions against individuals who state that they have tortured by authorities.
- 17 April –President Maduro ordered the expansion of the Venezuelan National Militia to involve 500,000 loyal Venezuelans, stating that each would be armed with a rifle and demanded the prevention of another event similar to the 2002 Venezuelan coup d'état attempt. Diosdado Cabello, a high-level PSUV official loyal to the Bolivarian government, stated that 60,000 motorized colectivos and the National Militia would be spread throughout Caracas on 19 April "until necessary" to deter the opposition's "megamarch", calling their actions "terrorism".

Mother of All Protests

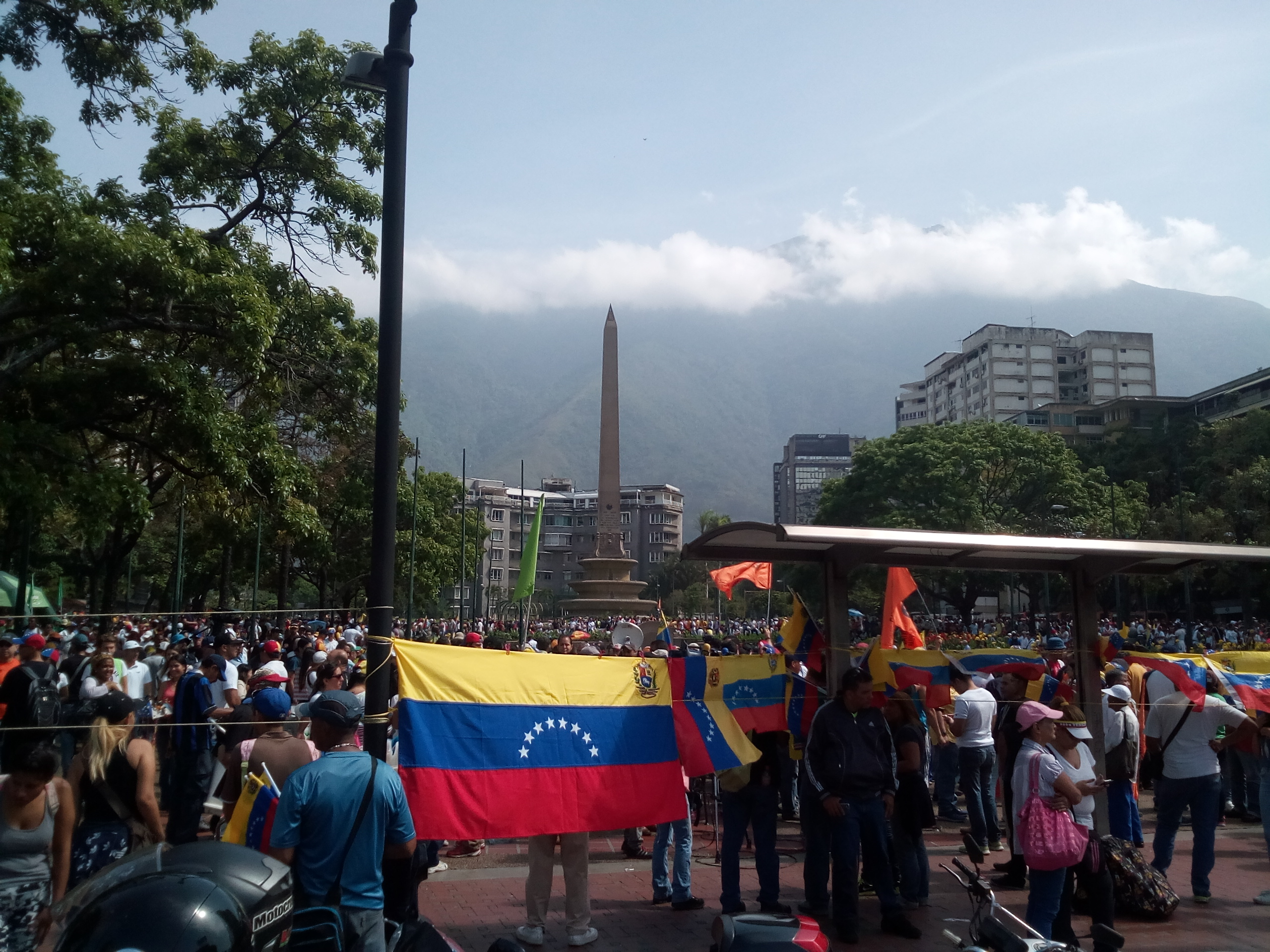
Altamira Square, one of the meeting points of the April 19th 2017 march.

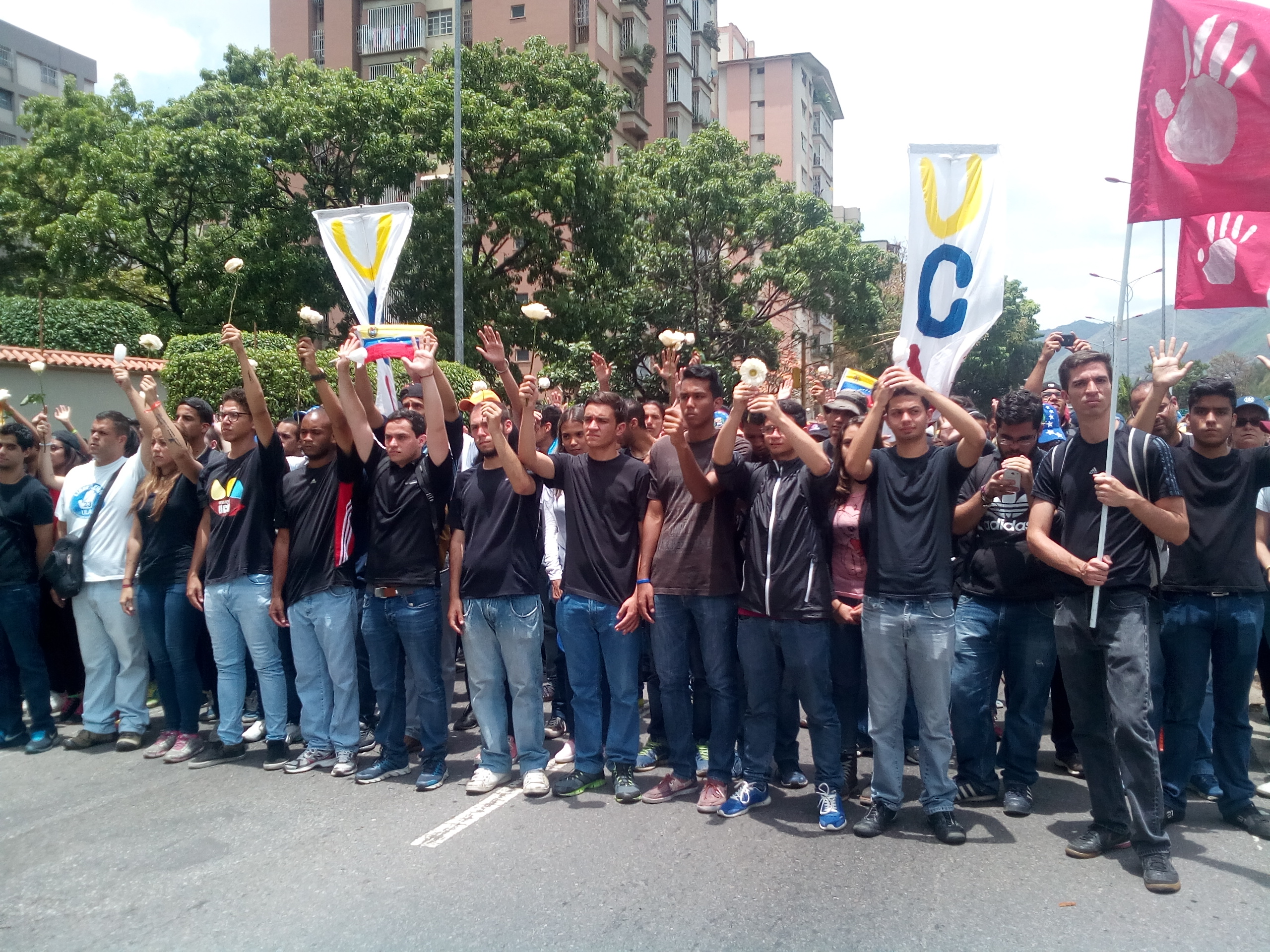
Students wearing black and carrying white roses during the March of Silence.

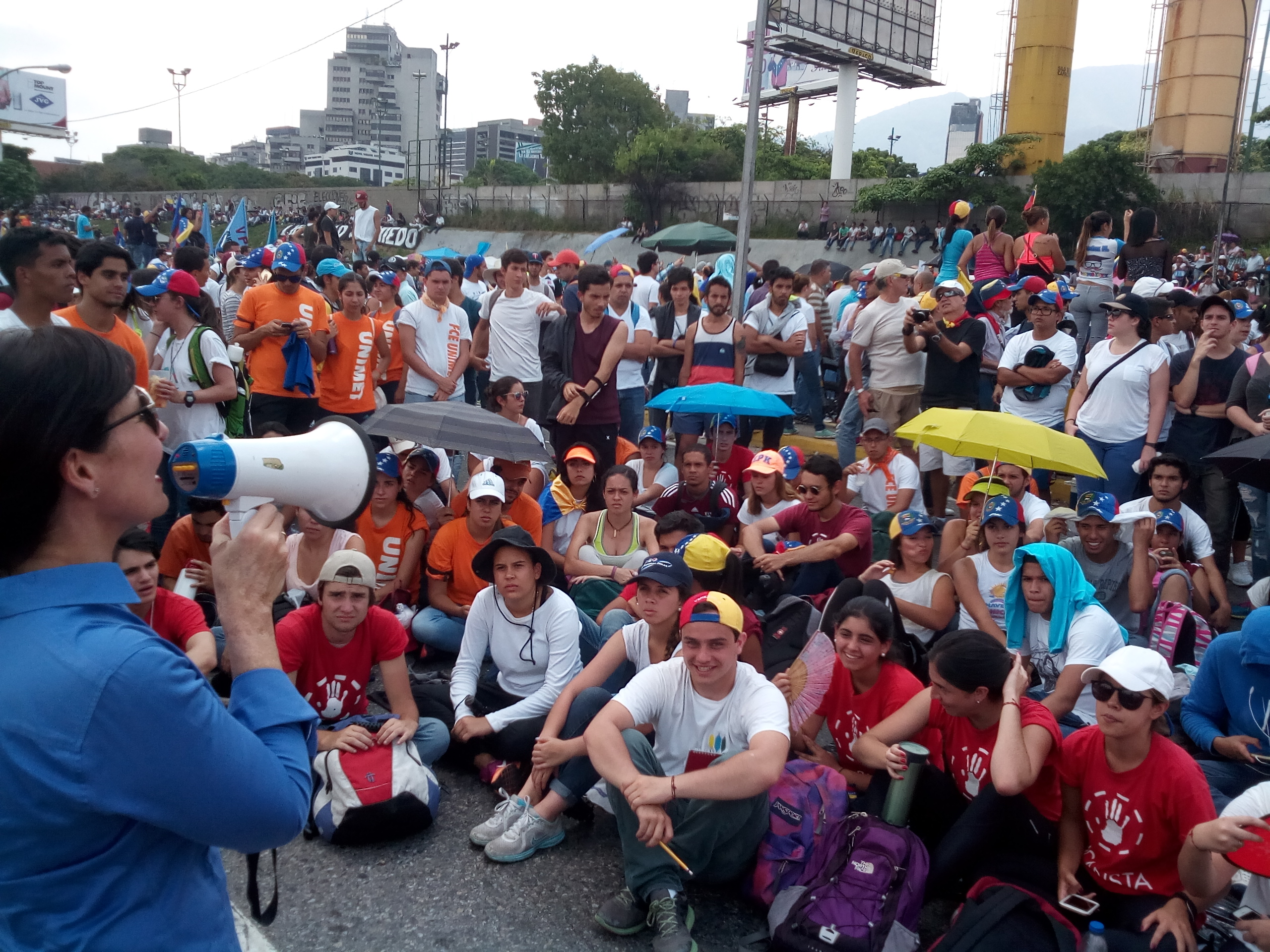
Teacher giving lecture during a sit-in on 24 April.

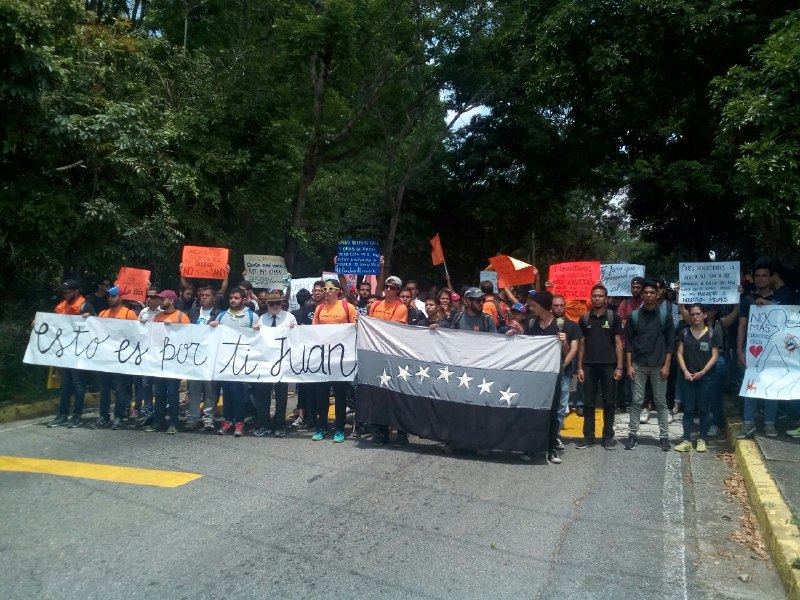
Silent march in honor of Juan Pablo Pernalete on 27 April.

- 19 April –The "mother of all protests," as it was called by organizers, occurred. The day began with demonstrators gathering around the country at about 10:30am, with Caracas having 26 different routes for the main march to head to the office of the Ombudsman to demonstrate. As the march progressed through Caracas, the National Guard began to block routes and fire tear gas at marchers at 11:50am, with the demonstrators refusing to leave despite the use of force.

At about 12:30pm, demonstrations by both opposition and pro-government Venezuelans fill Caracas' avenues. Shortly after 12:45pm, protesters on the Francisco Fajardo Freeway near Bello Monte begin to flee the area after enduring over an hour of tear gas from authorities, with many leaping into the Guaire River, which is used for sewage drainage, to avoid the gas. Near 2:10pm, a 17-year-old boy was shot in the head and killed at a protest. At about 4:35pm, pro-government paramilitaries called colectivos shot and killed Paola Ramirez, a 23-year-old woman who was protesting.
Later in the evening, a National Guardsman was killed south of Caracas, the first authority killed in the year's protests, with the day's deaths raising the death toll of 2017 protests to at least 8 people. By 9:00pm, the Penal Forum stated that 521 Venezuelans had been arrested throughout the day, bringing the number of total arrests since the beginning of the year to over 1,000.
Various observers gave different estimates on the numbers of protesters. The New York Times estimated "thousands of people", several other media outlets (including NBC News and Reuters) stated "hundreds of thousands", and Central University mathematics professor Ricardo Rios estimated at least 1.2 million protesting, which would make it the largest protest in Venezuela's history. According to pollster Meganálisis, 2.5 million Venezuelans protested in Caracas alone, while 6 million protested throughout the country.

- 20–21 April – At least twelve people were killed at the streets of Caracas during lootings. The office of the Venezuelan attorney general said that eleven of those deaths were caused by electrocution and gunshot wounds in El Valle del Espíritu Santo. A district mayor Carlos Ocariz said that one protester was fatally shot in Petare.
- 22 April – Hundreds of thousands of Venezuelans participate in a silent march in memory of those killed, marching from the wealthier east side of Caracas to the west side, the first time demonstrators were able to travel to western Caracas without be barricaded by authorities. Many gathered in the Montalbán municipality of Caracas near the Venezuelan Episcopal Conference. Opposition leaders vowed to keep protesting until new elections are announced.
- 23 April – The Democratic Unity Roundtable announces the plans for the 24 April protest titled "The National Sit-in", with gathering points designated in La Villa, Crema Paraíso de Santa Monica, Plaza Brión de Chacaíto, Caurimare, Santa Fe, Altamira, Unicentro el Marqués and Altamira. Organizers stated that it "is a protest of resistance, not of ruckus", calling for a national standstill and asked marchers be prepared with food, water, comfortable clothes and cell phone batteries.
- 24 April – The National Sit-in occurs, with Venezuelans peacefully filling the country's streets grinding them to a halt. In Caracas, demonstrators sat playing games in streets, using umbrellas to shade themselves from the sun. In other locations, professors gave lectures in the streets about politics while other created fires, cooking soups in the streets. By the evening, smaller skirmishes separate from the sit-ins caused most of the days violence, leaving more than two Venezuelans dead and 3 wounded.
- 26 April –The Bolivarian government begins efforts to withdraw from the Organization of American States, a 2-year process, after multiple member states called for a special session to discuss Venezuela's crisis. The Caracas Metro was closed completely after being open for two hours, along with the suspension of the Metrobus and Bus Caracas services. Juan Pablo Pernalete, a 20-year-old accounting student of the Universidad Metropolitana, was killed by the impact of a tear gas canister in his chest during protests in Altamira. Ramón Muchacho, mayor of Chacao, reported he arrived at Salud Chacao without vital signs. Following the death of the student. the son of Ombudsman Tarek Saab, Yibram Saab, uploaded a video on YouTube stating that he had protested that night and that "That could've been me!", condemning what he called and plead to his father saying "Dad, in this moment you have the power to end the injustice that has sunk this country. I ask you as your son and in the name of Venezuela, to whom you serve, that you reflect on the situation and do what you have to do".
- 27 April – Students marched for two hours from the Universidad Metropolitana to the place in Altamira Square where Juan Pablo Pernalete was killed, after holding a mass in the university in his honor.

== May ==
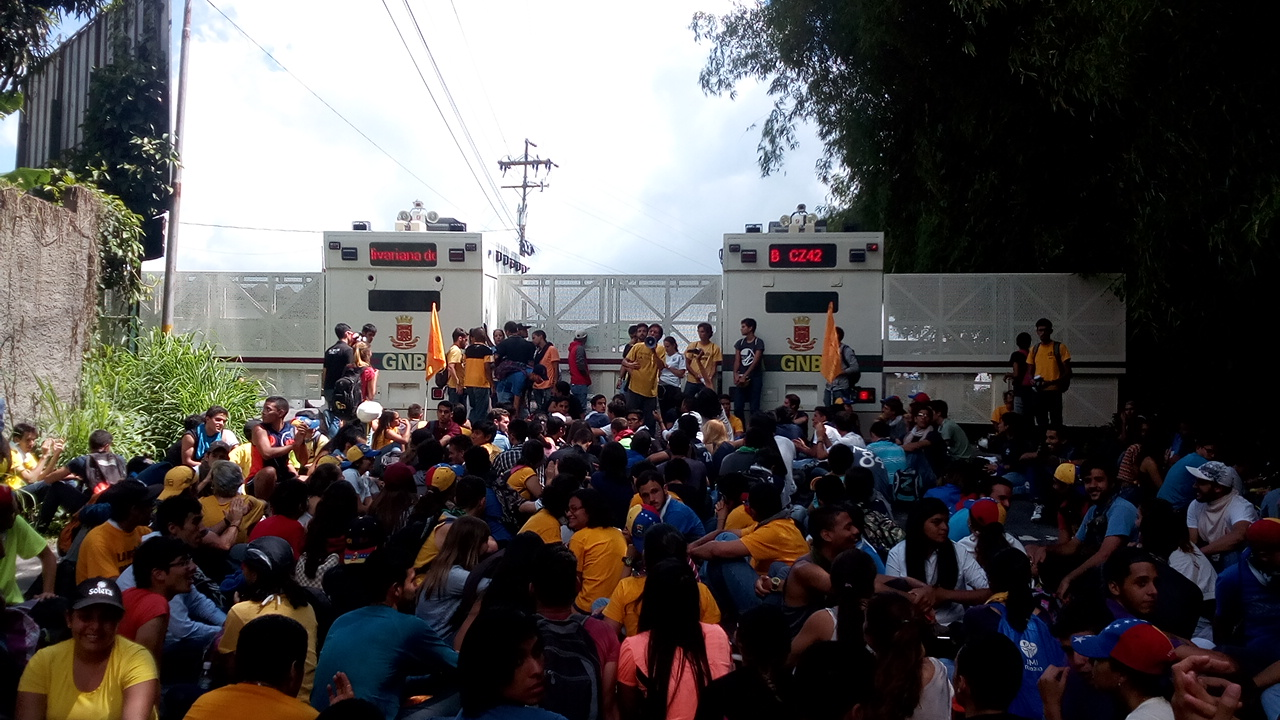
Simón Bolívar University students protest blocked by National Guard trucks on 4 May.

A statue of Hugo Chávez destroyed in Zulia on 5 May.

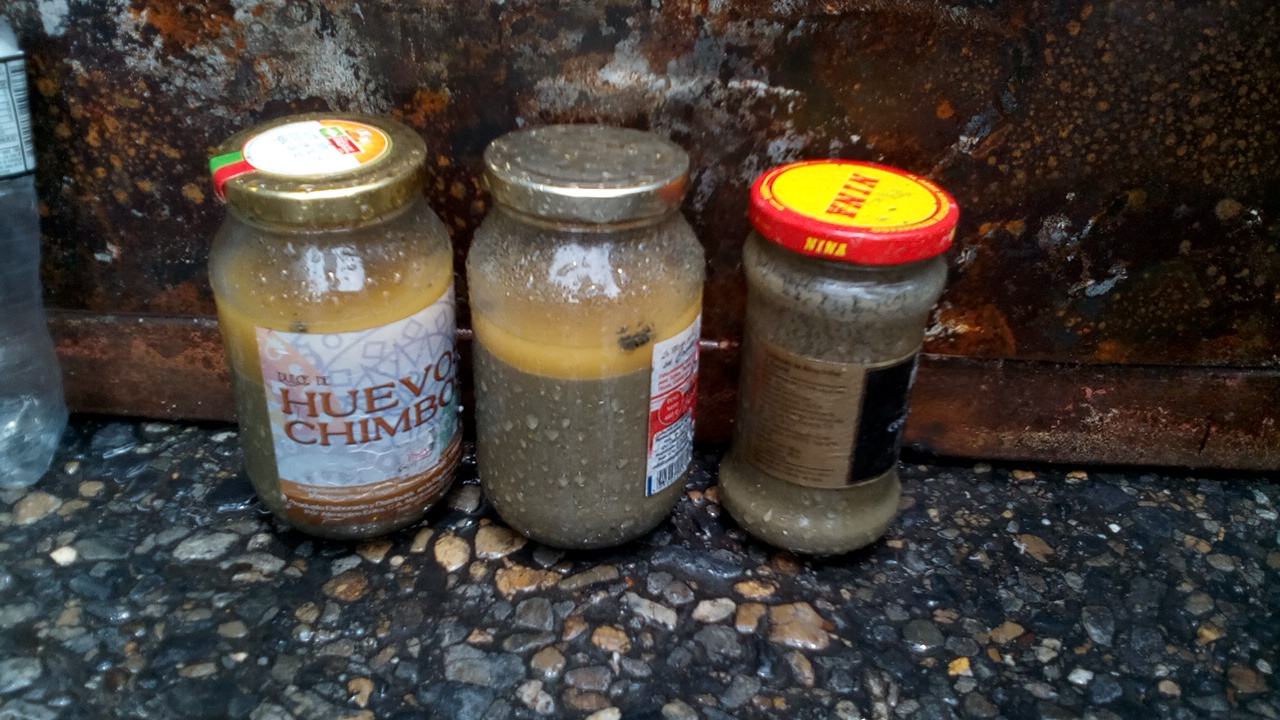
Puputovs in opposition sit in.

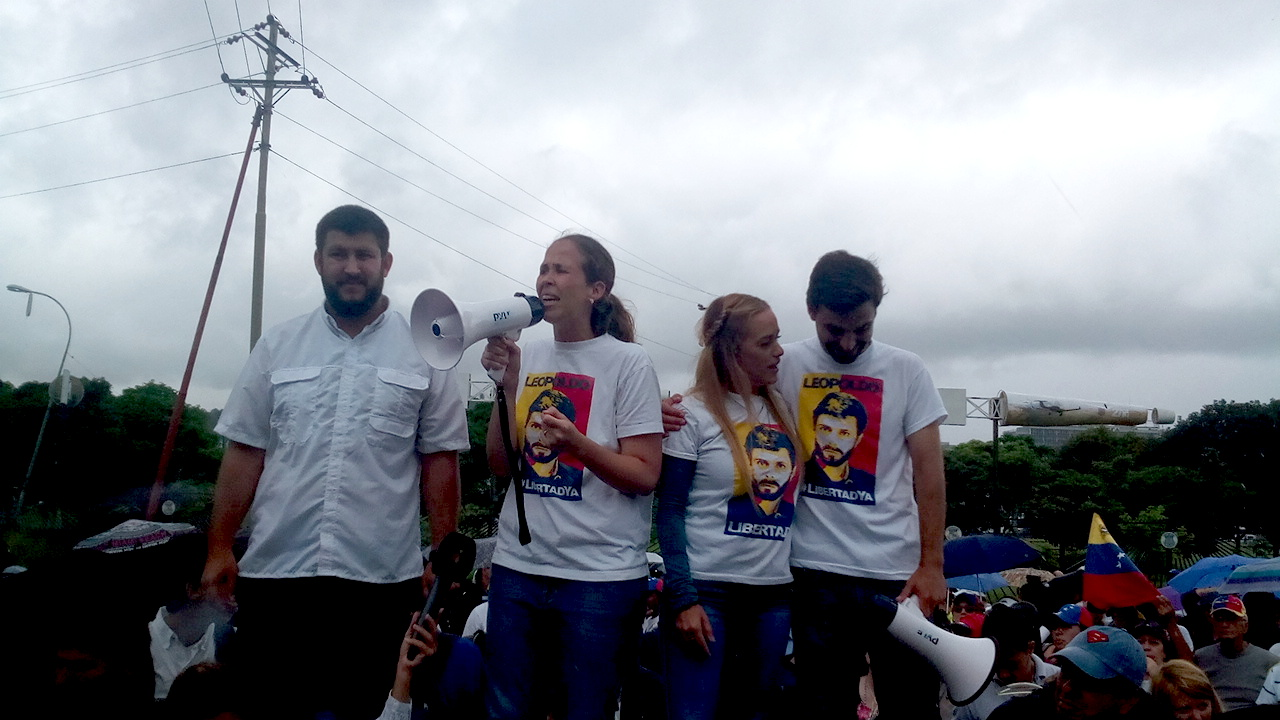
From left to right: David Smolansky, Manuela Bolívar, Lilian Tintori and Juan Andrés Mejía during national sit in on 15 May.

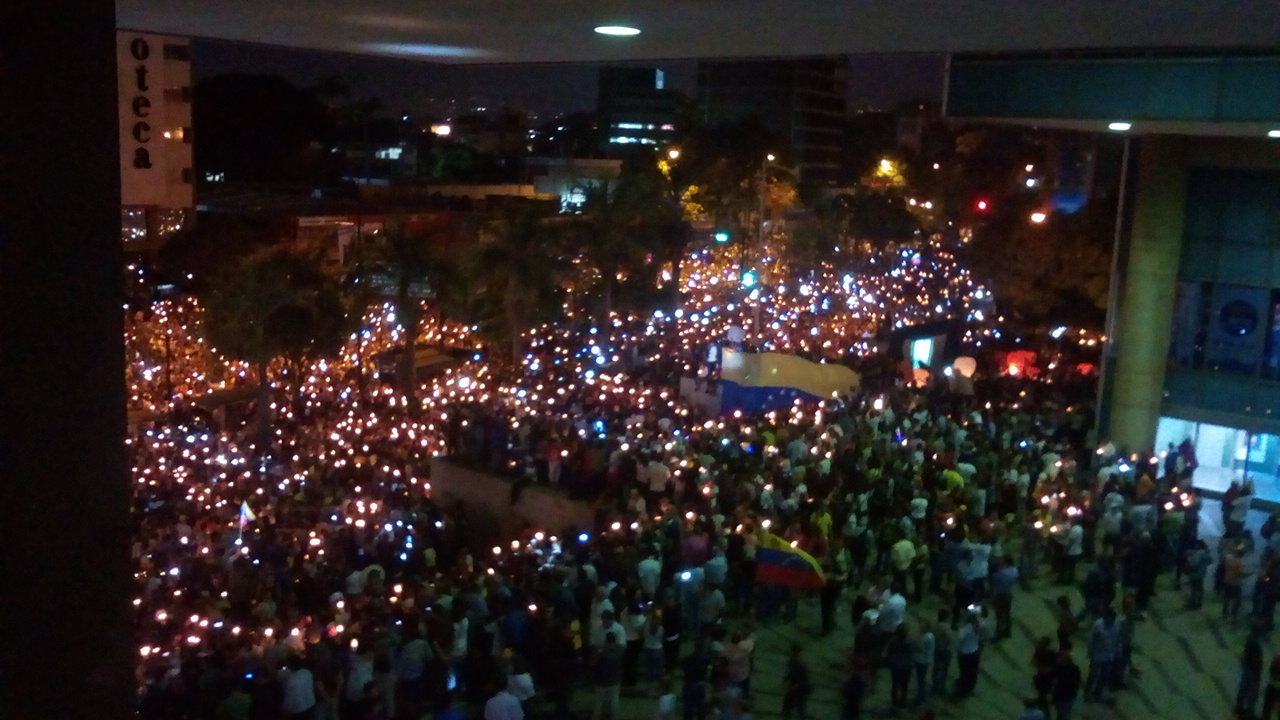
Nocturnal march in Caracas on 17 May 2017.

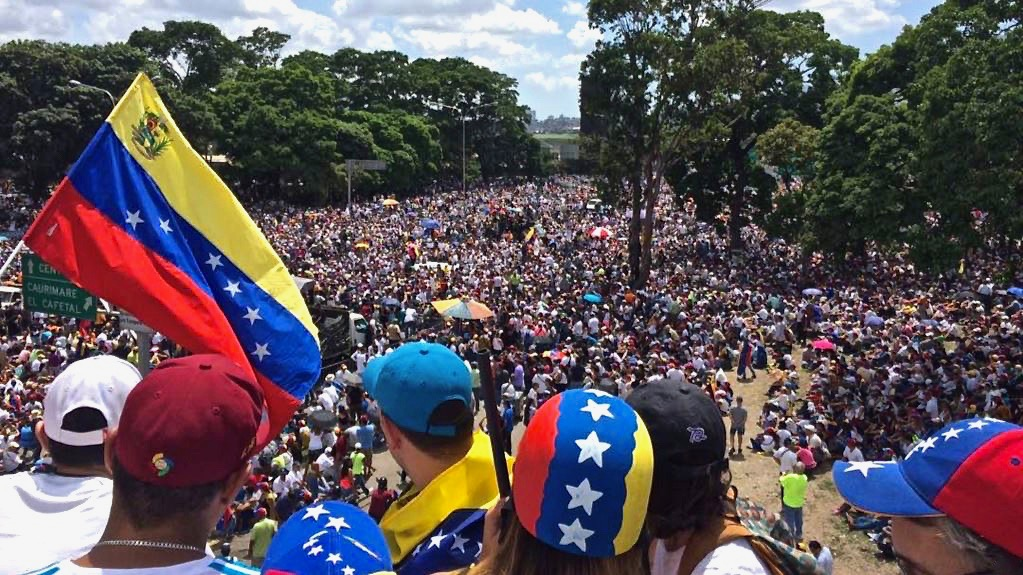
Millions of Venezuelans marching on 20 May during the We Are Millions march.

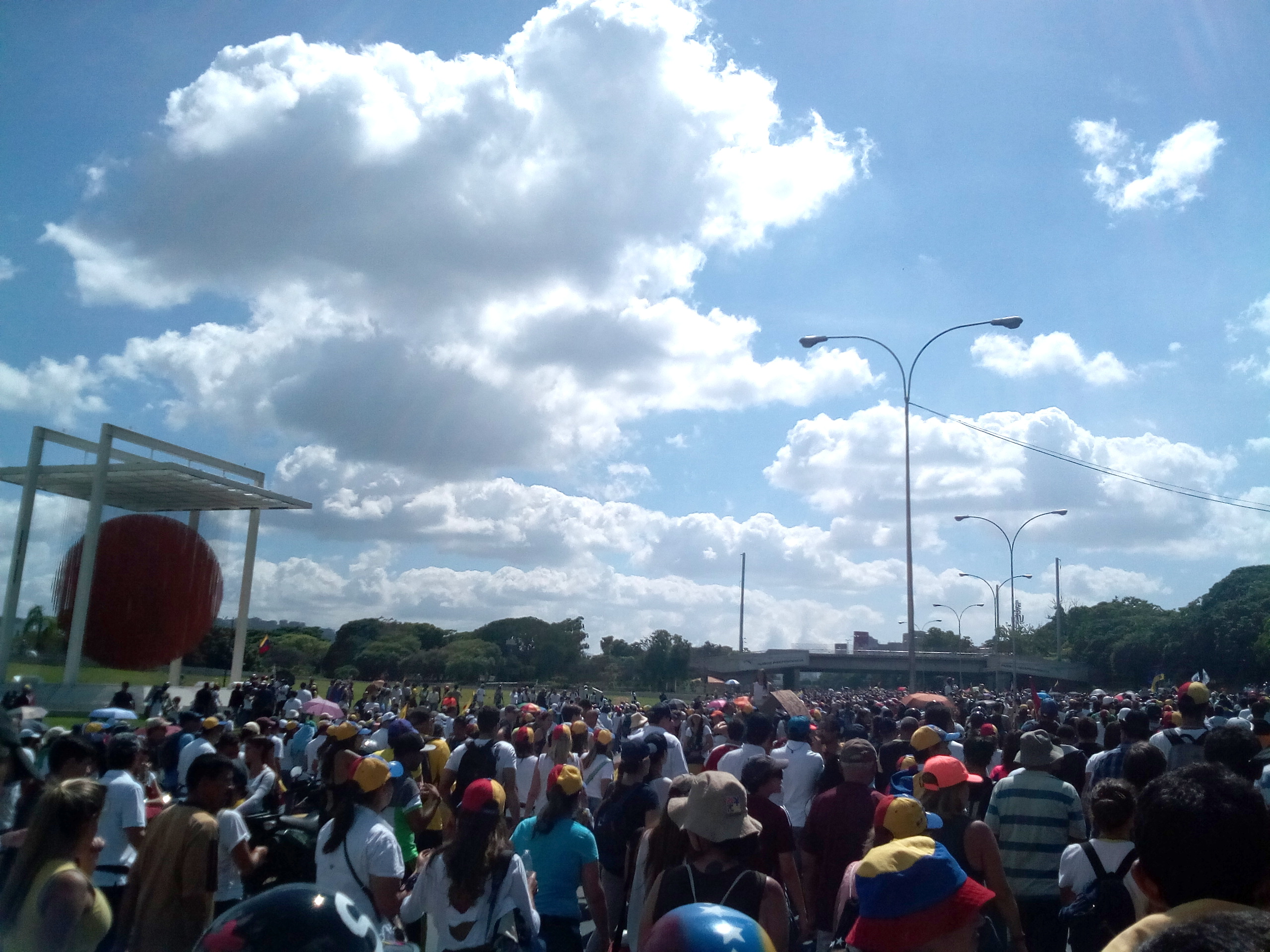
Venezuelans marching on 20 May during the We Are Millions march in the Francisco Fajardo Freeway.

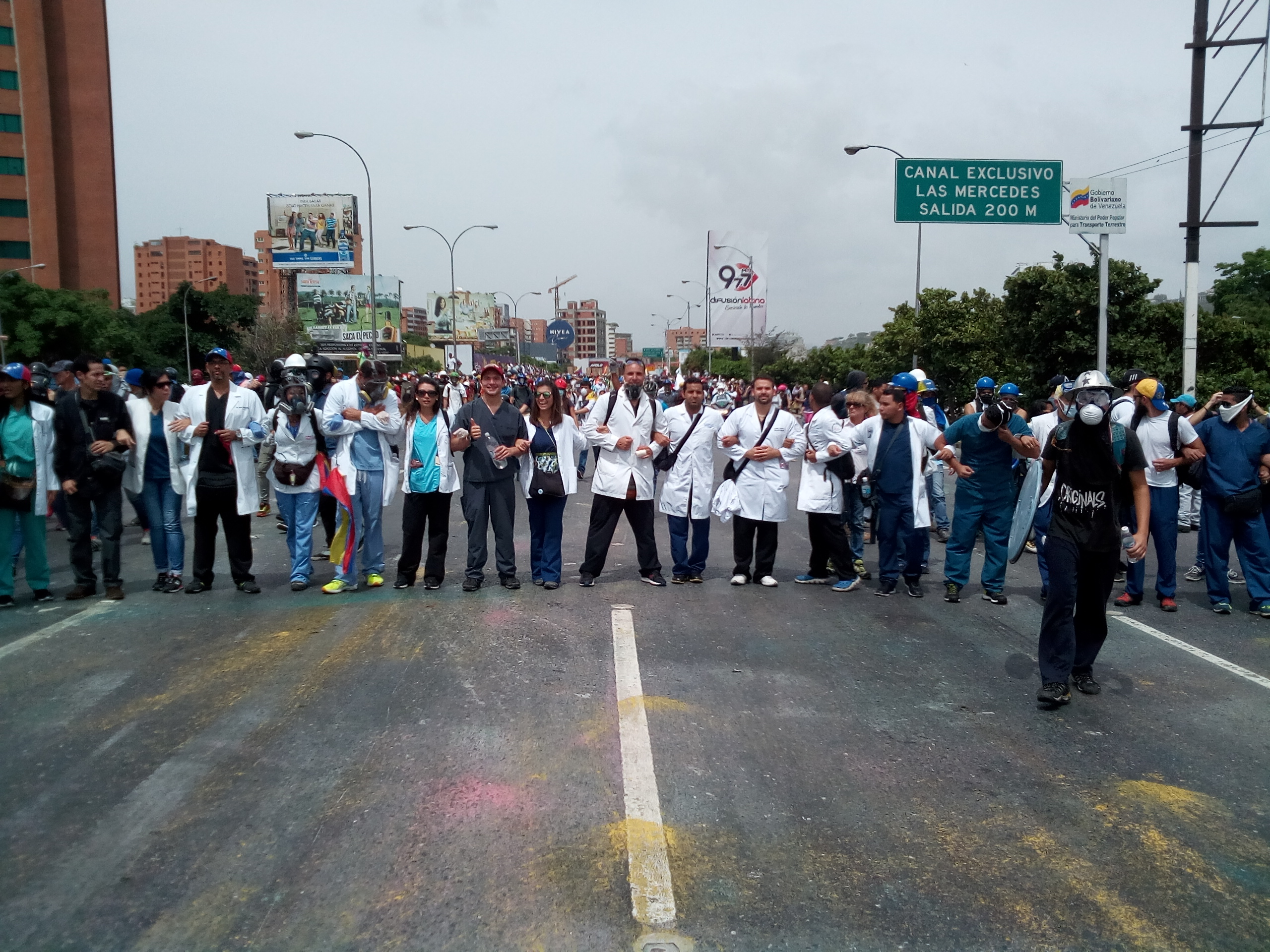
Medics hold arms during the Health March on 24 May.

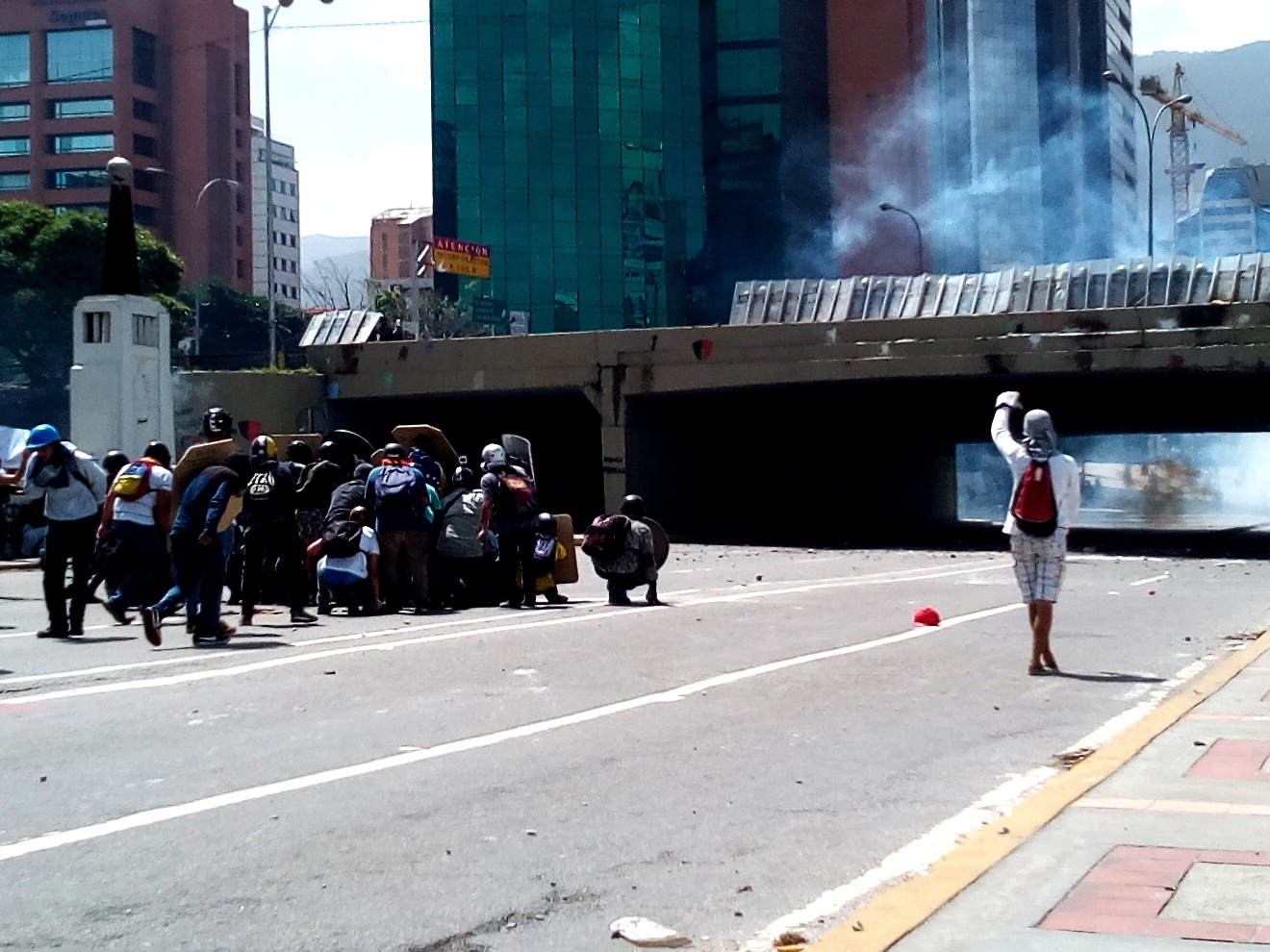
Protesters and National Guard clash during the March of the Liberators on 26 May.

- 1 May – Hundreds of thousands protested, attempting to march to various government buildings to have their demands met. Police responded to the peaceful marches violently firing tear gas, with one National Assembly member, Jose Olivares, being struck in the head with a tear gas canister which led to heavy bleeding. President Maduro announces plans to replace the National Assembly with a communal national constitutional assembly and calls for the drafting of a new constitution, the 3rd in modern times.
- 3 May - Hundreds of thousands of people marched nationwide; two protesters were killed, and a police officer who was shot died the following day. Reports circulate that Leopoldo López, the leader of the 2014 protests who was sentenced the 13 years in prison in 2015, was "transferred to a military hospital with health complications". During a protest in Altamira, a National Guard truck ran over a group of protesters, resulting in at least three wounded.
- 4 May - Protesters, primarily students, marched in and around Caracas, with tear gas being used near the Central University of Venezuela. The president of the federation of student centers of the José Antonio Anzoátegui university was killed during a student assembly in the city of El Tigre. Another student wounded during the incident died days later. Many supporters of Leopoldo López, gathered outside of Ramo Verde Prison and protested throughout the region following reports that his health was seriously impaired and the Bolivarian government's denial of visitors to López, though they released a "proof of life" video, which some described as fabricated. Human Rights Watch further demanded President Maduro to authorize a visit to López since he had been denied visits from his family and his lawyer since early-April. Lilian Tintori, López's wife, later called for a march of women on Saturday, 6 May, stating to the Minister of Defense, "Vladimir Padrino Lopez, are you going to shoot the women this Saturday?"
- 5 May - Opposition officials drape a large banner down the side of the National Assembly's administrative building high above central Caracas reading "Dictator Maduro". Citizens of La Villa del Rosario burn and tear down a statue of late President Hugo Chávez, an image compared to the destruction of Saddam Hussein's statue in Iraq as well as other instances of statue toppling during times of popular unrest.
- 6 May - Tens of thousands of Venezuelan women march throughout Venezuela against the government of President Maduro. In Caracas, nuns, women dressed in white and topless women marched on the Francisco Fajardo Freeway together until they were barricaded by the National Guard near central Caracas. In Táchira, women marched carrying rosaries and prayed for protest victims.
- 8 May - President Maduro announces a plan of "a military constituency to deepen the Bolivarian military revolution within the very heart of the National Bolivarian Armed Forces", calling for the military to help draft a new constitution with the goal to "strengthen the union" between the military and civilians. In Maracaibo, a foundation housing children and elderly individuals was caught between a clash of authorities and protesters, resulting in the evacuation of hundreds due to the heavy use of tear gas. Demonstrators begin using "Puputovs", a play on words of Molotov cocktail, with glass devices filled with excrement and thrown at authorities after PSUV official Jacqueline Faría mocked protesters who had to crawl through sewage in the Guaire River. The hashtag #puputov began to trend on Twitter in Venezuela while there were also reports of authorities beginning to vomit after being drenched in excrement by protesters.
- 9 May - In Caracas and Táchira, the Democratic Unity Roundtable called for open cabildos to discuss the proposed assembly constituency. 25-year-old Oriana Wadskier, a student of the University of Carabobo, was run over by an IVSS truck (Instituto Venezolano de los Seguros Sociales) during a protest of agricultural workers in Calabozo, Guárico State. She was taken to a hospital by helicopter, where she was later stabilized, while the National Guard arrested the truck driver. On social media, Venezuelans, apparently unrelated to political parties, call for a "Marcha de la Mierda", or a "March of the Shit", asking protesters to bring "puputov cocktails" to marches to retaliate against the use of tear gas by authorities, instructing Venezuelans how to make them and safe methods of using containers other than glass so they would not hurt authorities."They have gas; we have excrement," reads an image floating around social media to advertise Wednesday's "shit march".
- 10 May - Demonstrators attempt to march to the Supreme Tribunal of Justice headquarters. Protests turn violent as authorities repress demonstrators. In Altamira, one student is shot in the head with a tear gas canister and knocked unconscious. In total, 170 Venezuelans were injured while one, 27-year-old Miguel Castillo Bracho, a journalist who had graduated the previous week, was killed after being shot in the chest with a tear gas canister by a National Guardsman after already being detained.
- 11 May - A march commemorating Miguel Castillo Bracho, who died the previous day, occurs with participants carrying flowers while singing hymns and saying prayers. Students in several universities throughout Venezuela also held events in memory of the fallen protester.
- 12 May - The "March of Grandparents", which was a demonstration of grandparents calling for a better future for their grandchildren, was repressed with tear gas as they attempted to make their way to the ombudsman's headquarters.
- 13 May - Opposition protesters block the Central Regional Highway, with demonstrators in Aragua shutting down "the most important roadway in the country", while opposition leaders calling it a "victory" and that they "made history".
- 14 May - Mothers demonstrated wearing black, protesting for a better future for their children and pleaded for Venezuelan authorities to stop killing young protesters. Opposition parties announce locations for nationwide sit-in protests that were planned for 15 May.
- 15 May - The national sit-in occurs with thousands of Venezuelans blocking designated areas of trafficking for up to 12 hours. In Táchira, two were shot dead; 17-year-old Luis Alviarez and 32-year-old Diego Hernández.
- 17 May - Venezuelans throughout the country gather in the evening at designated areas to mourn those who had been killed during the protests. Demonstrators in Caracas gathered at Parque Cristal while in Altamira, they gathered at Plaza Francia, with both meetings involving candlelight vigils during the night. In other states such as Lara and Carabobo, citizens participated in peaceful marches, reciting prayers in candlelight.
- 18 May - 24-year-old Paul René Moreno, a student of medicine at University of Zulia and a member of the Green Cross, was killed after being struck by an armored Toyota Hilux in Maracaibo. During evening protests, 16-year-old Daniel Rodríguez was killed after being shot in the head by colectivo members while protesting in Córdoba, Táchira.
- 19 May - Protesters in Mérida close off multiple roads with barricades. In the evening hours, strong clashes occur in Altos Mirandinos, resulting in one young man dead, 60 injured, 15 arrested and over 70 businesses in the area looted.
- 20 May - On the 50th day of consecutive protests, millions of Venezuelans protested in Caracas during the "We Are Millions" march, demanding an end to violent repression and immediate elections. Capriles announced that the march would later head towards the Ministry of Internal Affairs; the march was blocked shortly afterwards. Reporters captured images of authorities using fireworks against protesters as well as obtaining shotgun shells used by state forces that were loaded with marbles. In Caracas alone, the march resulted in more than 90 individuals wounded. In the Francisco de Miranda avenue, a gray Corsa drove towards an opposition march, being the third incident where a vehicle runs over demonstrators. The driver ran over at least five persons, one of which was taken to Salud Chacao. During evening protests, Alejandro Aguilar was killed in Valera, Trujillo by colectivo members despite nearby police presence.
- 22 May - The March of Health occurs in Caracas with demonstrators attempting to travel to the Ministry of Health headquarters to protest against the shortages of medicine and other essential medical supplies, though the march was quickly repressed by authorities. The health march was the only official opposition demonstration of the day. A government endorsed medic march headed from Caracas Square to the Miraflores Palace in support of the assembly constituency. In Barinas, Barinas near Hugo Chávez's hometown, hundreds are injured in rioting against President Maduro's constitutional proposals as at least 50 stores are looted and multiple government buildings are firebombed, including the area's PSUV headquarters and the La Concordia police station where uniforms and firearms were stolen. Following the death of two students who are killed by the National Guard in Barinas, Hugo Chávez's birthplace home is burned down by protesters. Protesters in the area also destroyed five statues of Chávez in addition to destroying his childhood home. Up to six individuals were killed during the rioting in Barinas.
- 23 May - The CNE clears the way for the Constitutional Assembly elections to occur in late-July.
- 24 May - Tens of thousands of Venezuelans march against the CNE's approval of Maduro's Constitutional Assembly, with a march to the CNE headquarters being quickly dispersed. One man was lit on fire in the clashes, suffering severe burns. Government supporters organized a counter march to support the constituency. Luisa Ortega Díaz declared during a press conference, while explaining the details of the investigation of Juan Pablo Pernalete, that he was killed by a tear gas canister, contrary to government official's declarations claiming that he was killed with a captive bolt pistol. Jorge Rodríguez tweeted: "Luisa Ortega Díaz TRAITOR, how many dollars was your conscience worth?? Pernalete was killed by the very same right wing, don't be Inmoral miss "Attorney"" The TSJ admitted denounces against eight opposition mayors: five from Miranda and three from Mérida, including Gerardo Blyde, Ramón Muchacho and David Smolansky. The tribunal published a decision demanding them to prevent barricades in their respective municipalities and protect the right of transit of the citizens under the threat of imprisonment; in 2014 the TSJ released similar sentences that later on justified and apprehension order of mayors Daniel Ceballos and Enzo Scarano. The following day the mayors rejected the sentence, declaring that they wouldn't reject any citizen initiative of pacific protest.
- 26 May - Venezuelans protest in the "March of the Liberators", demanding the armed forces to cut their support of President Maduro and to obey the constitution, believing that the military had become a political tool of the ruling party. Their march to Fort Tiuna, a large military base in Caracas, was thwarted by authorities who dispersed the demonstrators. Government supporters marched asking for the removal from office of Ortega Díaz after her declarations.
- 27 May - The March for Freedom of Expression occurs to commemorate the tenth anniversary of the 2007 RCTV protests and closing of RCTV. Reports of Venezuelan authorities firing marbles at demonstrators emerged as the day's protests subsided.
- 29 May - Venezuelan authorities block a march to the Ombudsman's office, suppressing demonstrators with tear gas and pressurized-water trucks. Opposition leader Henrique Capriles and his team were attacked by the National Guard near Las Mercedes with three individuals being injured with shotgun pellets – one suffered an open would from the gunfire – while Capriles was beaten by authorities and had his cell phone and equipment stolen. At a conference following the days protests, it was revealed that nearly 300 were injured, with Capriles stating that a national strike had been considered.
- 30 May - A march planned to have embassies and consulates as destinations, because of the OAS chancellors meeting, was cancelled after Henrique Capriles declared that there were plans to attack the embassies and spoil the protest. The march was changed in order to accompany students to the Ministry of Internal Affairs.
- 31 May - A march to the headquarters of the Venezuelan Chancellery in Caracas was quickly repressed by authorities, resulting in nearly 100 injured.

== June ==
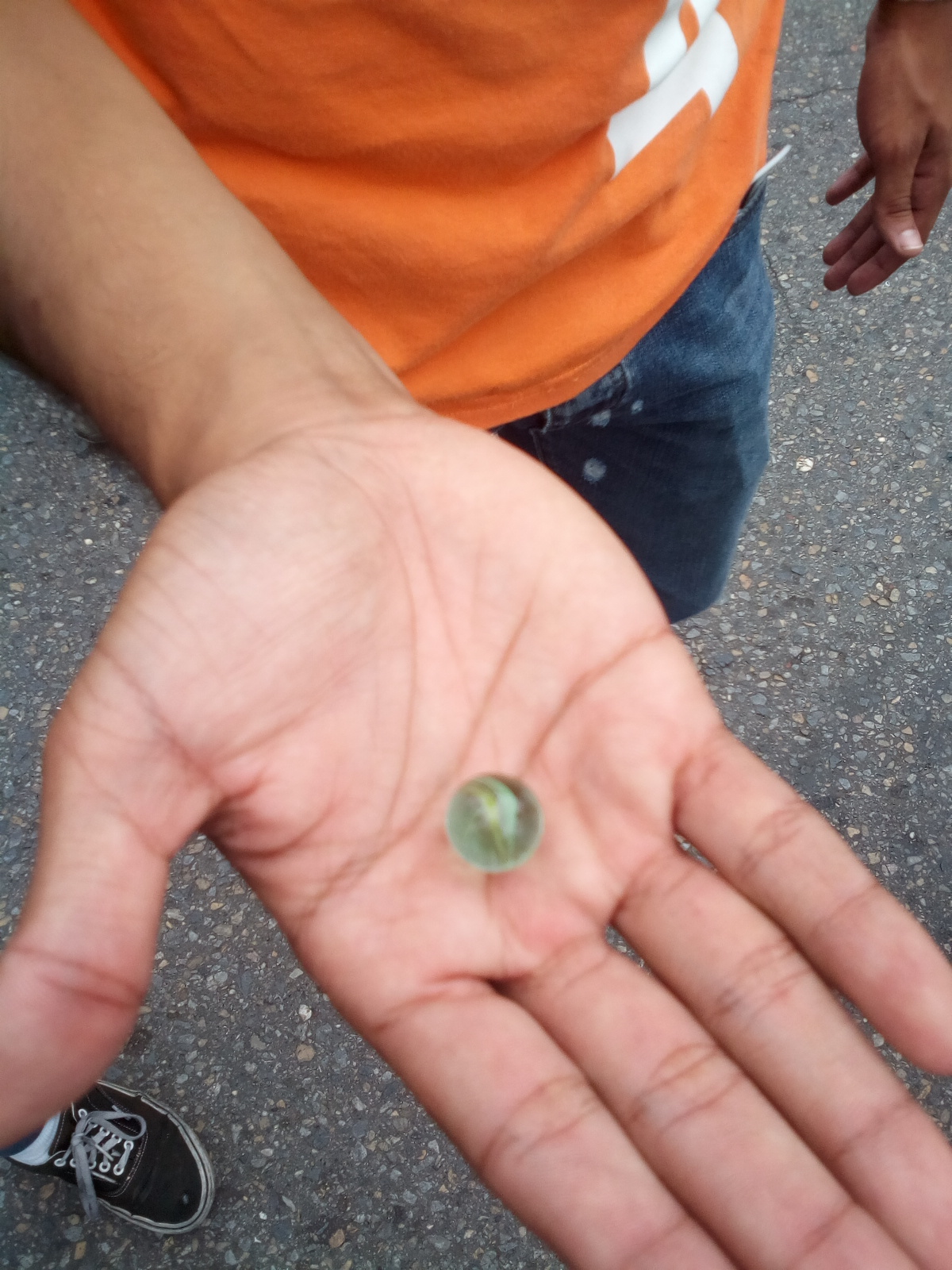
Marble shot by the National Guard on 7 June.

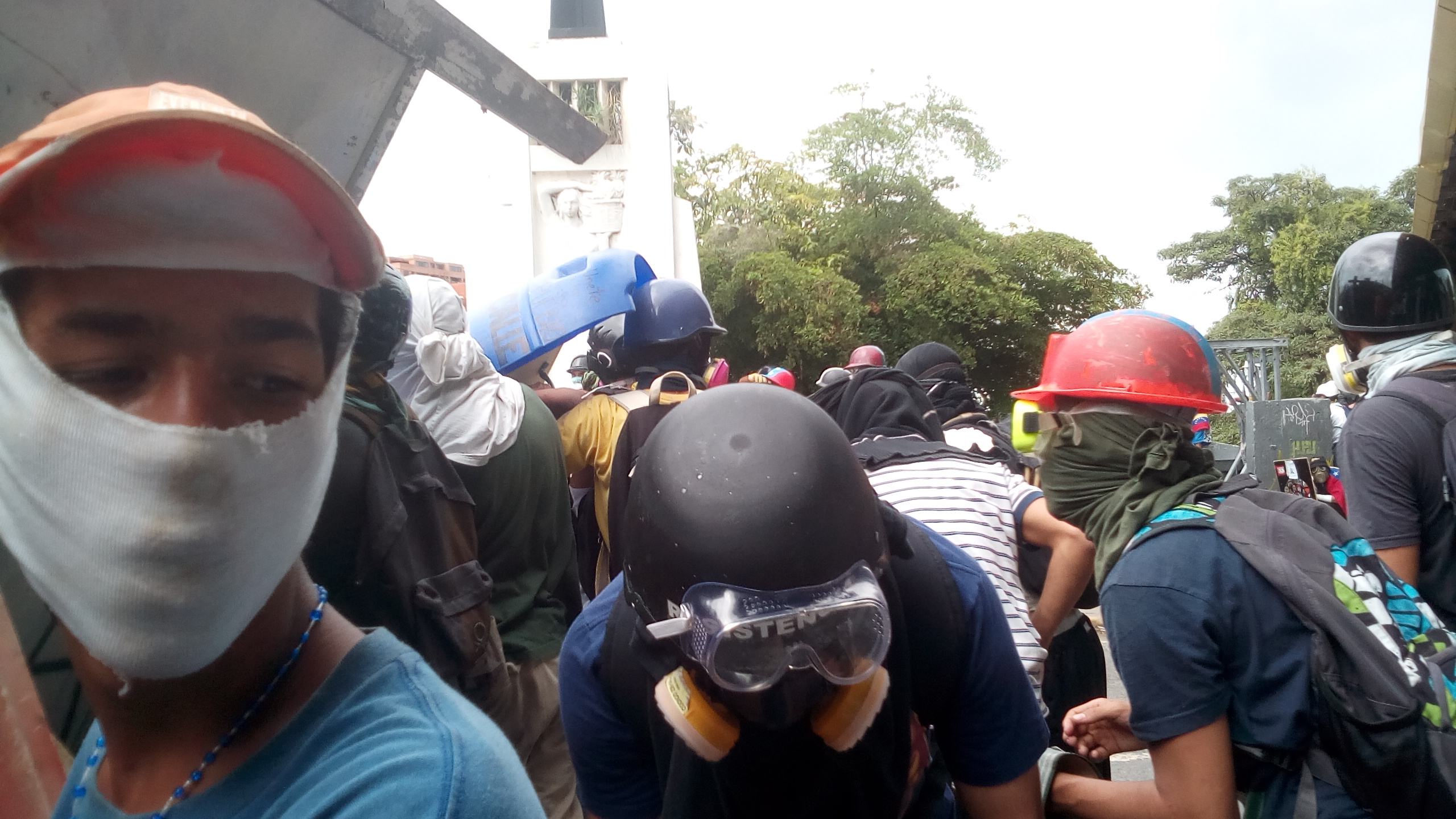
Protesters protecting themselves from rubber bullets on 7 June.

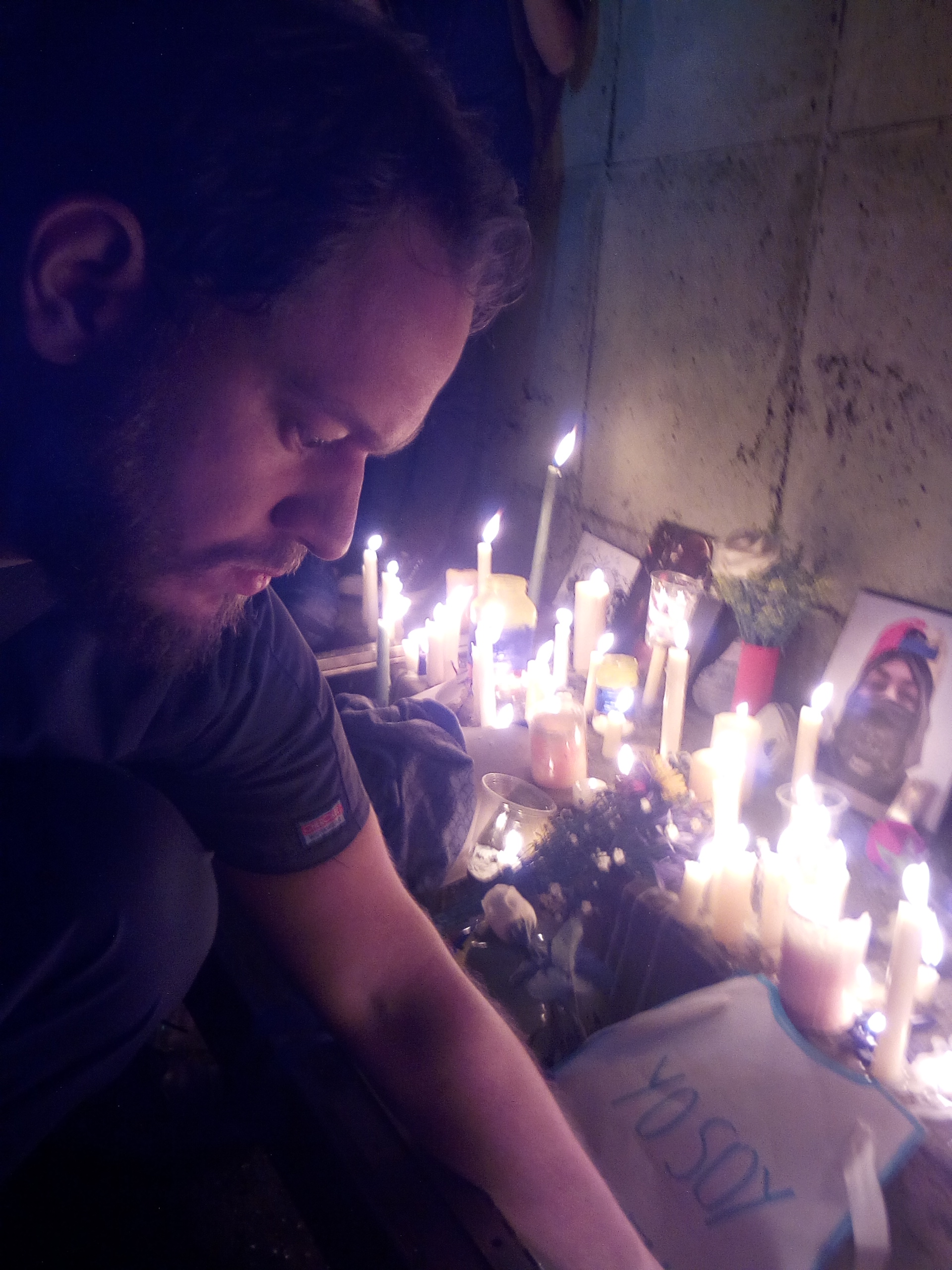
Man kneeling in an altar dedicated to Neomar Lander on 8 June.

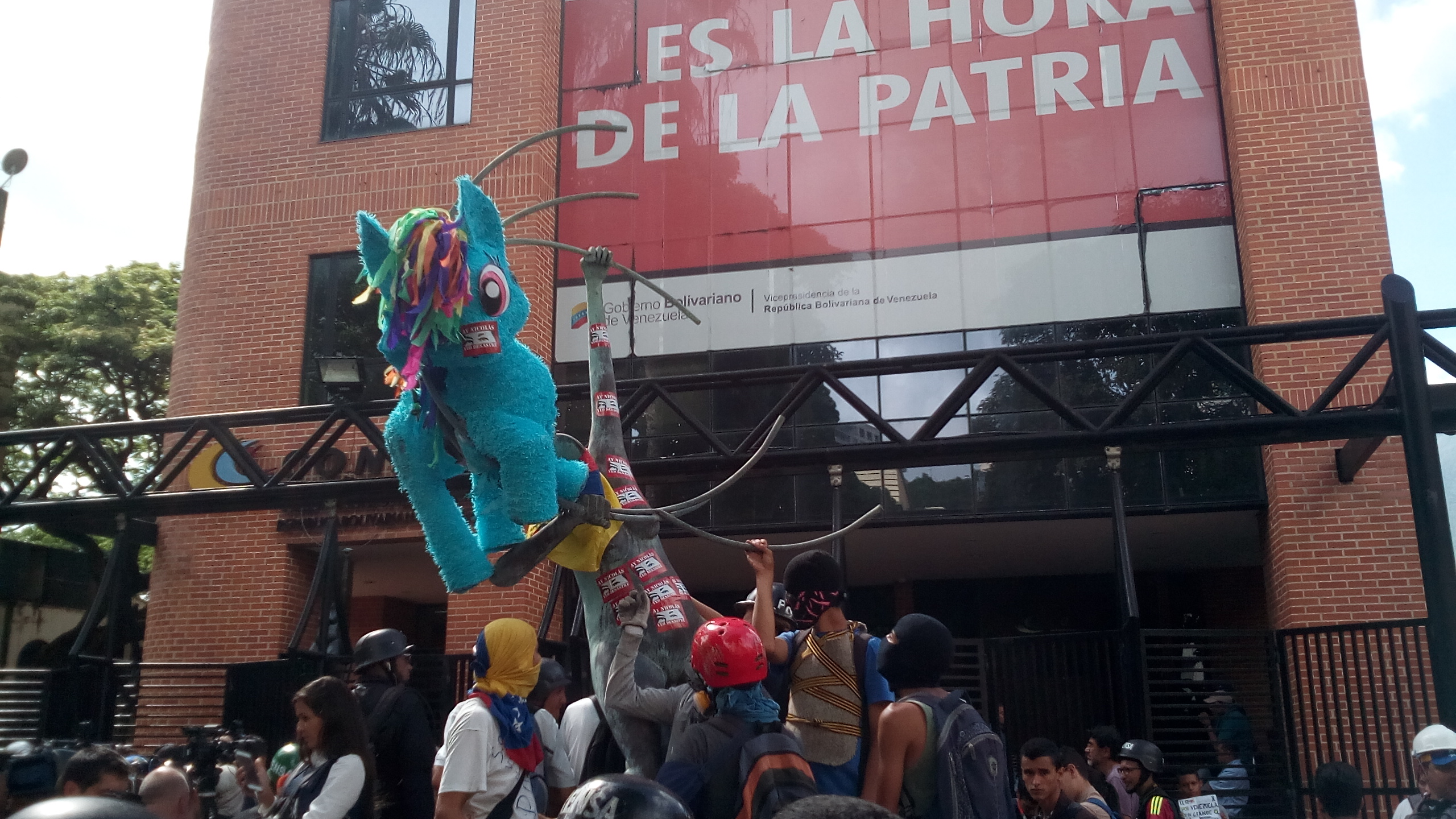
Protesters outside the entrance of CONATEL on 9 June.

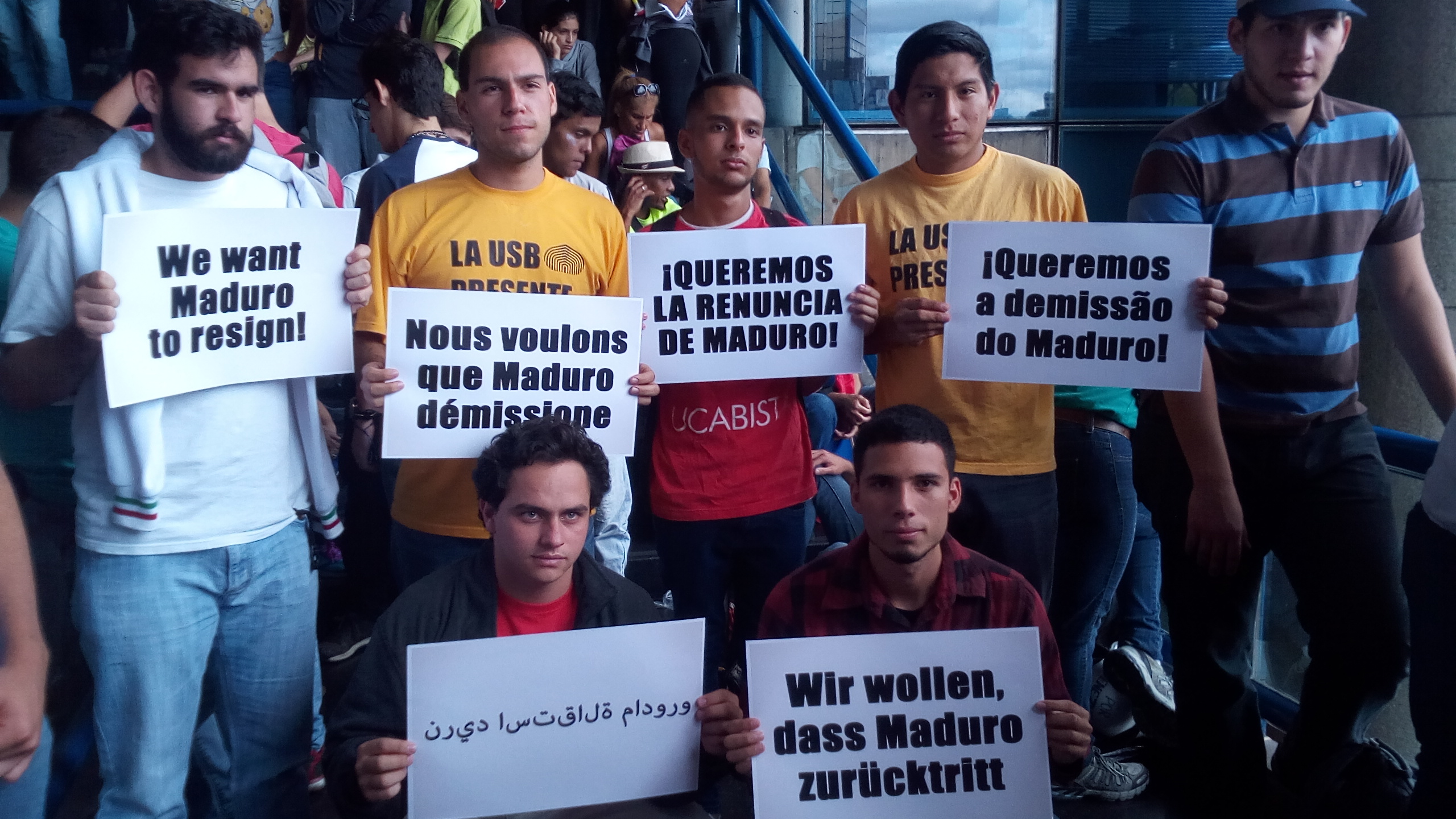
Students holding signs asking for Maduro's resignation in different languages on 19 June.

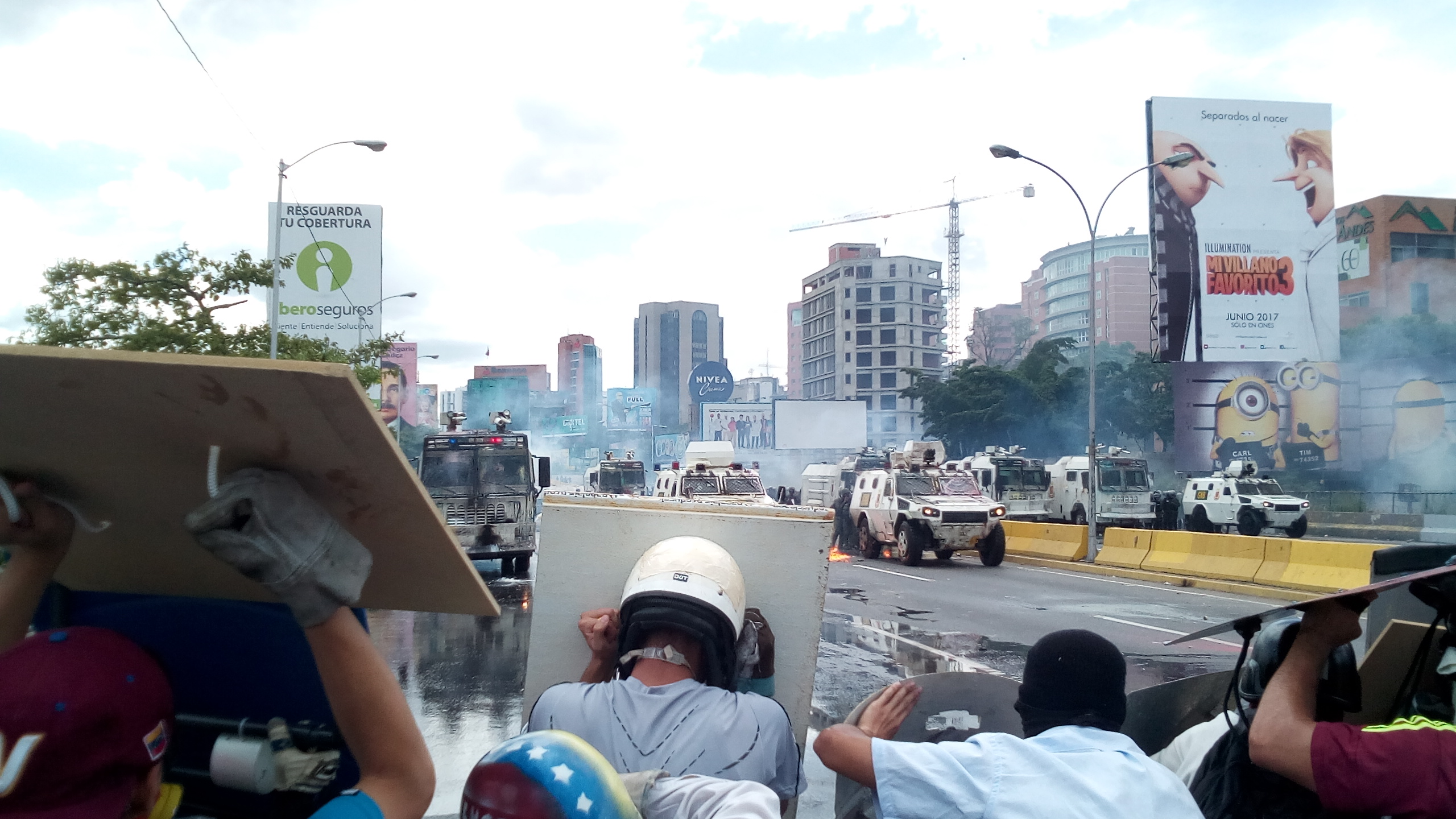
Escuderos facing National Guard's tanks in the Francisco Fajardo freeway on June 19, hours before Fabián Urbina was shot dead.

David Vallenilla being shot dead by Venezuelan authorities on 22 June.

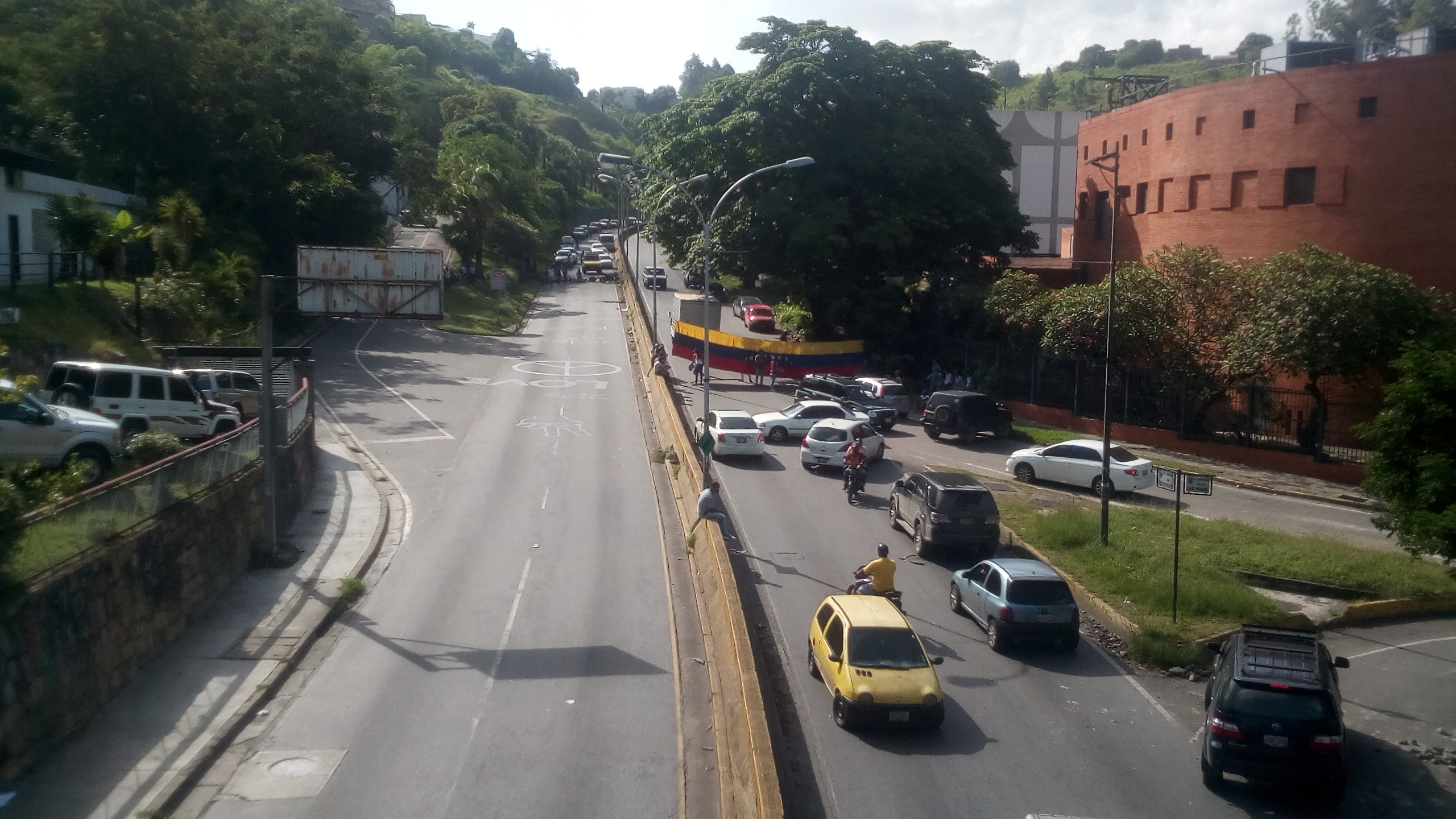
Trancazo (stoppage in English) in eastern Caracas on 23 June.

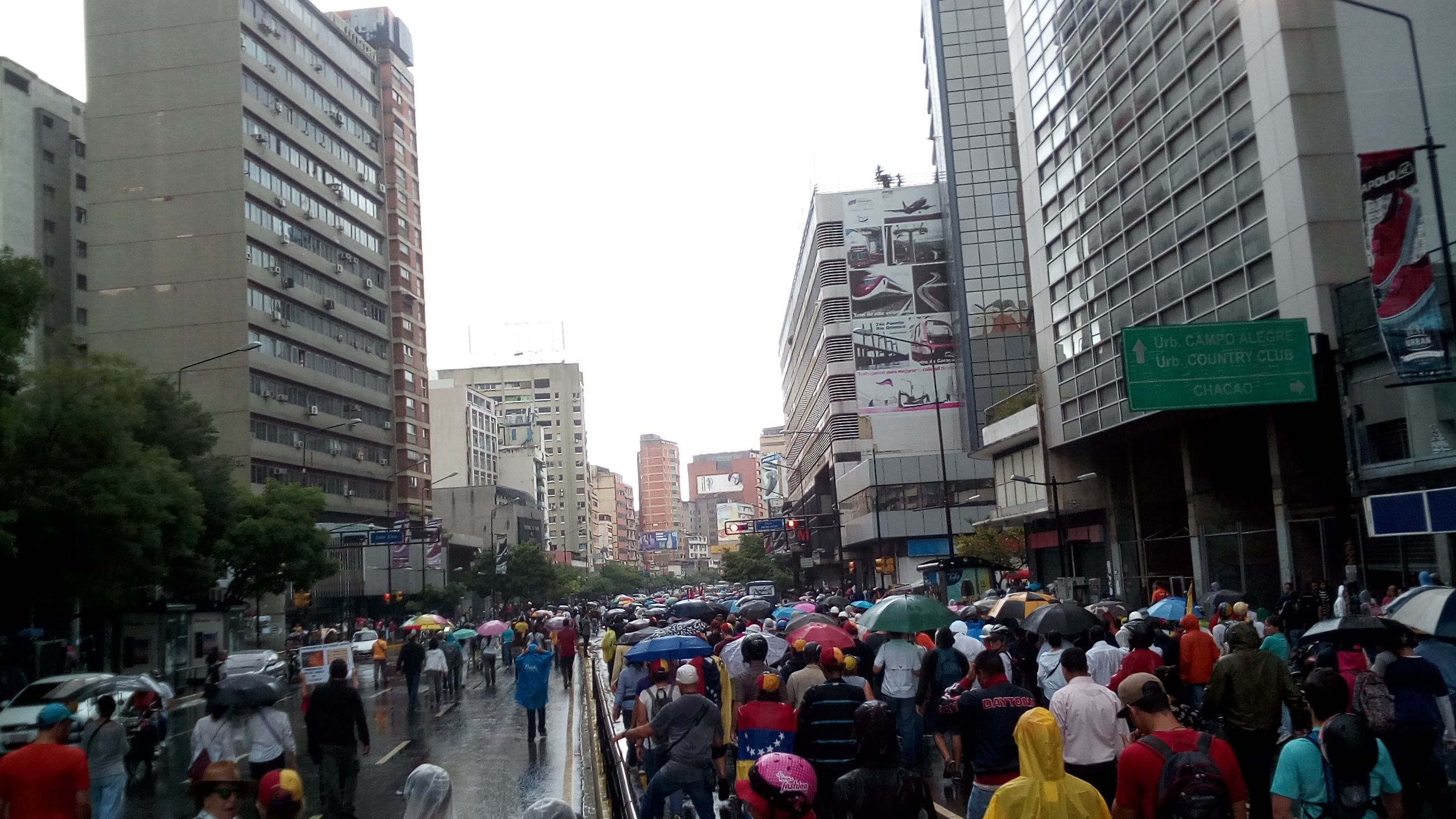
March under rain to the Electoral Council in Caracas on 29 June, minutes before USB students were arrested.

- 2 June - Protesters demonstrate outside of the state television studios of Venezolana de Televisión in Los Ruices, demanding the channel to not censor the crisis in Venezuela. 20-year-old Luis Miguel Gutierrez was killed after being shot in Tovar, Mérida.
- 3 June - A March of Empty Pots occurs, protesting against shortages and hunger in the country, and is quickly repressed by authorities, resulting in the injuries of several protesters in the Montalbán area of western Caracas.
- 5 June - A national sit-in occurs once more, though the attempt in Caracas was quickly thwarted by authorities. More than 100 were injured in Caracas following the repression as authorities used live ammunition on protesters. Members of CONAS, an elite anti-kidnapping task force, were seen fire live ammunition near the CCCT shopping mall where protesters gathered in eastern Caracas. The Bolivarian government calls for an evaluation of Attorney General Luisa Ortega Diaz following her criticism of the government and opposition to the constitutional assembly.
- 6 June - Students from various universities in the Caracas areas protested against the constitutional assembly near Universidad Metropolitana, with dozens injured following the response of the National Guard, who fired tier bombs, pellets and marbles at students. 19 National Guards are being tried for offenses which include homicide and 18 more have warrants out for their arrest. National Guard forces are also accused of injuring more than half the 1,000 persons reported wounded in demonstrations since April 1.
- 7 June - A second march to the CNE occurs. A 17-year-old boy, Neomar Lander, is killed after being shot directly with a tear gas canister. Demonstrations in Caracas result in at least 200 injured.
- 8 June - Venezuelan bishops of the Venezuelan Episcopal Conference (CEV) meet with Pope Francis, stating that "we have his full trust ... there's no distance between him and the conference". The bishops of the CEV "completely deny" that the pope is against the opposition and working with President Maduro, stating that the Bolivarian government desires the suffering of Venezuelans to distract them from public policies and that since the Bolivarian government will not guarantee "a humanitarian corridor, the recognition of the National Assembly, the release of the political prisoners, and resuming the electoral calendar", "there's no possibility of dialogue", concluding that the church "cannot trust the words from the government". The National Assembly approved unanimously a no-confidence motion of Néstor Reverol, the minister of internal affairs, due to the actions of security agents, human rights violations and the neglect of his functions as minister.
- 9 June - Movimiento Estudiantil students march to CONATEL to deliver a document criticizing censorship in Venezuela. The march was not impeded by authorities and they successfully delivered their statements.
- 10 June - During a march headed towards the Victoria Avenue, the National Police fired tear gas at the Red Cross seat in Caracas in La Candelaria. The building hoisted the Red Cross flag after the attack.
- 12 June - The MUD summons the "Metro a Metro" march, with every subway station in Caracas being a meeting point to march to the Supreme Tribunal. Entries to the Tribunal were blocked by National Guardsmen.
- 13 June - SEBIN officers shot a dog in the eye during a raid in a residential community in western Caracas. Neighbors also reported electricity and water cuts, damage to their vehicles and that CONAS, National Guard and SEBIN officers entered firing tear gas towards the buildings.
- 14 June -Protests occur in Altamira, with the National Guard firing tear gas at national and international media correspondents so they would not cover their response to protests.
- 15 June - Thousands marched for peace during the Divina Pastora procession in Barquisimeto, Lara. Cacerolazos were held in Caracas, with banging pots being heard throughout the capital city.
- 16 June - Bolivarian official Pedro Carreño calls on the Supreme Court to prosecute Attorney General Luisa Ortega Díaz, with magistrates ruling that Ortega was prohibited from leaving Venezuela. In Barquisimeto, Lara, a young man was killed after being shot at a demonstration.
- 17 June - At least 180 Twitter accounts of the Venezuelan government were suspended. The United in Faith Marches occur throughout the country.
- 18 June - Students who were marching nearly 380 kilometres (240 mi) from Barquisimeto to Caracas arrived in Los Teques, Miranda near Caracas and had their goods stolen by National Guardsmen in the area.
- 19 June - 17-year-old Fabián Urbina, who had been already wounded during a protest on 17 March near Universidad Pedagógica Experimental Libertador in Maracay, was killed by a National Guardsman who fired live ammunition at protesters in Altamira, wounding at least four others. Néstor Reverol admitted that the National Guard was responsible for his death and assured that justice would be brought to those who were responsible for the violence.
- 20 June - The TSJ releases a statement announcing an extraordinary public hearing involving Attorney General Luisa Ortega Diaz in a "merit suit", stating that Marching since 8 June, students from Barquisimeto complete their 380 kilometres (240 mi) journey to Caracas. Following the TSJ's actions, the opposition-led National Assembly convened and enacted Article 350 of the constitution, which states that Venezuelans "will not know any regime, legislation or authority that violates democratic values, principles and guarantees or impairs human rights", further explaining that further TSJ actions would not be recognized and expressed support for Attorney General Ortega. A march in memory of Fabián Urbina who was shot and killed by a National Guardsman the previous day was rescheduled to 21 June due to the passing of Tropical Storm Bret, many still appeared to demonstrate through the storm.
- 21 June - Hundreds marched to the OAS headquarters in eastern Caracas, passing the spot where Fabian Urbina was shot dead by the National Guardsman. The opposition announced plans to march to the Attorney General's office to support Ortega on Thursday, convene citizen assemblies denouncing the constitutional assembly on Friday and resuming protests on Saturday.
- 22 June - 22-year-old David José Vallenilla died in the El Ávila clinic after being shot at point blank range by an Air Force officer in front of the Generalissimo Francisco de Miranda Air Base, being the first death in hands of an Armed Forces officer besides the National Guard.
- 23 June - A national trancazo occurs.
- 24 June - The President Maduro warned that "he and his supporters would be willing to take up arms if his government was toppled by 'undemocratic forces'". Thousands of protesters demonstrate near the La Carlota airport following the death of David José Vallenilla on 22 June, calling for less repression of protesters.
- 25 June - The opposition announces future trancazo protests.
- 26 June - Another national trancazo protest occurs. At night, mass looting occurs in Maracay, Aragua.
- 27 June - In the afternoon, a video is released showing men with assault rifles flanking Oscar Pérez, an actor and investigator of CICPC, Venezuela's investigative agency, stating that "We are nationalists, patriots and institutionalists. This fight is not with the rest of the state forces, it is against the tyranny of this government". Pérez, a CICPC investigator and helicopter pilot of nearly 20 years had recently become an actor in 2015. Hours after the video was released, Pérez is seen piloting a CICPC helicopter over the Supreme Court with a banner on the side reading "350 Liberty", a reference to Article 350 of the constitution which states that "The people of Venezuela ... shall disown any regime, legislation or authority that violates democratic values, principles and guarantees or encroaches upon human rights". While the helicopter was near the Supreme Court, gunfire was heard in the area. President Maduro stated that a military rebellion had occurred while opposition officials said that the actions were staged so Maduro could justify a crackdown on those who oppose his government and the constitutional assembly. National Guardsmen then storm the National Assembly, assaulting the largely opposition legislative body.
- 28 June - A trancazo in Caracas closes the Francisco Fajardo Freeway for hours.
- 29 June - March to the CNE occurs, where a group of protesters, including 17 students from the Universidad Simón Bolivar were arrested. The Prados del Este Highway was blocked during a trancazo. President Maduro states that the Bolivarian missions must be "re-launched". The Supreme Court barred the Attorney General Luisa Ortega Diaz from leaving the country and froze her assets, due to alleged "serious misconduct" in office. Despite having been appointed under the government of Hugo Chávez. She has been conspicuous in refusing to extend blanket support for the beleaguered regime of Nicolas Maduro.
- 30 June - Protests occur in the state of Lara, with a large truck dumping unused butcher bones to barricade streets, though hungry Venezuelans later removed all of the bones to eat. At least four are killed during protests in Lara.

== July ==
Colectivos attacking lawmakers during the 2017 Venezuelan National Assembly attack

López chanting "Sí se puede" following his release to house arrest

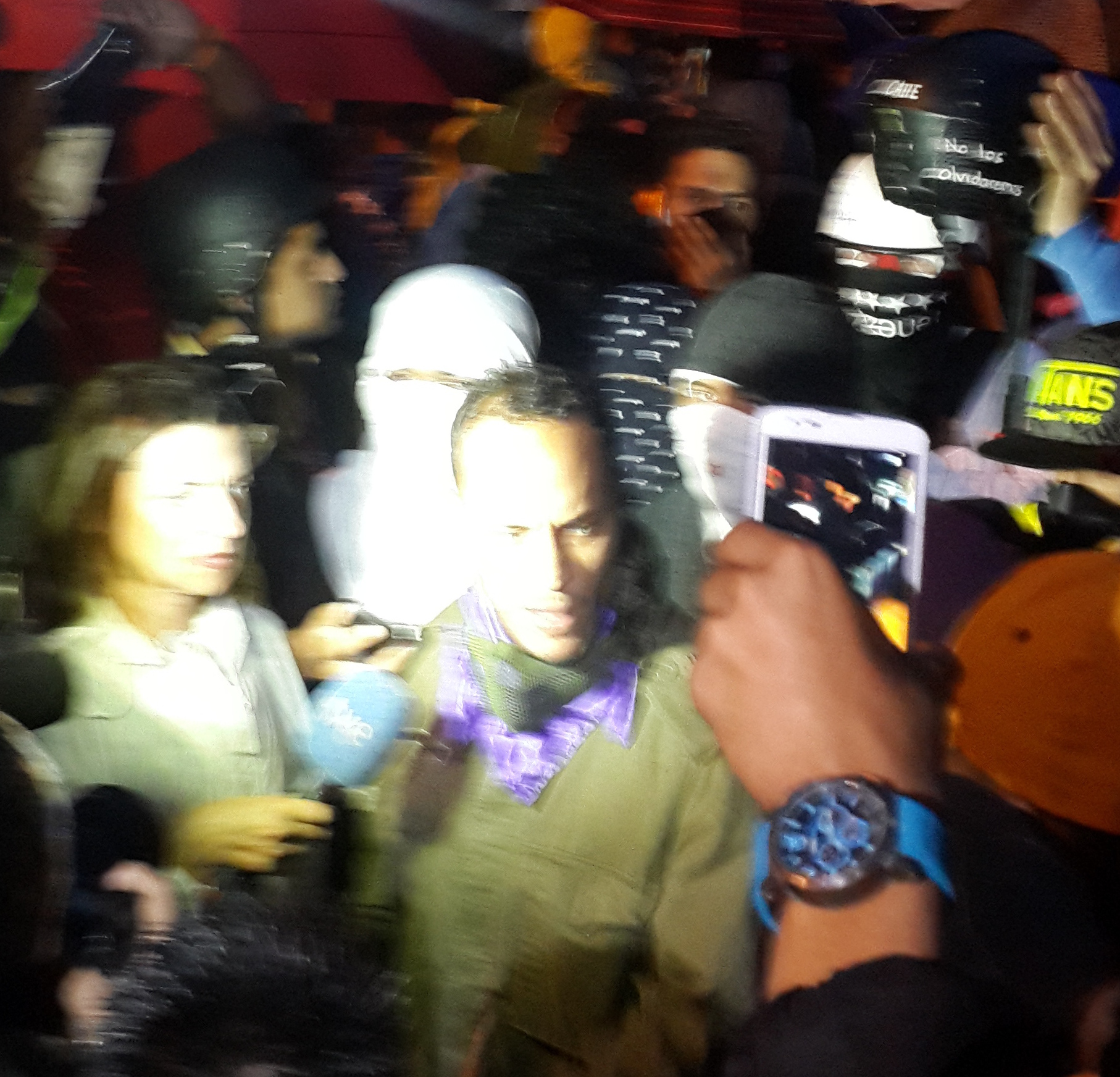
Óscar Pérez appearance in the nocturnal opposition march in Altamira on July 13

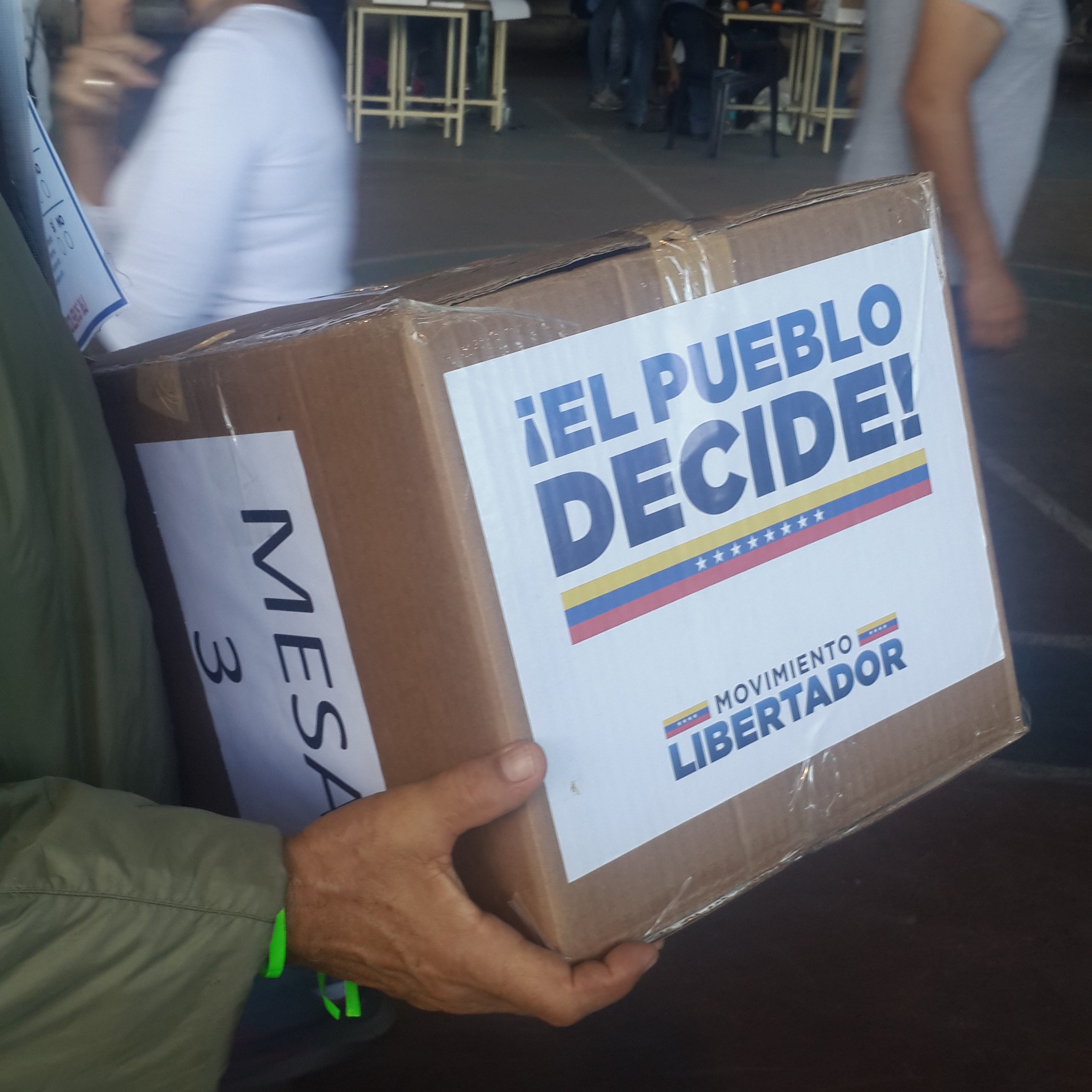
Ballot box of a voting center on 16 July

- 1 July - 25 protesters who were arrested in Caracas on 29 June, including 17 USB students, were sentenced unconditional freedom and nullity of arrest.
- 2 July - 27 Universidad Pedagógica Experimental Libertador (UPEL) students were arrested in Maracay after police officers burst into the college campus, violating the university's autonomy.
- 3 July - The opposition announces an unofficial referendum for Venezuelans to participate in to contest with the constitutional assembly on 30 July. Citizens were invited to vote on 16 July to share their opinions on the military, the proposed constitutional assembly and if they preferred the creation of a separate "national unity" government.
- 4 July - The 27 UPEL students arrested on 2 July were taken to military tribunals and sentenced to jail, while the female students were placed on house arrest.
- 5 July - The 2017 Venezuelan National Assembly attack occurs after Vice President Tareck El Aissami leads supporters and colectivos to the Palacio Federal Legislativo. National Guardsman allow mobs of government supporters into the National Assembly facility, with the attack leaving at least 12 opposition lawmakers and their staff injured. The opposition later announced plans for the 2017 Venezuelan referendum.
- 6 July - The MUD announces the questions to be asked on the ballots in their unofficial referendum, with ballots asking voters if they deny the proposed Constitutional Assembly, if they demand the armed forces to support the 1999 constitution and the National Assembly and if they demand immediate general elections with the creation of a "unity government".
- 7 July - Archbishop Diego Padron, president of the Venezuelan Episcopal Conference, states that the Constitutional Assembly is "unnecessary and inconvenient", that it would result in "a military, socialist, Marxist and communist dictatorship" and that the process was illegal since the Bolivarian government required a referendum prior to voting for members of an assembly.
- 8 July - Opposition leader Leopoldo López is released from Ramo Verde Prison and placed on house arrest.
- 9 July - Thousands take to the streets of Caracas to protest for the 100th consecutive day.
- 10 July - Another national trancazo occurs. An IED targeting members of the Venezuelan National Guard on motorcycle is detonated on the Troncal 9 in Altamira.
- 13 July - The ''Nocturnal March of the Fallen'' of the fallen occurs. Óscar Pérez makes an appearance in Altamira neighborhood of Caracas announcing support for the opposition-organized referendum that was to be held on July 16 and promoted upon the so-called "Zero Hour" of 18 July. 21-year-old protester Giovany Scovino with Asperger syndrome was severely beat up by four National Guardsmen and four National Policemen in Lechería, Anzoátegui, causing him hematomas and internal bleeding. Tarek William Saab described the actions as "cruel, degrading and inhuman treatment", visited Scovino in the hospital where he was hospitalized and announced the security officers were under arrest, although the Public Ministry denied this and announced that the arrest hasn't been formalized. The Bolivarian National Police are outfitted with new militarized, camouflage uniforms and red berets during a ceremony in Caracas, with President Maduro – while wearing the new uniform – comparing himself to Saddam Hussein and announced a raise of the salary for the Bolivarian National Police.
- 16 July - The National Consultation occurs as Venezuelans vote internationally. In Catia, colectivos fire upon voters in the neighborhood that was predominately pro-government, killing two. Participation in the "rehearsal" for President Maduro's constitutional assembly is low, with Maduro ignoring the attack on voters in Catia and instead blaming his opposition for any violence in the country. The results of the election show that over 99% of those who voted did not want the constitutional assembly proposed by President Maduro, wanted the Venezuelan armed forces to support the 1999 constitution and the National Assembly, and demanded an immediate general elections as well as the establishment of a "unity government".
- 17 July - The opposition announces their future "Zero Hour" plans to achieve a "unity" government. On 18 July, it was planned for the Commission on Judicial Applications to announce candidates for a separate Supreme Tribunal Justice (TSJ). On 19 July, the creation of a Government of National Union will occur following the "popular consultation" on 16 July, with the signing of a Unitary Commitment for Governance. On 20 July, a nationwide strike is planned to occur for 24 hours. On 21 July, the new opposition elected TSJ magistrates would be appointed.
- 18 July - Spontaneous protests occur throughout Caracas, shutting down roads in many areas. Strong clashes between the National Guard and protesters near Universidad Metropolitana occur, with a National Guard VN-4 running over protesters after they had attacked the vehicle with Molotov cocktails.
- 19 July - A national trancazo occurs, with Venezuelans barricading and blocking major highways and transit points throughout the country. The Venezuelan opposition cancels its plan to make an alternative government – known as the Government of National Unity – instead announcing plans to fix the crisis in Venezuela, while also focusing on further protests and a nationwide strike.
- 20 July - Millions of Venezuelans participate in the opposition's 24-hour general strike, with industry and commerce ceasing throughout the nation. President Maduro warns private business owners that they would face consequences for participating in the strike, though many public offices were also short of staff due to the strike. Protesters barricaded streets to maintain the slowdown, with opposition leader Henrique Capriles calling on demonstrators to clear paths for emergency vehicles when necessary.
- 22 July - Protesters march towards the Supreme Court alleging them of bias towards President Maduro.
- 27 July - The President Nicolás Maduro, proposed to the opposition to set up a dialogue, national agreement and reconciliation, before the National Constitutional Assembly (NCA) is installed. Maduro said "The opposition should take this proposal, I know what I say! I propose to the opposition to abandon the insurrectional path, to return to the Constitution and install in the next few hours, before the election and installation of the NCA, a table of dialogue, national agreement and reconciliation. A national table of understanding, to talk about the great issues of the country, to talk about peace." At least five people are killed in violent clashes with police after a strike was declared by the opposition.

A bomb detonated near a Bolivarian National Police convoy on 30 July

- 30 July - The 2017 Venezuelan Constituent Assembly election occurs amid international condemnation. A bomb is detonated near a motorcycle convoy of the Bolivarian National Police that were responding to protest, injuring seven officers. At least 10 people are killed in violent incidents during the election.
- 31 July -The U.S. Treasury Secretary Steven Mnuchin branded the president Nicolas Maduro, a "dictator" on a par with Zimbabwe's Robert Mugabe, Syria's Bashar al-Assad or North Korea's Kim Jong-un, and imposed sanctions on him following Sunday's controversial vote on the constitution. The international community rounded on Maduro and condemned polling day violence in which up to 15 people were killed. President Maduro hailed the vote as a "sublime" victory for the Venezuelan people, as the Electoral National Council (CNE) said more than eight million people had cast ballots nationwide to give the president increased powers. But the opposition dismissed that figure as fabricated, pointing to reports of empty polling stations and citing anonymous government sources as putting the figure at just under 2.5 million. The United States has already imposed sanctions on several Venezuelan individuals and organisations, but, in taking the rare step of targeting a sitting head of state by name, it signalled growing alarm at the crisis. UK Secretary of State for Foreign and Commonwealth Affairs, Boris Johnson warned that Venezuela "stands on the brink of disaster" following the contentious vote.

== August ==
- 1 August - Leopoldo López and Antonio Ledezma under house arrest were dragged from their homes in midnight SEBIN raids and placed back into Ramo Verde Prison. The U.S. Secretary of Department of State Rex Tillerson on Twitter wrote: "Or Maduro decides that it is unfeasible and wants to leave on his own count or we return government back to the Constitution."
- 2 August - The Bolivarian National Guard seizes the Palacio Federal Legislativo in order to install the 2017 Constitutional Assembly of Venezuela. Smartmatic, the computing company that runs CNE's voting machines, stated that the results of the 2017 Constituency Assembly election were tampered with by the CNE. The Smartmatic CEO Antonio Mugica said: "We know, without a doubt, that the result of the recent elections for a National Constituent Assembly were manipulated," and added "We estimate that the difference between actual and announced participation by the authorities is at least one million votes". Reuters also reported that according to internal CNE documents leaked to the agency, only 3,720,465 votes were cast thirty minutes before polls were expected to close, though polls were open for an additional hour. The president Maduro stood by the official count of more than 8 million votes and said an additional 2 million people would have voted if they had not been blocked by opposition protesters. "That stupid guy, the president of Smartmatic, pressured to the neck by the gringos and the Britains, said there were 7.5 million [voters]", Maduro said in televised remarks. "I think there were 10 million Venezuelans who went out." The CNE principal rector Tibisay Lucena dismissed Mugica's allegations, calling it an "opinion" of a company (Smartmatic) that played only a secondary role in the election and had no access to complete data. Julio Borges, the leader of the opposition-held parliament, said voter fraud was "the most serious crime that can be committed against democracy". Meanwhile, international pressure mounted on president Maduro as his country and government became increasingly isolated after Federica Mogherini, the European Union's high representative for foreign affairs, said in a statement that the union would not recognise the new constituent assembly due to "concerns over its effective representativeness and legitimacy".
- 3 August - South American bloc Mercosur begins to trigger its democratic clause to suspend Venezuela indefinitely furthering its past temporary suspension and not allowing the country to rejoin until the crisis is resolved.
- 4 August - Antonio Ledezma was sent back home where he has been placed under house arrest and unable to express himself publicly. The 2017 Constitutional Assembly of Venezuela is sworn in and for its first act, dissolves the opposition-led National Assembly which had been elected into office in late-2015. The Constituent Assembly brings large portraits of Chávez and Simón Bolívar, placing them in the Palacio Federal Legislativo to show support for the Bolivarian government. A pro-opposition march intended to arrive at the Palacio Federal Legislativo was blocked by Venezuelan authorities who fired tear gas and shotguns at protesters. Earlier, the Holy See had asked the Venezuelan government to maintain the current Constitution and prevent or suspend the Constituent Assembly, which must be installed on the same day, and once again expresses its deep concern about the radicalization and worsening of the crisis in the Bolivarian Republic of Venezuela, due to the increase in the number of deaths, injuries and detainees.
- 5 August - Luisa Ortega Diaz was dismissed as Prosecutor General by the newly established National Constitutional Assembly. National Guardsmen block entry into the Public Ministry headquarters preventing Ortega Diaz, from entering the facility.

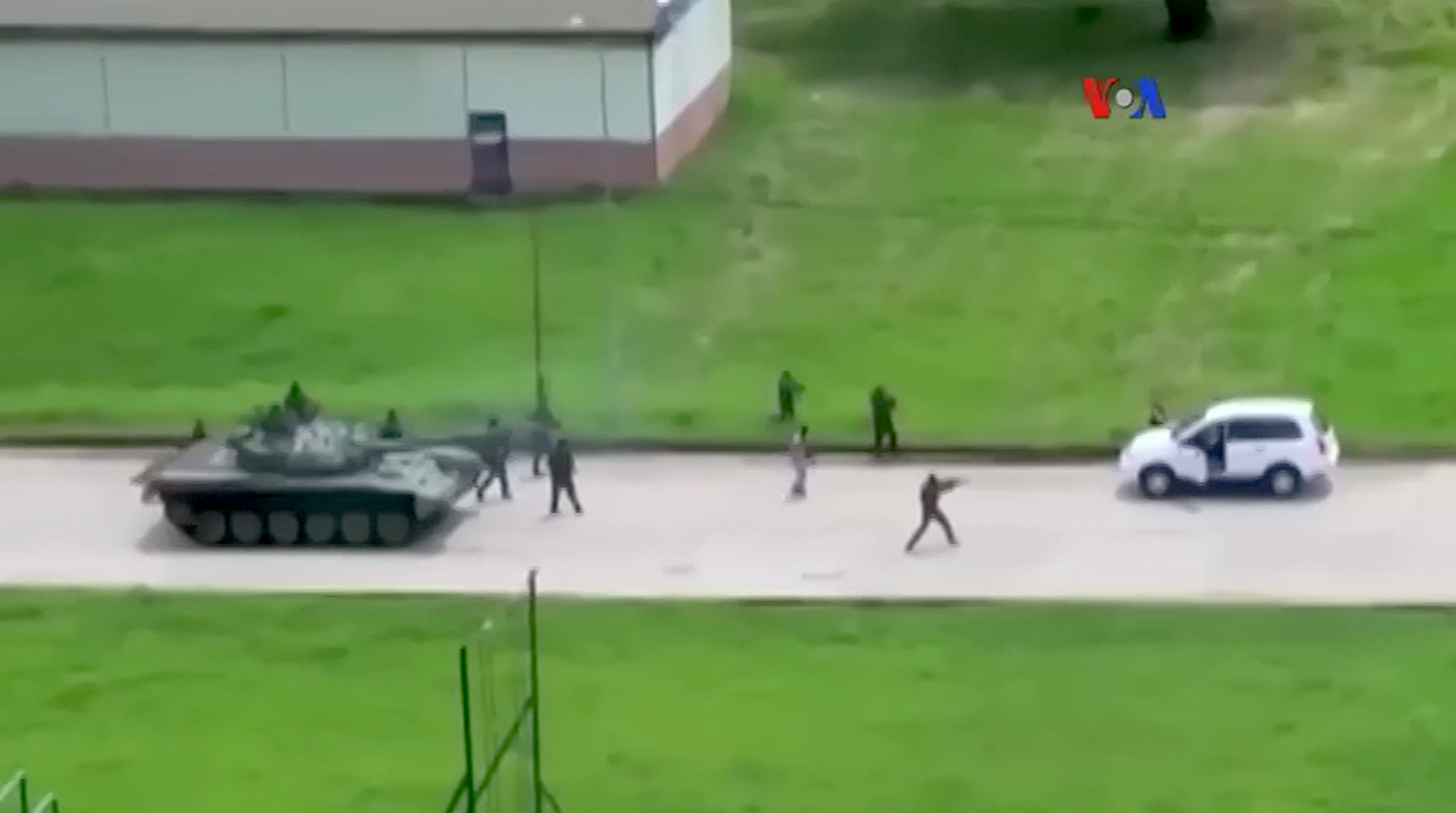
A tank and soldiers detain occupants of a vehicle following the 6 August attack on Paramacay Military Base.

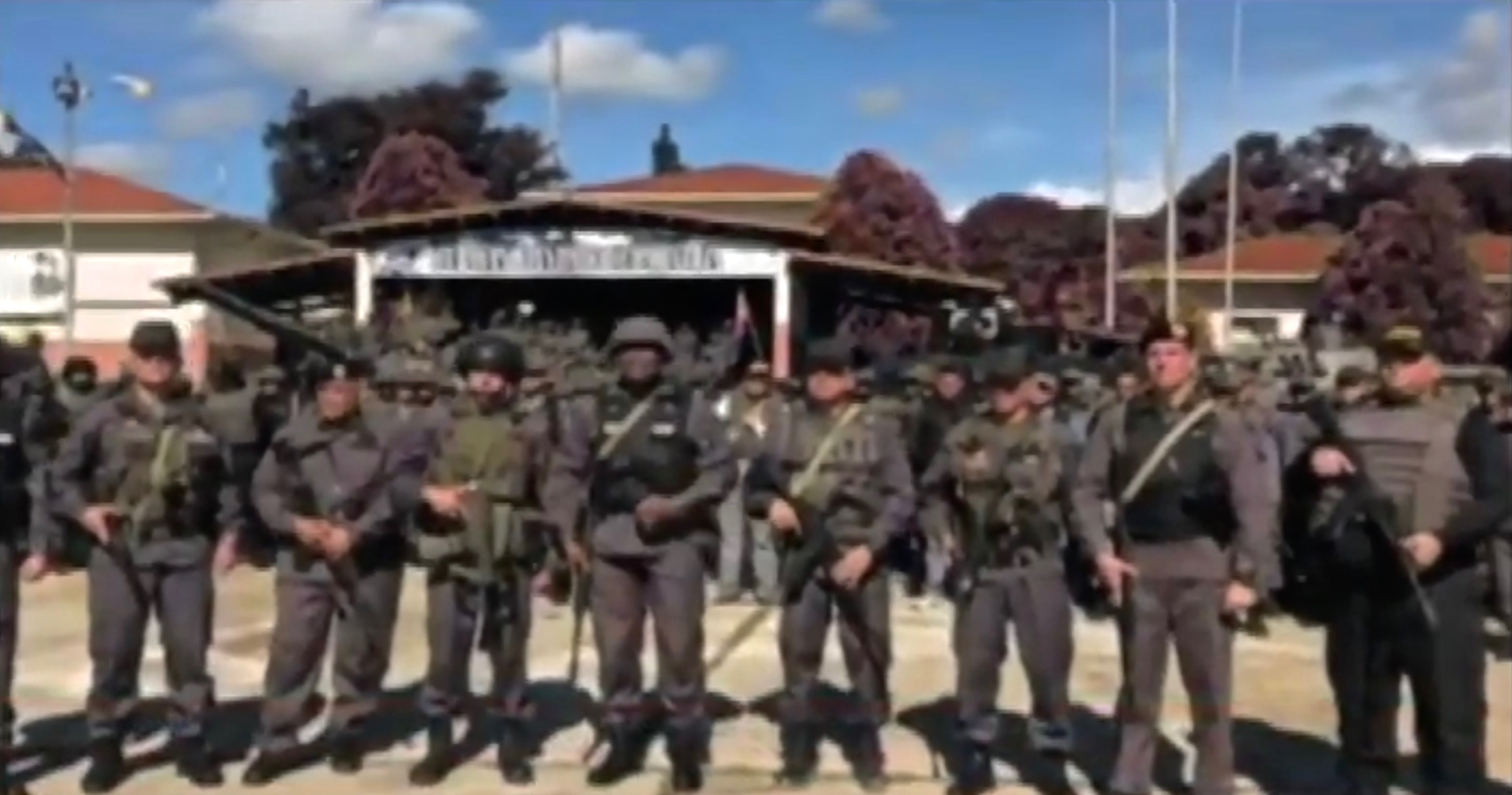
Venezuelan troops following the recapture of Paramacay Military Base

- 6 August - Approximately 20 individuals led by fugitive Captain Juan Caguaripano's 41st Brigade attack Paramacay Military Base near Valencia, Venezuela at 4:30AM VET, with a gun battle ensuing. By 8:00AM VET, about half of the attackers escaped from the base with military weapons while two attackers were killed, one seriously injured and seven were captured. Residents throughout Valencia and the state of Carabobo began to protest chanting "Freedom", though they were mostly dispersed by Venezuelan authorities. Reports of explosions heard throughout the city continued into the afternoon hours. In total, Captain Juan Caguaripano's troops stole 97 AK-103 rifles and 182 magazines; 5 40 mm grenade launchers and 140 40 mm grenades; 41 bayonets and 6 pistols.
- 7 August - Leopoldo Lopez was sent back home where he has been placed under house arrest and unable to express himself publicly.
- 8 August - The opposition holds a national trancazo that has a low turnout, with authorities promptly dispersing protesters and removing barricades in eastern Caracas.
- 9 August - New sanctions are placed on Venezuela by the United States against eight individuals to deter "further democratic backsliding" in the country.
- 11 August - Reports emerge that judges that the opposition-led National Assembly chose to be part of a separate supreme court had begun to flee Venezuela out of fear of imprisonment, with some fleeing by boat and to the embassies of foreign governments. The Bolivarian government bans the departure and use of private watercraft and boats. Venezuelan Minister of Defense, Vladimir Padrino López, announces that Captain Juan Caguaripano and First Lieutenant Yefferson García Dos Ramos, two leaders of the attack on the Paramacay Military Base, were captured in Caracas. The US President Donald Trump said that he is "not going to rule out a military option" to confront the autocratic government of Nicolás Maduro and the deepening crisis in Venezuela. Venezuela's Defense Minister Vladimir Padrino López immediately criticized Trump for his statement, calling it "an act of supreme extremism" and "an act of madness." The Venezuelan communications minister, Ernesto Villegas, said Trump's words amounted to "an unprecedented threat to national sovereignty." President Maduro's son, Nicolás Maduro Guerra, stated during the 5th Constituent Assembly of Venezuela session that if the United States were to attack Venezuela, "the rifles would arrive in New York, Mr. Trump, we would arrive and take the White House". Peruvian President Pedro Pablo Kuczynski expels Venezuela's ambassador to Peru, calling Maduro a "dictator" in protest.
- 12 August - An opposition march is held with little participation, with only about 1,000 participants. Venezuelans state that they have lost interest in the protest movement due to the fear of repression and because of their anger towards the conflicted opposition, expressing their disapproval with the opposition's decision to participate in Venezuela's fraudulent electoral processes.
- 16 August - Security forces raid a prison in Puerto Ayacucho, Amazonas State, with 37 inmates killed in what Amazonas Governor Liborio Guarulla calls a "massacre".
- 18 August - The National Constituent Assembly votes unanimously to assume the powers of the opposition-led National Assembly.
- 30 August - On the month anniversary following the Constituent Assembly, about 200 protesters organized by neighborhood organizations gathered in eastern Caracas to protest against the government in one of the first protests since the election.

== September ==
- 19 September - President of the Constituent National Assembly Delcy Rodríguez stated that during the months of protest, Venezuelan authorities acted "in strict compliance with the Constitution of the Republic and the laws" and that the government "completely shielded the performance of security agencies".
- 23 September - Resistance protesters gathered in Chacao to peacefully protest, with the protest being dispersed after the march entered the Sambil mall while some demonstrators were also detained.
- 25 September - Protesters are dispersed by the National Guard in Chacao after blocking Francisco de Miranda Avenue, with a few demonstrators being arrested.

== October ==
- 2 October - Sporadic protests occur in Caracas on International Nonviolence Day, with demonstrators demanding the right to peacefully protest.
- 15 October - Regional elections are held with "the National Electoral Council, which is subservient to the government, said President Nicolás Maduro's socialist party won 17 of 23 governorships across the country" while the opposition won 5 governorships. Sporadic protests occur in the country. The MUD opposition coalition immediately prepared to organize protests calling the results fraudulent.
- 16 October - Three MUD activists are arrested in the early morning while protesting near a Regional Electoral Office in the state of Bolivar. Minister of Interior Justice and Peace, Néstor Reverol, announces a nationwide ban of protests and gatherings until 3 November 2017.

== November ==
- 1 November - Attorney General Tarek William Saab announces preliminary plans to prosecute individuals involved with organizing protests.
- 4 November - The Supreme Tribunal of Justice called for the diplomatic immunity of Freddy Guevara, the vice president of the National Assembly, to be lifted, accusing him of leading protests.
- 23 November - Oscar Pérez, who participated in the Caracas helicopter incident, appeared for a third time to the public on an internet video. He sat beside a man who criticized the corruption of the Bolivarian government. As the video concluded, Pérez shared his only words, calling for renewed protests by the Venezuelan people, stating "the generals without troops are nobody".

== December ==
- 2 December - Talks between the moderate opposition parties and the Bolivarian government stall as neither side compromises, with further talks scheduled to begin on 15 December.
- 11 December - President Maduro announces that the three main opposition parties, Justice First, Democratic Action, and Popular Will would be banned from participating in the 2018 presidential election because of their boycott of the municipal elections on 10 December.
- 24 December - The final death during the 2017 protests occurs on Christmas Eve when an 18 year old pregnant woman was caught in a protest over limited amounts of pork. She was shot and killed by a National Guardsman at the scene who was later arrested.
- 25 December - Scattered protests and looting occurred on Christmas Day in Venezuela due to the shortages, inflation, gasoline rationing and power outages. Venezuelan military personnel were stationed at petrol stations to ration amounts purchased by drivers.
- 27 December - Sporadic protests, with groups no larger than fifty people, continue throughout the country with Venezuelans demanding food and gasoline.

== See also ==
- Timeline of the 2014 Venezuelan protests
- Timeline of the 2015 Venezuelan protests
- Timeline of the 2016 Venezuelan protests
- Timeline of the 2018 Venezuelan protests
- Timeline of the 2019 Venezuelan protests
