= Universidad Experimental Politécnica =

Universidad Experimental Politécnica or Universidad Nacional Experimental Politécnica may refer to:

- Universidad Experimental Politécnica Antonio José de Sucre
- Universidad Nacional Experimental Politécnica de la Fuerza Armada Bolivariana, or, in English, the National Experimental University of the Armed Forces
