= Universidad Experimental Politécnica Antonio José de Sucre =

Coordinates: 8.27972°N 62.73014°W

Universidad Experimental Politécnica Antonio José de Sucre Vicerectorado Luis Caballero Mejías is a university in Caracas.
