= Attack on Fort Paramacay =

2017 military assault in Venezuela

- Part of Crisis in Venezuela (2010–present)
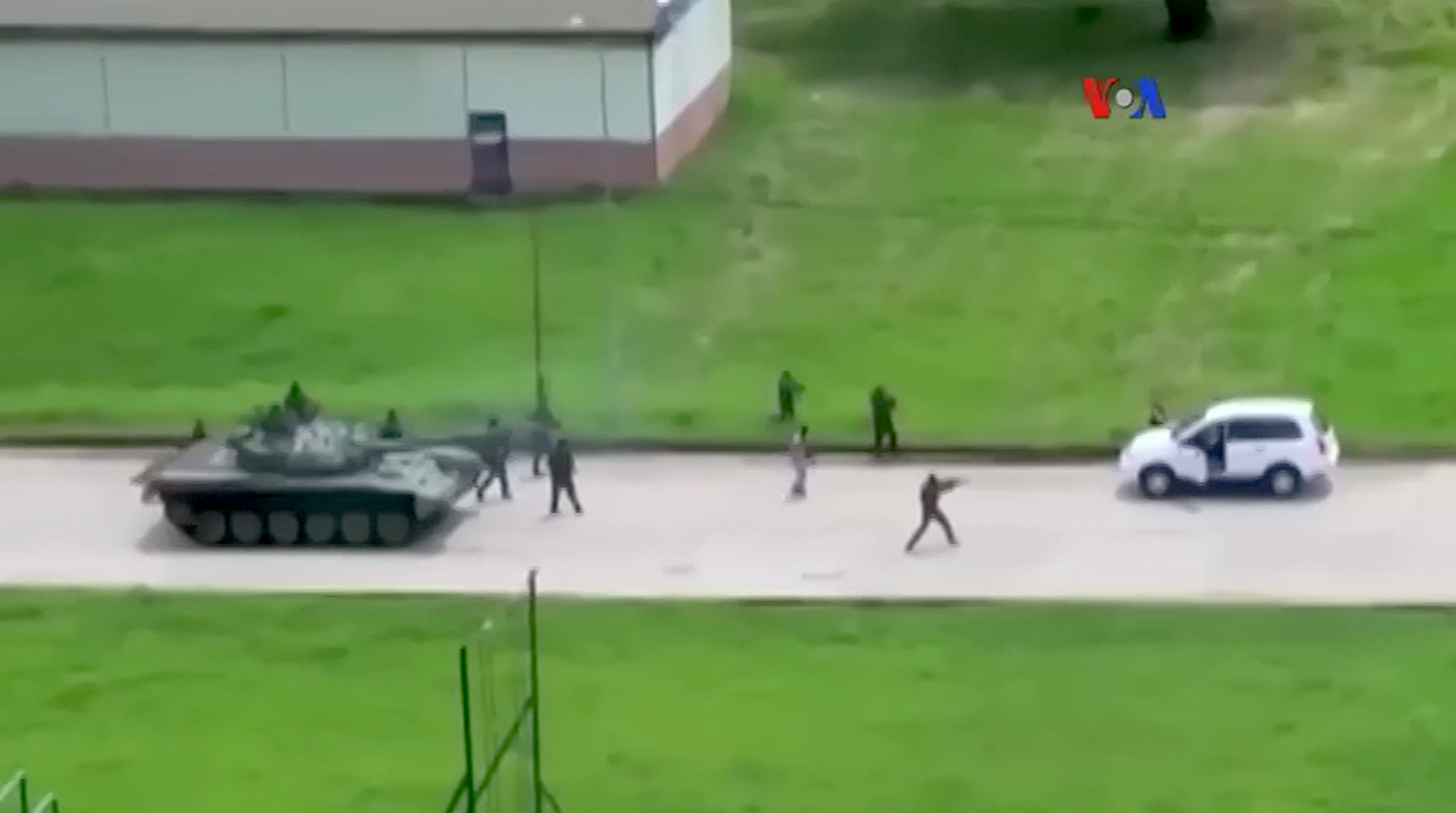
- Soldiers detain the occupants of a vehicle after the assault.
| Date | 6 August 2017 |
| Location | Naguanagua, Carabobo, Venezuela |
| Result | Rebel attack repelled by government forces; some weapons captured by the opposition. |

Belligerents
| Venezuela Bolivarian government: Venezuelan Army Supported by Venezuelan National Guard | Opposition military personnel: Military dissidents; Supported by Civilian opposition |

Commanders and leaders
| Vladimir Padrino López (Commander-in-chief) | Juan Caguaripano (Commander) |

Strength
| approx. 900 soldiers of the 41st Command Brigade | 20 dissidents |

Casualties and losses
| Unknown | 2 dead 1 injured 7 captured |

The attack on Fort Paramacay (code name Operation David), was a military assault carried out in the morning of Sunday, August 6, 2017, between 3:50 a.m. and 8:00 a.m. in the Venezuelan town of Naguanagua, Carabobo.

== Attack ==
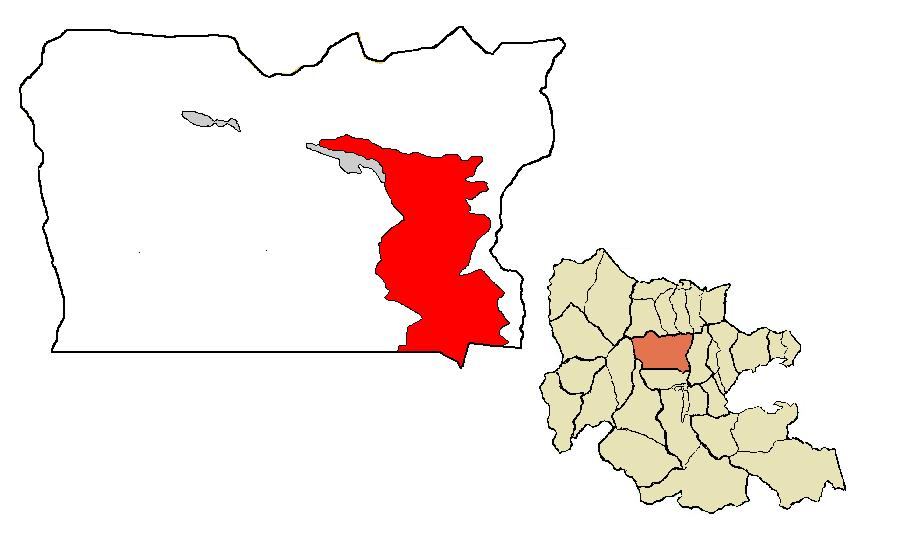
The fort is in the town of Naguanagua within the municipality of Naguanagua, within the state of Carabobo.

The assault began when a group of 20 civilian dissidents commanded by Juan Caguaripano, a former captain (deserter since 2014) of the National Guard, stormed the Fort to steal weapons. First Lieutenant Jefferson García, of the plaza 4101 Commando Company, was the officer in charge of the Fort's weapons store; the 41st brigade of the Bolivarian Army was based at the Fort. Troops loyal to the government stopped the attack, causing ten of the dissidents (including Caguaripano) to flee, with seven of the group arrested, two dead, and one injured. The attackers who escaped had managed to take a considerable amount of munitions, including grenades and bullets. Though the attack ended at 8:00 am, civilians were protesting in the streets of the city later that day in support of the dissidents, which caused several clashes between them and the National Guard.

== Stolen armaments ==
During the attack, the dissidents stole 500 AK-103 rifles and 500 magazines, 50 40mm multiple grenade launchers and 140 40mm grenades, 80 bayonets, 60 pistols and magazines. The weapons were placed in a Toyota vehicle with military plates and removed from Fort Paramacay.

== Capture ==
Some of the members and leaders of the attack were captured in the following days. Two of the dissidents were reported by the government to have been killed during the assault: Yhonny Emisael Martínez Cedeño and Orlando Segundo Landino.

On January 15, 2018, after the El Junquito raid, where the dissident Óscar Alberto Pérez was killed, some of those who had been involved in this assault were also killed, and the owner of the truck with the stolen weaponry was captured.

== See also ==
- 2017 Venezuelan constitutional crisis
- 2017 Venezuelan National Assembly attack
- Caracas helicopter incident
- El Junquito raid
- Operation Gideon (2020)
