= List of attacks on high courts =

The following is a list of attacks on state or national high courts or judicial buildings.

Attack	Date	Country	Details
Bogotazo	9 April 1948	Colombia	Rioters angered by the assassination of Jorge Eliécer Gaitán set the Palace of Justice and other important buildings in Bogotá on fire.
Palace of Justice siege	6 November 1985	Colombia	Members of the leftist M-19 guerrilla group took over the Palace of Justice in Bogotá, and held the Supreme Court of Colombia hostage, intending to hold a trial against President Belisario Betancur. Hours later, after a military raid, the incident left almost half of the 25 Supreme Court Justices dead.
1997 Storming of the Supreme Court of Pakistan	28 November 1997	Pakistan	The Supreme Court of Pakistan was stormed by supporters of then Prime Minister Nawaz Sharif, who intended to disrupt a contempt of court hearing against him.
Bangladesh bombings	17 August 2005	Bangladesh	Around 500 bomb explosions occurred at 300 locations in 63 out of the 64 districts of Bangladesh. The bombs exploded within a half-hour period starting from 11:30 am. In Dhaka, one of which exploded near the Supreme Court Complex. An Islamist terrorist organization, Jamaat-ul-Mujahideen Bangladesh (JMB) claimed responsibility for the bombings. Another Islamic terrorist group, named Harkat-ul-Jihad al-Islami, was associated with JMB in executing the co-ordinated attack. Following the bombings, both groups were banned by the Government of Bangladesh.
Turkish Council of State shooting	17 May 2006	Turkey	A gunman made his way into the Council of State building in Ankara and subsequently shot five judges.
Caracas helicopter incident	27 June 2017	Venezuela	A police helicopter overflew the Supreme Tribunal of Justice and the Interior Ministry in Caracas. Claiming to be a part of an anti-government coalition, the occupants of the helicopter allegedly launched several grenades and fired at the building, although no one was injured or killed. The helicopter escaped and was found the next day in a rural area. On 15 January 2018, Óscar Pérez, the pilot and instigator of the incident, was killed during a military raid by the Venezuelan army that was met with accusations of extrajudicial killing.
8 January Brasília attacks	8 January 2023	Brazil	Supporters of former president Jair Bolsonaro stormed the Supreme Federal Court along with other top-level government buildings.
	2 January 2024	United States	A man leaving the scene of a car accident entered the Colorado Supreme Court in Denver through a window and seized a key from a guard, opening fire inside the building until he surrendered to police.
	13 November 2024	Brazil	A suicide bomber detonated himself near the Supreme Federal Court in Brasília after failing to enter the building.
2025 assassination of Iranian Supreme Court judges	18 January 2025	Iran	A gunman opened fire inside the Palace of Justice in Tehran, killing two judges of the Supreme Court of Iran and injuring a bodyguard. He then committed suicide.
2025 Nepalese Gen Z protests	9 September 2025	Nepal	Protesters set fire to the Supreme Court of Nepal in Kathmandu.

== See also ==
- List of attacks on legislatures
