= Oscar Perez: The Movie =

- Poster
- Directed by: Vanessa White
- Written by: Vanessa White
- Produced by: Daniel Lara Farias
- Production company: Postproduction
- Release date: 19 April 2026
- Running time: 90 minutes
- Countries: United States; Venezuela
- Language: Spanish

Oscar Perez: The Movie (Vie et mort d'Óscar Pérez) is a 2026 Venezuelan / American documentary that tells the story of former Venezuelan police officer Óscar Alberto Pérez, until his rebellion against the Venezuela regimen. The film was produced by Daniel Lara Farias, Daniel Bethancourt and Leonardo Moleiro. It was directed by Vanessa White.

The documentary was released in Madrid, Spain, on 19 April 2026.

== Plot ==
Óscar Pérez, an elite police officer, accused Nicolás Maduro and his cabinet of running Venezuela as a narco-terrorist enterprise and embarked on a mission to bring them to international justice. The regime hunted him down and executed him in front of the entire nation.

Through his own voice, testimonies from his mother, family members, colleagues, and allies, and an archive of evidence composed of citizen footage, official documents, and expert reports, the documentary traces the journey of this operation to its execution at the hands of state security forces, revealing the cost of freedom.

== Interview ==
Some people who appear in the documentary are:

- Aminta Perez, mother of Oscar Perez
- Dana Vivas, ex-wife of Oscar Perez
- Armando Perez, brother of Oscar Perez
- Harold Castro, aeronautical photo reporter
- Zair Amundaray, general director of procedural direction of the Cuerpo de Investigaciones Científicas, Penales y Criminalísticas (CICPC)
- Victor Amaran, former CICPC officer
- Joseph Humire, deputy assistant secretary of war for American Security Affairs
