= El Junquito =

Coordinates: 10.4611°N 67.0807°W

- Parish
- Country: Venezuela
- Federal district: Distrito Capital
- Municipality: Libertador

Area
  - Total: 56.0 km^{2} (21.6 sq mi)

Population (2011)
  - Total: 63,800
  - Density: 1,140/km^{2} (2,950/sq mi)

El Junquito is one of the 22 parishes located in the Libertador Bolivarian Municipality and one of 32 of Caracas, Venezuela.

== Raid ==
On January 15, 2018, the parish was the place of a raid, which killed Óscar Alberto Pérez and other members after he crashed a MBB Bo 105 helicopter after he was fired gunfire and having thrown several grenades and firing at a government building in June 2017.
