= Bladimir Lugo =

Venezuelan colonel, born 1968

Personal details
- Born: Bladimir Humberto Lugo Armas; November 18, 1968 (age 57) Punta de Mata, Monagas, Venezuela
- Known for: Human rights violator

Military service
- Allegiance: Venezuela
- Branch/service: Venezuelan National Guard
- Years of service: 1990–present
- Rank: Brigadier general
- Awards: Cross of the Presidential Guard

Bladimir Humberto Lugo Armas (born 18 November 1968) is a brigadier general of the Venezuelan National Guard. By 2017, he was the commander of the unit of this force that guarded the Federal Legislative Palace, the government buildings of Venezuela.

On 29 June 2017, he was decorated by President Nicolás Maduro with the order of the Cross of the Presidential Guard. In light of human rights abuses against journalists, Venezuelan opposition politicians, and political opponents of Maduro, Lugo is currently subject to international sanctions from countries including the United States, Canada, and Panama.

== Career ==
Bladimir Lugo has served in the Venezuelan National Guard (GNB) for two decades. In 2004, according to Gaceta Oficial (government communication) No. 38042, Lugo was appointed to the Investigative Council. During the tenure of defense minister Carmen Meléndez from July 2013 to October 2014, Lugo served as commander of the Miranda regiment of the National Command of the People's Guard.

As of May 2019, Lugo currently serves as head of GNB Zone 11 Command (formerly known as Core 3) in Zulia state, replacing Brigadier General Alfonso Torres Páez, who died when the helicopter he was riding in, "Patriot", crashed in the parking lot of the Maracaibo bullring on 25 April 2019.

== Incidents and controversies ==
Serving as a high-ranking officer, Lugo has been accused of violence and seen other controversies regarding his or his staff's action or inaction in political situations.

=== Violence ===
==== Court summons ====
On 13 July 2017, the Public Ministry of Venezuela summoned Lugo for several cases of aggression against journalists, women, deputies, and demonstrators. These charges include the allegation that in December 2016, he assaulted NTN24 journalist Rafael Hernández and his work team, preventing him from entering the country's seat of the Vice President; an allegation that Lugo also pushed and tripped Antonieta Mendoza, the mother of imprisoned opposition leader Leopoldo López; and that on 28 June 2017 he pushed the president of the National Assembly, Julio Borges.

Venezuelan banker Eligio Cedeño accused Lugo of being involved in the kidnapping of the Faddoul brothers in 2006, who were later found dead along with Cedeño's driver, and the kidnapping of Cedeño's daughter in 2005. At this time, the trial court ordered his investigation.

==== 2017 Venezuelan National Assembly attack ====
External videos
- Colonel Vladimir Lugo Armas pushes the president of the National Assembly, Julio Borges on YouTube

Members of the Bolivarian National Guard storming the National Assembly

On 27 June 2017, following the Caracas helicopter incident, Bolivarian National Guardsmen stormed the National Assembly and assaulted the largely opposition legislative body. Images were published showing Lugo snapping his hand in the face of National Assembly speaker Julio Borges and later forcibly pushing the speaker through a door. Other reports state that journalists were held captive by violent government supporters outside the building for over four hours without any intervention from the National Guard in the area.

Two days later on 29 June 2017, Lugo was promoted by President Maduro and was granted the Order of the Presidential Guard Cross and the Medal of Honor of Merit under the banner of the National Guard.

Lugo was the commander of the unit that guarded the National Assembly when there were attacks against deputies and other people with the help of the National Guard on 5 July 2017.

=== Disruptive orders ===
==== 2017 Venezuelan referendum ====
On 16 July 2017, during the national referendum, Lugo was in charge of the security of the voting center near the El Carmen church in Caracas. In the afternoon, pro-government and opposition parties clashed in Catia until pro-government motorcyclists shot at citizens who were in the voting center, resulting in one deceased and three wounded. According to Popular Will leader Pedro Benítez, and witnesses of the attack, Lugo refused to act to avoid a confrontation between the two groups, responding "that's not [his] problem".

==== Óscar Pérez burial ====
On 21 January 2018, journalist Nelson Bocaranda reported that Lugo had been in charge of moving the body of Óscar Pérez to the Cementerio del Este burial site in Caracas, and accuses him of being the one to close access to prevent the entry of relatives and other people to the site.

==== Blocking the Assembly and alleged assaults on journalists ====
On 17 April 2018, on Lugo's orders, journalists were barred from entering the Federal Legislative Palace during the approval of the prosecution of Nicolás Maduro for acts of corruption requested by the Supreme Tribunal of Justice of Venezuela in exile. Lugo had the journalists wait for over an hour at the corner of San Francisco before finally deciding that they would not have access.

On 15 May 2018, Lugo and officials of the Bolivarian National Guard were reported to have assaulted journalists and National Assembly deputies outside the National Constituent Assembly, denying them access. The National Union of Workers of the Press of Venezuela reported that it was the sixth time in less than a month in which press were denied access to the Federal Legislative Palace, with the first time occurring on 17 April.

Tinedo Guía, the president of the National Association of Journalists (CNP), rejected the continuous violence towards journalists carried out by National Guardsmen commanded by Lugo, declaring him persona non grata. Additionally, due to violence, the College of Journalists alerted the international community to threats to freedom of expression in Venezuela and urged the Plan República and the various actors part of the 2018 presidential election process to respect and facilitate the work of the journalists and communicators during the elections.

== Sanctions ==
As the commander of the unit responsible for guarding the National Assembly, which has an opposition majority, Lugo has been accused of assaults and human rights abuses against journalists, Venezuelan opposition politicians, and political opponents of Maduro. As a response to these actions, several countries have placed international sanctions on Lugo.

On 9 August 2017, the United States Department of the Treasury placed sanctions on Lugo for his position in the Constituent National Assembly of Venezuela. His role is to provide security for the Federal Legislative Palace, which houses the pro-opposition National Assembly and the pro-government National Constituent Assembly.

On 22 September 2017, the Canadian government sanctioned Lugo due to alleged "rupture of Venezuela's constitutional order" and prohibited Canadian citizens from dealing with him.

On 29 March 2018, the Panamanian government sanctioned Lugo for his alleged involvement with "money laundering, financing of terrorism and financing the proliferation of weapons of mass destruction".
