= Murder of the Faddoul brothers =

Venezuelan brothers murdered in Caracas

Faddoul Brothers
- Disappeared: 23 February 2006
- Died: Caracas, Venezuela
- Cause of death: Homicide
- Body discovered: 4 April 2006
- Known for: Murder victims

The Faddoul Brothers were three young Venezuelans, children of a Canadian-Lebanese businessman, who were kidnapped on 23 February 2006 in Caracas, along with their driver Miguel Rivas. The bodies of the four were subsequently found on 4 April 2006. The murder of the brothers caused outrage throughout Venezuela and mass protests occurred in Caracas against crime in Venezuela.

== Kidnapping and death ==
Faddoul brothers, Jason, Kevin and John Bryan Faddoul, 12, 13 and 17 years respectively, were kidnapped at dawn on 23 February 2006 when their driver Miguel Rivas was driving to their school, Our Lady of the Valley. Individuals dressed in the Caracas Metropolitan Police uniform improvised a police post in Vista Alegre. The next day, the kidnappers called the Faddoul family and demanded Bs. 10 billion (US$4.5 million). The prosecutor assigned to the case confirmed that the Metropolitan Police command had not assigned any police post in the urbanization the day the kidnapping took place.

At the end of March the brothers' father, Hanna Faddoul, received the call from one of the kidnappers, who informed him that the sum of the ransom had been reduced to Bs. 700 million. After gathering part of the rescue, Bs.500 million, Gladys Diab de Faddoul's brother, José Diab, was responsible for delivering the sum of the rescue. For various reasons, the delivery of money and the rescue of the Faddoul brothers failed: Diab moved to the agreed site followed by hidden police officers; the criminals realized the police operation and aborted the exchange.

On 4 April 2006, Yare municipal police officers found the bodies with shotgun shots in the head and abandoned in a wooded area of San Francisco de Yare.

== Reactions ==
Police officers examine the bodies of the three Faddoul brothers and the family driver, found dead on 4 April 2006

=== Initial Reaction ===
On 31 March 2006, more than 500 students and teachers from four schools in the Vista Alegre and Bella Vista urbanizations marched in these urbanizations to protest the kidnapping and demanding more attention from the national government. On 2 April 2006, hundreds of people walked from Quebrada Honda to La Chiquinquirá Church to participate in a mass held by the then Cardinal Jorge Urosa Savino prior to knowing about the murder of the brothers.

=== After murders were discovered ===
After bodies were discovered, the Minister of Interior and Justice, Jesse Chacón, offered a statement almost at midnight to express his condolences to the family of the victims: "We deeply regret that, despite the efforts made by so many people, we could not avoid this abominable crime."

The next day, students from the Andrés Bello Catholic University and the Central University of Venezuela blocked main roads. There were also protests in front of Monteávila University, the Metropolitan University and Francisco de Miranda Avenue; other roads collapsed by the protests were Baralt Avenue and Urdaneta Avenue, in front of the Ministry of Interior and Justice, where protesters demanded justice for the murder of the Faddoul brothers and Miguel Rivas.

Photographer Jorge Aguirre, of the Capriles Chain, was shot in the chest by an alleged motorized police force while covering the protest at the UCV. In the afternoon, university students and residents of the Chacao Municipality gathered in Plaza Francia to hold a vigil for the murder of teenagers. An hour later they decided to move to the Francisco Fajardo highway to demonstrate, but the National Guard did not allow them.

Other cities in which there were protests were the cities of Valencia, Maracay, Puerto Ordaz, Lechería, San Cristóbal, Mérida and Porlamar, in which they demand the resignation of Jesse Chacón and the general prosecutor Isaías Rodríguez.

== Responsibility ==
During the month of March 2006, the CICPC conducted an investigation of the Metropolitan Police, indicated as responsible by some witnesses. On April 6, Julia Charte was arrested, responsible for feeding the brothers during the time they were kidnapped. Charte's testimony led to a series of raids that culminated in the arrest of almost twenty people, of whom seventeen received the maximum sentence of thirty years for their participation in the kidnapping and killing of the victims. Among those sentenced to maximum sentence, four were members of the Metropolitan Police as reported by the Public Ministry.

Lennon Gandica, also known as "El Gordo Lennon", noted as the material author of the death of the Faddoul brothers and of having participated in the kidnapping and subsequent murder of the Italo-Venezuelan businessman Filippo Sindoni, was captured by Poliaragua officers on 18 July 2015 during a raid in the town of Guanayén, Aragua state. During the months of October and November 2015, Lennon was suffocated in the spotlight the detainee in Alayón, Maracay in Aragua state.

In 2017, banker Eligio Cedeño blamed the Venezuelan National Guard colonel Bladimir Lugo for being involved in the kidnapping of the Faddoul brothers and the kidnapping of his daughter in 2005, when the trial court ordered his investigation.

== See also ==
- List of kidnappings
- List of solved missing person cases (2000s)
