= Douglas Rico =

Venezuelan policeman (born 1969)

Douglas Arnoldo Rico González (born 28 September 1969) is a Venezuelan policeman, current director of the Corps of Scientific, Criminal and Criminal Investigations (CICPC).

== Career ==
In May 2013, President Nicolás Maduro announced the appointment of José Gregorio Sierralta and Douglas Rico as director and deputy director, respectively, of the Corps of Scientific, Criminal and Criminal Investigations (CICPC), and on 5 February 2016 Maduro announced the appointment de Rico as director of the CICPC. In 2018, Rico was ratified as director of the organization.

In 2016, Rico published the book called "For your safety" (Spanish: Por tu seguridad). The commissioner indicated that the issue was intended to promote crime prevention.

In 2019, the National Assembly summoned Rico after police officers withdrew from a confrontation with criminal gangs. During his tenure, Rico intervened the Anti-Extortion and Kidnapping Division of the CICPC in Caracas for "alleged police malpractice" and later announced its separation.

== Sanctions ==
Disavowing the December 2020 Venezuelan parliamentary election, on 22 February 2021, the European Union sanctioned 19 officials of the Maduro administration, including Rico, for what they characterized as violations of fundamental human rights and democratic principles.
