= Muerte suspendida =

2015 Venezuelan film

- Directed by: Óscar Rivas Gamboa
- Written by: Carmelo Castro; Óscar Rivas Gamboa
- Starring: Zapata 666; Mayra Africano; Asdrúbal Blanco
- Release date: 13 November 2015
- Country: Venezuela
- Language: Spanish

Muerte suspendida is a 2015 Venezuelan action film directed by Óscar Rivas Gamboa.

== Plot ==
Bernardino Correia, a Portuguese owner of several service stations, is kidnapped by three individuals who are sent by Orozco, an ambitious and ruthless Colombian boss.

== Production ==
Criminal investigator Óscar Pérez approached director Óscar Rivas about creating a movie to improve values among those in Venezuela's law enforcement agencies. Pérez stated that he accepted the role because he believed in justice for Venezuela and that he wanted "people to fall in love with police work in Venezuela and to feel proud".

== Reception ==
In 2015, Muerte suspendida was released to the public, with Pérez serving as a protagonist, CICPC agent Efraín Robles, while also co-producing the film with information and equipment provided by CICPC. After Muerte suspendida became Venezuela's second-highest-grossing movie in 2015, a second movie was going to be created, though there were not enough resources in the country.
