= Juan Caguaripano =

Venezuelan military officer

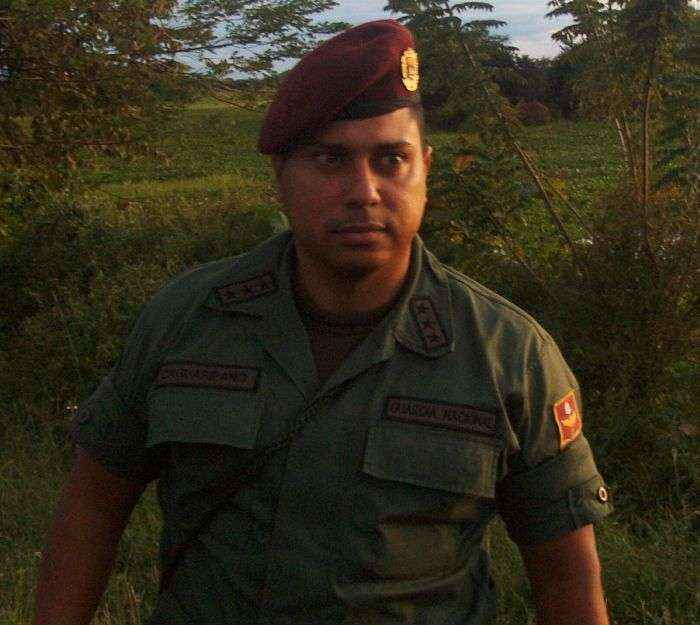
- Birth name: Juan Carlos Caguaripano Scott
- Born: 12 April 1973 (age 52) Caracas, Venezuela
- Branch: National Guard of Venezuela
- Rank: Captain
- Commands: Commander of the 41st Armored Brigade of the Carabobo state
- Conflicts: Attack on Fort Paramacay

Juan Carlos Caguaripano Scott (born 12 April 1973) is a Venezuelan military officer and dissident, captain of the Bolivarian National Guard (GNB) graduated from the Officers Training School of the Armed Forces of Cooperation (EFOFAC).

== Career ==
Caguaripano was a captain in the Bolivarian National Guard and has claimed that in 2008 he was accused of an alleged conspiracy, which caused a two-year delay in his military promotion. In 2014 he was discharged from the military corps for demonstrating against the government and after disseminating a video where he denounced "the violation of national sovereignty" by "Cuban agents and foreign narco-terrorist groups" in the "public and military administration". Caguaripano assured in an interview offered to CNN en Español in April 2014 that his discharge was politically motivated and that no administrative procedure had been opened against him, for which reason he was unaware of the discharge and claimed to continue being a captain. The local press reported that Caguaripano had flown to Panama after the country's intelligence corps linked him to a possible military insurrection. A year later, deputy Diosdado Cabello claimed that the soldier had connections with members of the Armed Forces to revolt.

== Uprising ==
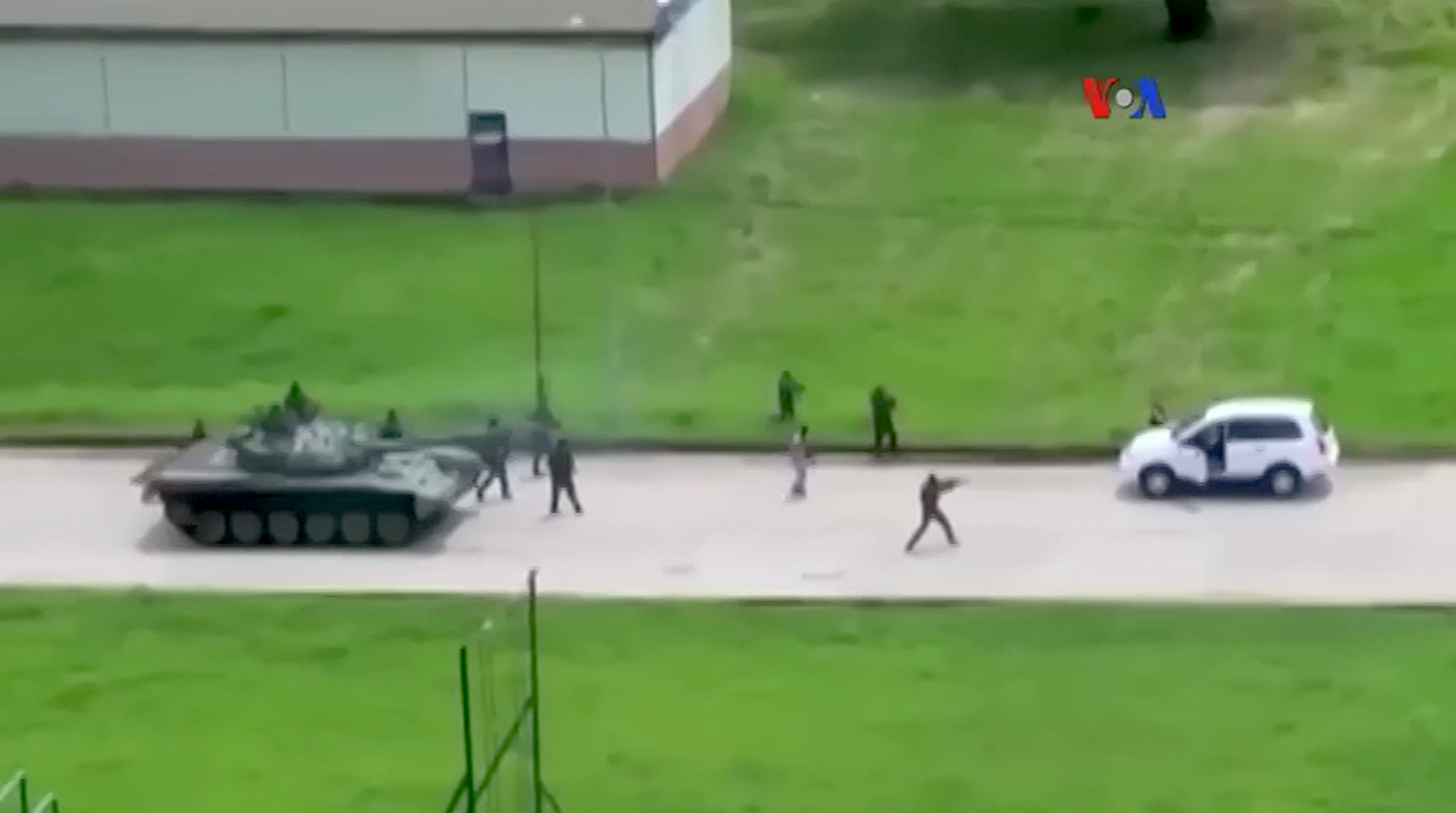
Attack on Fort Paramacay.

On 6 August 2017, during the attack on Fort Paramacay, Caguaripano released a video in which he appeared surrounded by about twenty men in military uniform carrying weapons and claimed to be the commander of the David Carabobo Operation of the 41st Armored Brigade in Valencia, assuring that in the assault he was accompanied by "officers and troops" of that military unit, as well as "active troops and reserves of all components", and demanding the immediate formation of a transitional government. Hours later, Venezuelan authorities apprehended the suspects in the 41st Armored Brigade unit.

== Detention ==
By February 2018 his lawyer, Luis Argenis Vielma, denounced that Caguaripano was being held in La Tumba of the Bolivarian Intelligence Service, in turn denounced that Caguaripano had been the victim of severe torture that caused the detachment of both testicles by the application of electric shocks, a situation that by that time had not been able to heal. The lawyer also denounced that officials of the General Directorate of Military Counterintelligence (DGCIM) went to his parents' house and arrested his mother, Ana Julia Vielma, and his brother Luis Jiménez Vielma, whom they released in the night hours of January 25, 2018, in turn, he denounced that officials of the DGCIM showed up at the school of his two daughters wearing black clothes, hooded and with long guns, demanding from the school principal the files containing the information of the girls, threatening him with arrest if he did not collaborate.

Caguaripano continues to be detained to date, has had at least eight court appearances. On September 29, 2021, he was transferred from the La Tumba prison of Bolivarian Intelligence Service in Plaza Venezuela to El Helicoide, along with Raúl Isaías Baduel. In April 2022 the United Nations Committee Against Torture asked Nicolás Maduro's administration for an investigation into the cruel treatment of Captain Caguaripano.

== See also ==
- Attack on Fort Paramacay
- Political prisoners in Venezuela
- Torture in Venezuela
