= Cuerpo Técnico de Policía Judicial =

Former venezuelan police agency

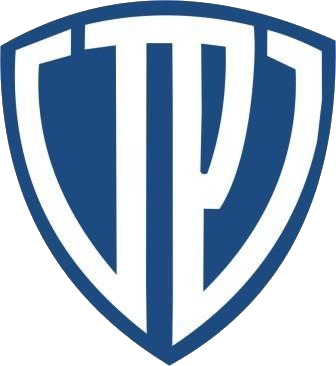
Cuerpo Técnico de Policía Judicial's logo

The Cuerpo Técnico de Policía Judicial (PTJ, by its acronym in Spanish; lit. "Judicial Police Technical Corps") was Venezuela's largest national police agency. Created in 1958, it was responsible for criminal investigations and forensic services, as well as counter-narcotics. It was replaced by the Cuerpo de Investigaciones Científicas, Penales y Criminalísticas in late 2001.

The police's central role in judicial investigation in Venezuela can be traced back to the security forces of Juan Vicente Gómez, via the Seguridad Nacional of Marcos Pérez Jiménez. The PTJ is ascribed to the Justice Ministry, creating a "hybrid of organizational dependence on the executive but functional dependence on the judiciary [which] has led to many political frictions". In many countries, the judicial police is placed in the Ministério Público (MP, Public Ministry).
