= 1997 Storming of the Supreme Court of Pakistan =

Political Event in Pakistan

On November 28, 1997, the Supreme Court of Pakistan was stormed by supporters of then Prime Minister Nawaz Sharif, who intended to disrupt a contempt of court hearing against him.

The assailants, largely from the youth wing of the Pakistan Muslim League (N) and allegedly led by some of Sharif's legislative allies, caused the hearing to be adjourned.

In reaction to this incident, the then Chief Justice of Pakistan, Syed Sajjad Ali Shah, requested military support to secure the judiciary, emphasizing the seriousness of the situation. The confrontation was part of a larger feud between Shah and Sharif, particularly concerning judicial appointments and Shah's annulment of a constitutional amendment that had previously barred lawmakers from defying party directives.

== Background ==
The tension between Syed Sajjad Ali Shah and Nawaz Sharif had been intensifying since Sharif's reinstatement in February 1997. The situation worsened in August when Shah suggested promoting five judges to the Supreme Court, a proposition resisted by Sharif who disapproved of two nominees. In a countermove, Sharif tried to reduce the number of Supreme Court judges through an ordinance, which he later retracted following opposition from the Supreme Court Bar Association of Pakistan. In retaliation, Shah initiated corruption proceedings against Sharif and filed contempt charges for his criticisms of the suspension of the anti-defection law, setting the stage for an unprecedented trial of a sitting prime minister.

The friction between the judiciary and the executive culminated in December when Shah attempted to reinforce judicial authority by overturning the 13th Amendment and holding Sharif in contempt. The action met opposition from a rival faction within the judiciary, leading to a deadlock in the Supreme Court.

Amidst this turmoil, conflicting rulings from different benches exacerbated the crisis. Despite substantial opposition, Shah pushed forward with Sharif's trial, which ultimately led to a violent takeover of the Supreme Court by Sharif's supporters.
