= Caracas helicopter incident =

Police helicopter attacks supreme court with grenades

- Part of the Crisis in Venezuela, 2017 Venezuelan protests and 2017 Venezuelan constitutional crisis
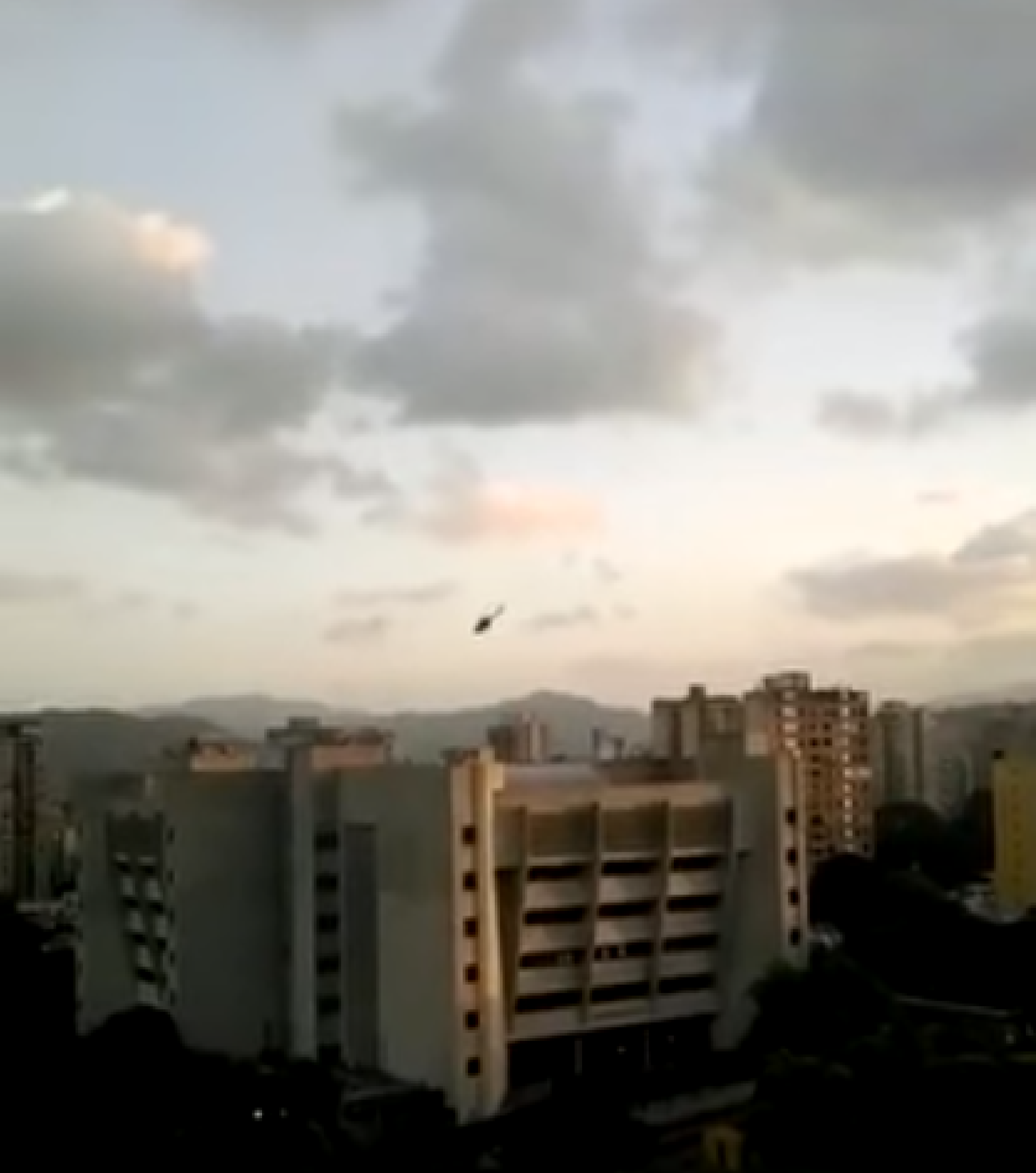
- Moment of the attack on the Supreme Court of Justice building

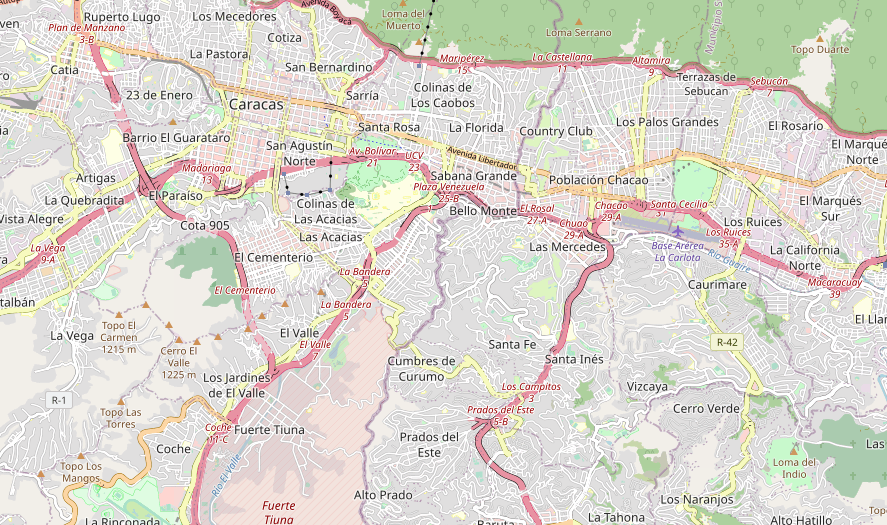
- Caracas helicopter incident (Caracas) Caracas helicopter incident (Venezuela)
- Location: 10°30′N 66°55′W; Caracas, Venezuela
- Date: 27 June 2017 (VST)
- Attack type: Helicopter attack
- Weapons: Grenades; Rifles
- Deaths: 0
- Perpetrators: Óscar Pérez and other armed individuals
- Motive: Unknown

On 27 June 2017, there was an incident involving a police helicopter at the Supreme Tribunal of Justice (TSJ) and Interior Ministry in Caracas, Venezuela. Claiming to be a part of an anti-government coalition of military, police and civilians, the occupants of the helicopter launched several grenades and fired at the building, although no one was injured or killed. President Nicolás Maduro called the incident a "terrorist attack". The helicopter escaped and was found the next day in a rural area. On 15 January 2018, Óscar Pérez, the pilot and instigator of the incident, was killed during a military raid by the Venezuelan army that was met with accusations of extrajudicial killing.

== Attacks ==
Attorney General Luisa Ortega Díaz had recently defected from the Bolivarian government, condemning its response to the 2017 Venezuelan protests and its plan to rewrite the 1999 constitution drafted by President Maduro's predecessor, Hugo Chávez. The pro-Maduro Supreme Tribunal had convened to judge matters involving Ortega Díaz. The judicial body approved motions to ban Ortega from leaving the country, to freeze her assets and to relieve her of her duties, transferring her prosecutorial powers to ombudsman Tarek William Saab, who had close ties to President Maduro.

On 27 June 2017, Maduro stated that if his government were to fail, he and his supporters would use force to reestablish the Venezuelan government.

We would never give up, and what couldn't be done with votes, we would do with weapons, we would liberate the fatherland with weapons.

— Nicolás Maduro,

That afternoon, a video was released showing men with assault rifles flanking Óscar Pérez, who was a film actor and CICPC investigator (Venezuela's criminal investigation agency); men in the video stated "We are nationalists, patriots, and institutionalists. This fight is not with the rest of the state forces, it is against the tyranny of this government." Pérez was later seen piloting a MBB Bo 105 helicopter of the CICPC over the Baruta Municipality. Blank firearm cartridges were fired near the Interior Ministry building to draw attention to his message—a banner on the helicopter read "350 Liberty", a reference to Article 350 of the Constitution of Venezuela, which states that "The people of Venezuela ... shall disown any regime, legislation or authority that violates democratic values, principles and guarantees or encroaches upon human rights".

=== Interior Ministry ===
Communications and Information Minister Ernesto Villegas said the helicopter fired fifteen shots at the Interior Ministry as a reception for 80 people celebrating National Journalists' Day was taking place. Pérez stated that non-lethal stun grenades were thrown from the helicopter onto the building to draw attention to the banner, though the Bolivarian government argued that they were four "Israeli-made grenades of Colombian origin", with two of them targeting government bodyguards outside the building. While the helicopter was near the Interior Ministry, gunfire was also heard in the area. Like the stun grenades, non-lethal blank cartridges were fired near the building to draw attention to the message on Pérez's banner.

Pérez later explained his actions, stating: "It was meant as a wake-up call that they shouldn’t lose hope ... And not just to the people but also to the public workers that they wake up as well." He also said, "There was no collateral damage because it was planned and because we are not murderers like you, Mr. Nicolás Maduro, as well as you, Diosdado Cabello; they mourn every day in Venezuelan homes."

Still speaking to the public, President Maduro abruptly announced, "I saw a little video on social media" before turning to the Minister of Communications, Ernesto Villegas, stating "You look like you have news for us." Villegas replied, saying that a "rebellious action, an armed attack from a helicopter" had occurred, with Maduro quickly responding saying that air defenses had already been deployed and telling reporters "If I have to decree, what I have to decree, I will. If I have to bring Plan Zamora to the next phase, I will". Maduro then singled out former intelligence chief and former interior minister Miguel Rodríguez Torres, claiming that Pérez was his helicopter pilot, and accusing Rodríguez Torres of working with the CIA. Like other defectors, Rodríguez had recently criticized the Maduro government for not holding a referendum prior to the Constituent Assembly.

Rodríguez replied that he only flew in SEBIN aircraft and that his pilot's name was Pedro Pérez. Hugo Carvajal, a prominent Chavista official, also defended Rodríguez stating that the CIA document allegedly linking Rodríguez to the United States agency "was garbage, bad information, and was dismissed" by Chávez in 2011.

=== National Assembly ===
National Guardsmen storming the National Assembly

Shortly after, Bolivarian National Guardsmen stormed the National Assembly, assaulting the largely opposition legislative body. Images were seen of a Colonel Vladimir Lugo Armas of the National Guard snapping his hand in the face of National Assembly speaker Julio Borges before later forcibly pushing the speaker through a door. Supporters of the Bolivarian government then gathered outside of the National Assembly building shooting fireworks toward individuals and damaging vehicles in the area. Some members of the press were beaten while government supporters threatened to cut water and power supply to the building. Journalists and members of the media were held captive by the pro-government public for more than four hours without any intervention from the National Guard in the area.

== Aftermath ==
The next day on 28 June, Vice President Tareck El Aissami reported that the helicopter used in the attack had been found in Osma, Vargas, a rural town northeast of Caracas, and that although special forces were deployed into the area, no perpetrators were arrested. The aircraft was only located after a local farmer, Reinaldo Reyes Castillo, reported that he found the helicopter had landed on his land. Reyes Castillo was later arrested and sentenced in a military court to be imprisoned in Ramo Verde Prison, a military prison where several opposition members and protesters are held prisoner.

Colonel Vladimir Lugo Armas, the National Guardsman who had confronted National Assembly speaker Julio Borges shortly after the helicopter incident, was decorated with the Cross of the Presidential Guard and the National Guard Medal of Merit Honor by President Maduro on 29 June. While speaking during the ceremony at the Theater of the Military Academy in Caracas, Maduro acknowledged Colonel Lugo's "security services within the facilities of the Federal Legislative Palace".

On 2 July, Pérez's helicopter mechanic, Juan Carlos Cutilla, was arrested by SEBIN officers, with authorities saying he was the last known person to have contact with Pérez before the incident.

On 4 July, Oscar Pérez, the helicopter's pilot, reappeared on social media commenting on the flight, protests and potential actions in the future. Pérez began by stating that the attack was planned to only strike fear as a "first phase" because the group did not consist of "murderers", further saying that President Maduro and his fellow government official Diosdado Cabello were the ones who murdered Venezuelans. He stated that he had to make an emergency landing and spend days in El Ávila National Park, eventually making it back to Caracas. Pérez then called for further protests, explaining that a "second phase" was to begin in collaboration with Venezuelans, telling them that they "are not alone" in the streets.

Colectivos attacking lawmakers

The day after Pérez reappeared from hiding, Venezuela's Independence Day, the National Assembly congregated on 5 July to commemorate the signing of the Venezuelan Declaration of Independence. Their event was interrupted by Vice President Tareck El Aissami, who led government supporters to the Palacio Federal Legislativo. El Aissami made a fifteen-minute speech calling for more supporters to arrive, stating they needed "to forge independence in the streets", leaving shortly thereafter.

Hundreds of government supporters and colectivos arrived in the succeeding hours, storming the Federal Legislative Palace after the National Guard opened the facility. Pro-government individuals then attacked opposition lawmakers with pipes, firearms and fireworks, leaving at least 12 injured, with the National Guard refusing to intervene in the violence.

== Reaction ==
The mysterious helicopter became a symbol of hope ... That something was at last happening. Unfortunately, once the dust settled and the farce was exposed, it became quite clear that the status quo prevailed. Nothing, in the end, had really changed for Venezuela.

— Andrés Miguel Rondón in The Atlantic

President Maduro stated that a military rebellion had occurred and called the incident a "terrorist attack". Opposition officials said that the actions were staged so Maduro could justify a crackdown on those who oppose his government and the constituent assembly. Others described the events as a "Reichstag fire" incident, comparing it to the situation which helped establish the Nazi party in Germany. Venezuelans were especially concerned with why the country's air force and its military's 5,000 Russian-made Igla-S MANPADS weapons – the largest stockpile in Latin America – were not deployed during the incident.

Control Ciudadano, a Venezuelan NGO, stated that it made no sense that an aircraft taking off from a military base had not been intercepted after abandoning its flight plan. The NGO also noted that the Venezuelan armed forces had the responsibility for pursuing the helicopter after it had flown across Caracas and left the area.

Representatives from Brazil, Colombia, Cuba, Ecuador, Mexico, and the United States issued statements about the incident, condemning the perpetrators of the incident, the government actions, or the general atmosphere of violence and disorder.

== See also ==
- 2018 Caracas drone attack
- List of attacks on high courts
