= 2017 Venezuelan referendum =

Referendum concerning the Venezuelan National Assembly

- 16 July 2017

Do you reject the Constitutional Assembly without a referendum?
Yes	99.87%
No	0.13%

Do you demand the Armed Forces to support the 1999 constitution and the National Assembly?
Yes	99.82%
No	0.18%

Do you demand immediate general elections and a Government of National Unity?
Yes	99.84%
No	0.16%

A referendum was held in Venezuela on 16 July 2017. The referendum was called by the National Assembly in response to the constitutional crisis and President Nicolás Maduro's plans for a Constituent Assembly. The referendum was an act of civil disobedience in the context of the application of Articles 333 and 350 of the Venezuelan constitution, with the articles calling for Venezuelans to "disown any regime ... that violates democratic values", especially since the National Electoral Council and the Supreme Tribunal of Justice were not recognized in the referendum. The opposition Democratic Unity Roundtable (MUD) announced that there would be 2,030 areas for the popular consultation nationwide to serve more than 19 million voters.

== Background ==
=== Constitutional crisis ===
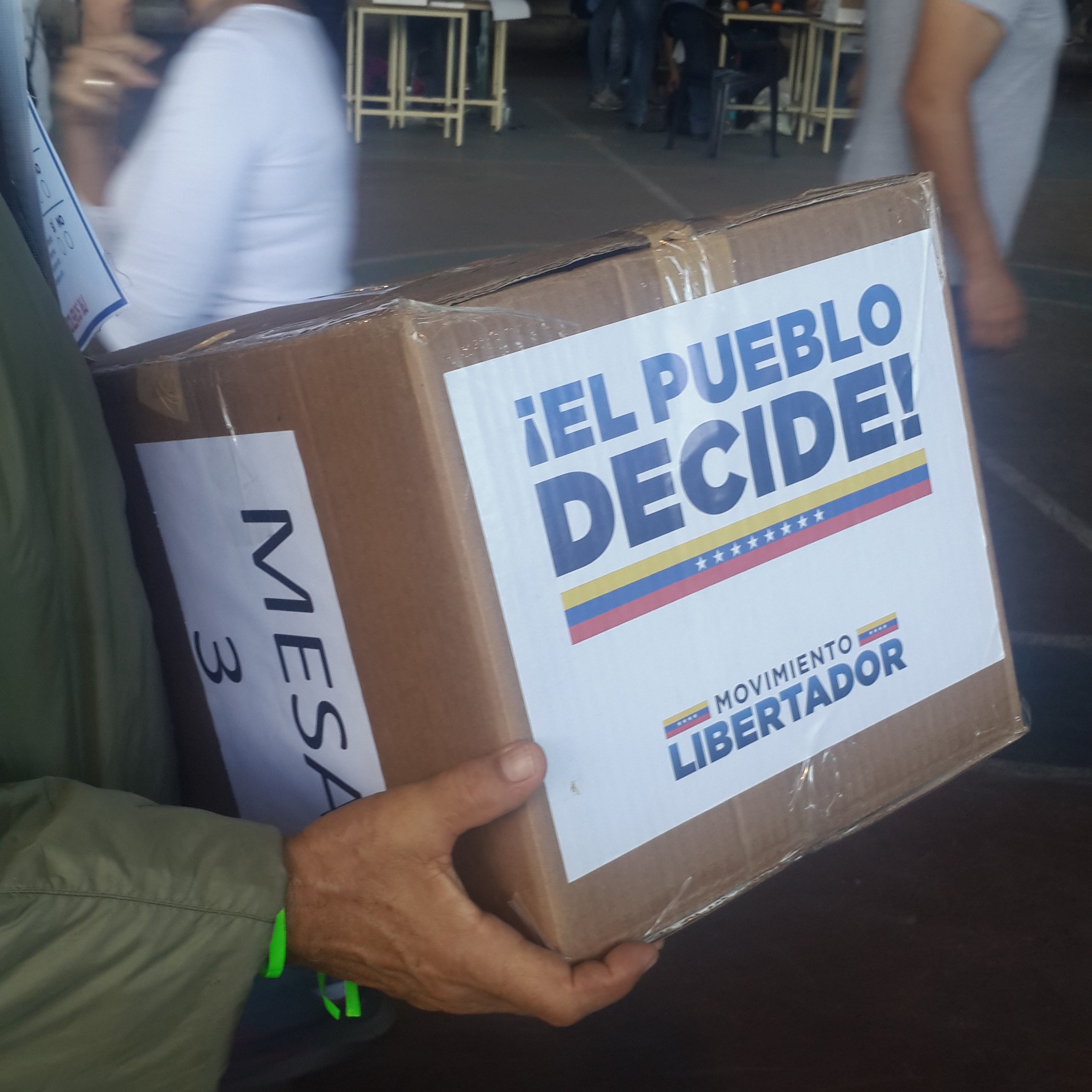
Ballot box of a voting center

On 29 March 2017, the government-filled Supreme Tribunal of Justice (TSJ) attempted to assume the powers of the opposition-led National Assembly, though the TSJ later reversed their decision. Despite this, protests in the country strengthened to an intensity not seen since the 2014 Venezuelan protests.

As protests intensified with nearly 30 killed in clashes in one month, President Maduro called for a Constitutional Assembly to draft a new constitution on 1 May 2017, sparking more outrage among Venezuelans. Protesting occurred for nearly 100 days before the opposition announced the unofficial referendum.

=== Planning ===
The National Assembly unanimously approved the plebiscite on 5 July 2017 based on Articles 5, 70 and 71 of the constitution. The National Commission of Telecommunications banned the media from calling the referendum a "popular consultation"; a move that was described as "arbitrary and illegal" by the National College of Journalists.

==== Questions ====
On 6 July the Unity Roundtable announced the 3 questions that will be asked in the National Consultation, according to what is established by the opposition alliance, Venezuelans should answer three questions with "Yes" or "No", with The intention that the results are the first step for a change of political system in Venezuela. The questions would be:

1. Do you reject and ignore the realization of a Constituent Assembly proposed by Nicolás Maduro without the prior approval of the Venezuelan people?
2. Do you demand the National Armed Forces and all public officials to obey and defend the Constitution of 1999 and support the decisions of the National Assembly?
3. Do you approve the renewal of public powers in accordance with the provisions of the Constitution, and the holding of free and transparent elections, as well as the formation of a Government of National Unity to restore constitutional order?

In the electoral process, all Venezuelans over the age of 18 enrolled or not enrolled in the CNE, inside and outside Venezuela, may participate. The committee formed for the development of the event, called "Rescue for Democracy", would work on the logistics and security of this activity.

== Opinion polls ==
=== Referendum ===
Date(s) conducted	Polling organization	Sample size	Intend to vote	Will not vote	Undecided
6–11 July	Hercon	1,200	55.5%	28.4%	16.0%
9 July	Datincorp	1,199	52%	31%	17%

=== Constituent Assembly ===
Graphical summary

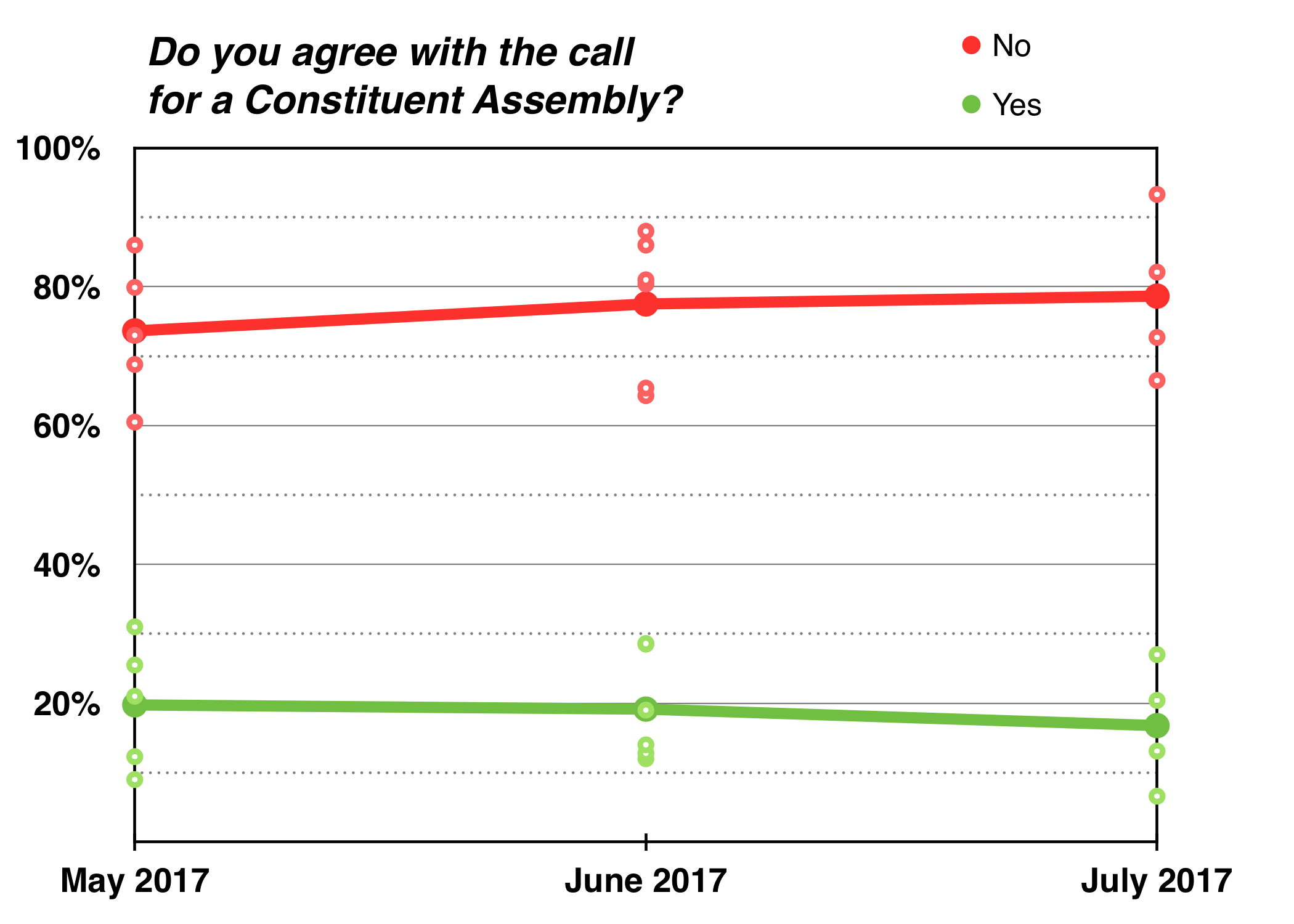
The red line represents percentage that say "No" to a Constitutional Assembly. The green line represents percentage that say "Yes" to a Constitutional Assembly. Dots are individual results of the polls seen below.

An 8 May poll found that 73% of Venezuelans disagreed with Maduro's Constitutional Assembly, with 79% believing that they live in some form of dictatorship (49% believe absolute dictatorship, 30% believe it is a mix of a dictatorship and democracy). According to a May 2017 poll by More Consulting, 68.8% of the Venezuelans reject the proposal, and 72.9% (with more than 20% who consider themselves chavistas) consider the government a dictatorship. A poll taken by Hercon between 10–25 May 2017 found that 78.1% wanted Maduro out of office in 2017, 79.9% did not agree with the Constitutional Assembly, 73.3% believed the CNE favored the ruling party (PSUV) and 75.5% thought that President Maduro started the Constitutional Assembly proposal to establish a government similar to Cuba's.

Date(s) conducted	Polling organization	Sample size	Approve of Maduro's plan for a Constitutional Assembly	Disapprove of Maduro's plan for a Constitutional Assembly	Undecided	Lead
6–11 July	Hercon	1,200	13.1%	82.1%	4.7%	69.0%
28 June	Hinterlaces	1,580	54%	44%	2%	10%
14 June	Meganálisis	–	12.8%	80.4%	6.7%	67.6%
29 May–4 June	Datanalisis	320	27.0%	69.1%	3.9%	42.1%
10–25 May	Hercon	1,200	12.3%	79.9%	7.7%	67.6%
10–17 May	UCV	1,200	9%	86%	5%	77%
8 May	Datincorp	1,199	21%	73%	5%	52%
5 May	MORE Consulting	1,000	25.5%	68.8%	5%	43.3%

== Conduct ==
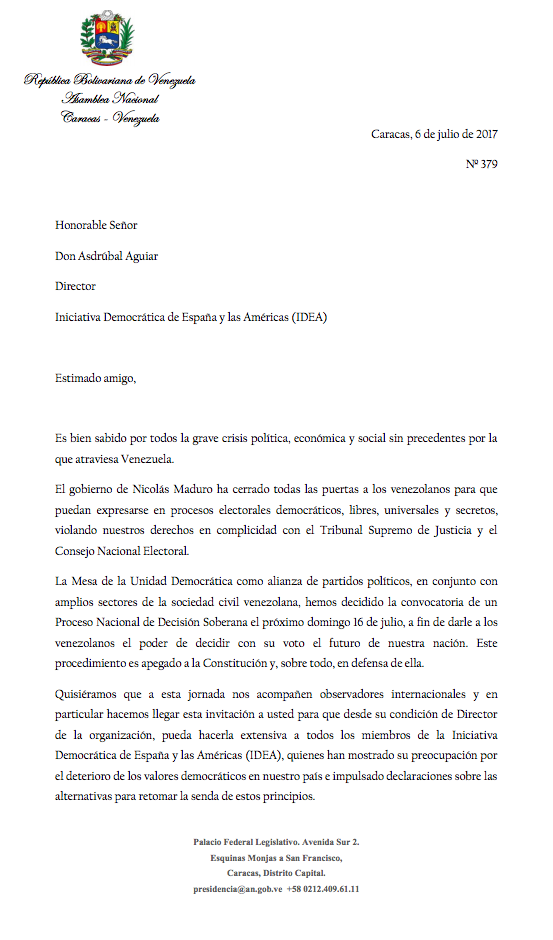
National Assembly Speaker Julio Borges inviting a commission of former presidents

President of the National Assembly, Julio Borges, invited several former presidents as observers for the popular consultation. The Democratic Initiative of Spain and the Americas (IDEA) reported that it will send a commission consisting of five former presidents: Laura Chinchilla from Costa Rica, Vicente Fox from Mexico, Andrés Pastrana from Colombia, Jorge Quiroga from Bolivia and Miguel Ángel Rodríguez of Costa Rica, in response to the invitation. The Assembly also invited "more than 12 personalities and parliamentarians from other countries".

The process was assisted by organizations such as Súmate, EsData, Voto Joven and Foro Penal Venezolano. Invitations have been made to international organizations to attend as witnesses, but it is unknown whether they were able to attend.

In the morning as voting began, colectivos broke into the voting center of the San Agustín parish in western Caracas, destroyed the notebooks that already had over three hundred signatures and stole an electoral ballot box. The center was moved to Parque Carabobo to continue with the voting.

Colectivos and Venezuelan authorities loyal to the Bolivarian government had also fired guns upon a large congregation of voters and dispersed a center in the usually pro-government neighborhood of Catia. The shooting in Catia left two dead and four seriously injured from gunshot wounds.

As polls closed at 4:00pm VST, President Maduro appeared on state television and made no mention of the Catia incident, instead blaming the opposition for any violence the country is facing. A "rehearsal" of the 30 July constitutional vote held on the same day resulted in a smaller number of participants. State media also portrayed the rehearsal as having a "high turnout", despite conventional press noting its low turnout and that Maduro did not appear in public as planned.

The following day, National Guard General Antonio Benavides Torres, the Chief of Government of the Capital District who is under investigation for human rights violations, stated that the opposition was responsible for the violence in Catia and that the referendum had very low turnout, saying that at opposition voting centers, "there were barely 50 people". On 18 July, President Maduro suggested that the United States was responsible for the violence in Catia.

== Results ==
Of the 19.5 million registered Venezuelan voters, approximately 7.5 million people participated in the referendum, including 690,000 Venezuelans from abroad. Low turnout was attributed to less voting areas than official elections, with about 2,000 voting areas in Venezuela and 500 foreign cities with centers.

=== Question 1 ===
Do you reject and ignore the realization of a Constituent Assembly proposed by Nicolás Maduro without the prior approval of the Venezuelan people?
Choice	Votes	%
For	7,432,764	99.88
Against	9,078	0.12
Total	7,441,842	100.00
Valid votes	7,441,842	98.76
Invalid/blank votes	93,447	1.24
Total votes	7,535,289	100.00
Registered voters/turnout	19,477,387	38.69
Source: MUD (99.01% counted)

99.87%	0.13%
Yes	No

=== Question 2 ===
Do you demand the National Armed Forces and all public officials to obey and defend the Constitution of 1999 and support the decisions of the National Assembly?
Choice	Votes	%
For	7,446,381	99.87
Against	9,835	0.13
Total	7,456,216	100.00
Valid votes	7,456,216	98.95
Invalid/blank votes	79,073	1.05
Total votes	7,535,289	100.00
Registered voters/turnout	19,477,387	38.69
Source: MUD (99.01% counted)

99.835%	0.18%
Yes	No

=== Question 3 ===
Do you approve the renewal of public powers in accordance with the provisions of the Constitution, and the holding of free and transparent elections, as well as the formation of a Government of National Unity to restore constitutional order?
Choice	Votes	%
For	7,454,703	99.85
Against	11,348	0.15
Total	7,466,051	100.00
Valid votes	7,466,051	99.08
Invalid/blank votes	69,238	0.92
Total votes	7,535,289	100.00
Registered voters/turnout	19,477,387	38.69
Source: MUD (99.01% counted)

99.86%	0.14%
Yes	No

== Reactions ==
=== Governments ===
The governments of Brazil, Canada, Costa Rica, Germany, Mexico and the United States called for the cancellation of the Bolivarian government's proposed Constitutional Assembly and condemned the violence at poll centers in Venezuela performed by colectivos. Bolivian president Evo Morales rejected the referendum convened by the Venezuelan opposition and accused former Latin American presidents to participate as observers of said process of being "conspirators" of a plot of orchestrated "coup" against Nicolás Maduro.

The Venezuelan government declared the five former Latin American leaders that participated as international observers to the referendum as persona non grata. Former Mexican President Vicente Fox was banned on July 16. Former President of Colombia Andrés Pastrana, former President of Bolivia Jorge Quiroga and former Presidents of Costa Rica Laura Chinchilla and Miguel Ángel Rodríguez were banned on July 18. Foreign Minister Samuel Moncada said the Latin American leaders invited as observers were "political sicarios", "clowns" and "mercenaries" that "sell themselves to the highest bidder to go to various destinations and repeat what they are told"

=== Supranational bodies ===
The United Nations called on the Venezuelan government to respect the National Assembly's election as well as the will of the people. The European Union demanded the cancellation of Maduro's Constitutional Assembly following the referendum.
