= Óscar Alberto Pérez =

Venezuelan police officer and rebel leader (1981–2018)

Óscar Pérez
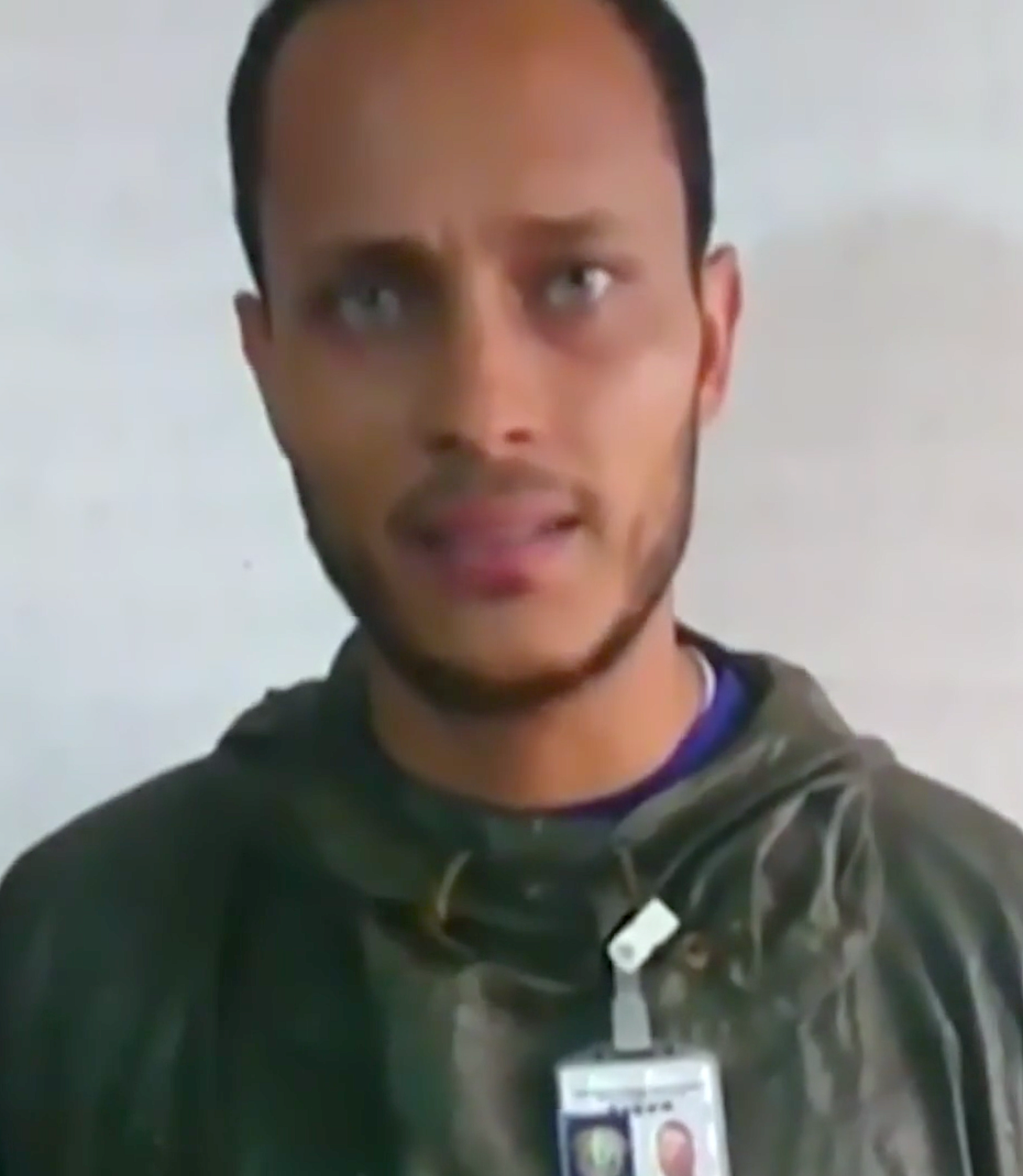
- Born: Óscar Alberto Pérez; 7 April 1981; Caracas, Venezuela
- Died: 15 January 2018 (aged 36); Caracas, Venezuela
- Cause of death: Gunshots to the head
- Burial place: Eastern Cemetery, El Hatillo Municipality, Venezuela; 10.443056°N 66.815833°W
- Occupations: Criminal Investigator, actor, rebel leader, pilot, commando, K9 trainer, diver and tactical paratrooper.
- Employer: Cuerpo de Investigaciones Científicas, Penales y Criminalísticas (CICPC)
- Known for: Responsible for the 2017 Caracas helicopter attack

Óscar Alberto Pérez (7 April 1981 – 15 January 2018) was a Venezuelan investigator for the CICPC, Venezuela's investigative agency. He was also an actor in a film to promote the role of detectives in the CICPC. He is better known for being responsible for the Caracas helicopter incident during the 2017 Venezuelan protests and the 2017 Venezuelan constitutional crisis. His killing in the El Junquito raid received worldwide attention by the media and the political establishment, and was met with accusations of extrajudicial killing.

== Early life ==
Óscar Pérez was born in 1981 and lived most of his childhood and teenage years in the suburbs of Caracas in a middle-class neighborhood. Óscar Pérez' mother is Aminta Rosa Pérez, a former government employee.

== Career ==
Pérez began his law enforcement career in 2000. He mainly served as an investigator for Cuerpo de Investigaciones Científicas, Penales y Criminalísticas (CICPC), Venezuela's criminal investigations and forensic services organization. He later became a member of the Brigada de Acciones Especiales (BAE), being a highly trained weapon specialist and the chief of helicopter operations for CICPC. He would often demonstrate his weapon skills on social media.

Following a 2012 raid while working for CICPC, Pérez was asked by a 10-year-old boy if his guns were real. When he asked the boy what they wanted to be when they grew up, the child replied "I want to be a pran because I will have a lot of money, nice women and the respect of the whole neighborhood". Following this encounter he decided to make a change in Venezuela, raising awareness and partaking in various charities with his foundation GV33 Moral y Luces.

I'm a helicopter pilot, combat diver and free parachutist. I am also a father, partner and actor ... I am a man who goes out without knowing if he is going back home because death is part of evolution.

— Óscar Alberto Pérez

Pérez would later approach Venezuelan filmmaker Óscar Rivas about creating a movie to improve values among those in Venezuela's law enforcement agencies. In 2015, Muerte Suspendida was released to the public, with Pérez serving as a protagonist, CICPC agent Efraín Robles, while also co-producing the film with information and equipment provided by CICPC. Pérez stated that he accepted the role because he believed in justice for Venezuela and that he wanted "people to fall in love with police work in Venezuela and to feel proud". Rivas stated that Pérez "was born with a goal in life, which is to support people in need. He always did positive things. ... He made several short films to raise awareness ... to recover the values that are lost in our country. This is the work that Óscar has been doing". After Muerte Suspendida became Venezuela's second-highest-grossing movie in 2015, a second movie was going to be created, though there were not enough resources in the country.

== Rebellion movement ==
=== 2017 Caracas helicopter attack ===
There was no collateral damage because it was planned and because we are not murderers like you, Mr. Nicolás Maduro, as well as you, Diosdado Cabello, they mourn every day in Venezuelan homes.

— Óscar Pérez

For years, Venezuela has suffered from a political and economic crisis following the presidency of Hugo Chávez and his successor Nicolás Maduro. While working as a law enforcement agent, Pérez stated that he witnessed deep levels of corruption within the Bolivarian government's structure, experiencing the collaboration between state authorities and pro-government gangs known as colectivos in acts of theft and extortion while also observing the movement of cocaine by government officials with full impunity, singling out Néstor Reverol as an official who hampered his investigations into the matters.

Pérez expressed in interviews how he had thought about incorporating his helicopter skills in a protest for some time. Finally in mid-June 2017, Pérez's brother was murdered near Carabobo Park in Caracas. It was determined that his brother was stabbed to death for the theft of his cell phone. On the afternoon of 27 June 2017, a video was released showing men with assault rifles flanking Óscar Pérez, stating that "We are nationalists, patriots and institutionalists. This fight is not with the rest of the state forces, it is against the tyranny of this government".

Hours after the video was released, Pérez was seen piloting a CICPC helicopter over the Baruta Municipality. Non-lethal stun grenades were thrown from the helicopter onto the Supreme Tribunal of Justice building while blank firearm cartridges were fired near the Interior Ministry building to draw attention to his message; a banner on the helicopter read "350 Liberty", a reference to Article 350 of the constitution which states that "The people of Venezuela… shall disown any regime, legislation or authority that violates democratic values, principles and guarantees or encroaches upon human rights". Pérez later explained his actions, saying:

It was meant as a wake-up call that they shouldn’t lose hope ... And not just to the people but also to the public workers that they wake up as well.

President Maduro claimed that a military rebellion had occurred while opposition officials said that the actions were staged so Maduro could justify a crackdown on those who oppose his government and the constituent assembly.

=== Public appearances ===
Following the helicopter attack, Pérez made several public appearances to encourage Venezuelans to rebel against the Bolivarian government.

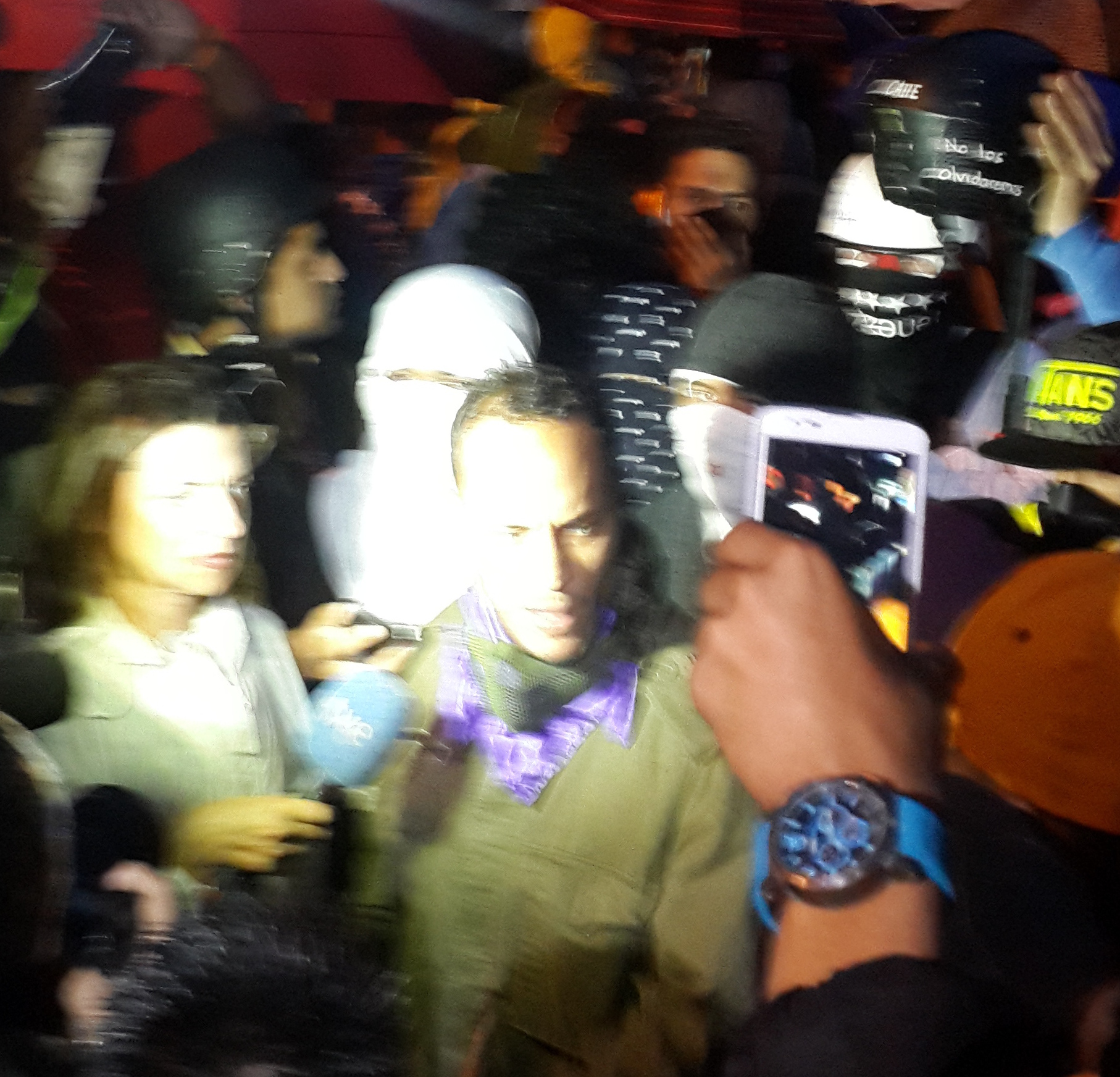
Pérez at an opposition march in Altamira on 13 July 2017

On 7 July 2017, Venezuelan authorities arrested three citizens on Caracas' streets who were allegedly linked to Pérez. A week later on 13 July, Pérez appeared at a protest in Altamira, denouncing colectivo confrontations with the National Assembly and stating that the Bolivarian government knew who was responsible for the attacks. He also shared his support for the Venezuelan National Consultation, 2017 and stated that he would continue his plans, explaining that a "Zero Hour" is to occur on 18 July while calling for all Venezuelans to protest that day to a point of no return, saying "it's time for this narco-government to collapse".

On 23 November 2017 Pérez appeared on an internet video. He sat beside a man who criticized the corruption of the Bolivarian government. As the video concluded, Pérez shared his only words, calling for renewed protests by the Venezuelan people, stating "the generals without troops are nobody".

=== National Guard barracks operation ===
On 18 December, Óscar Pérez successfully implemented "Operation Genesis", which resulted in the theft of 26 rifles and 3 automatic pistols from a command station of the National Guard in Los Teques, Miranda state. The surprise attack resulted in no deaths, with Pérez and about 50 other rebels gagging and tying up the National Guardsmen, ridiculing them for supporting the Bolivarian government, asking "Why do you continue to defend drug traffickers, some real terrorists? …Be worthy of the uniform you are wearing, you are irresponsible, traitors to the country for not doing something". The group then destroyed images of President Maduro and Hugo Chávez, Maduro's predecessor.

President Maduro responded, stating "Wherever they appear, I have ordered the Armed Forces, 'Lead for the terrorist groups! Lead them, compadre!' …zero tolerance with terrorist groups that threaten with weapons the peace of the Republic."

== Death ==
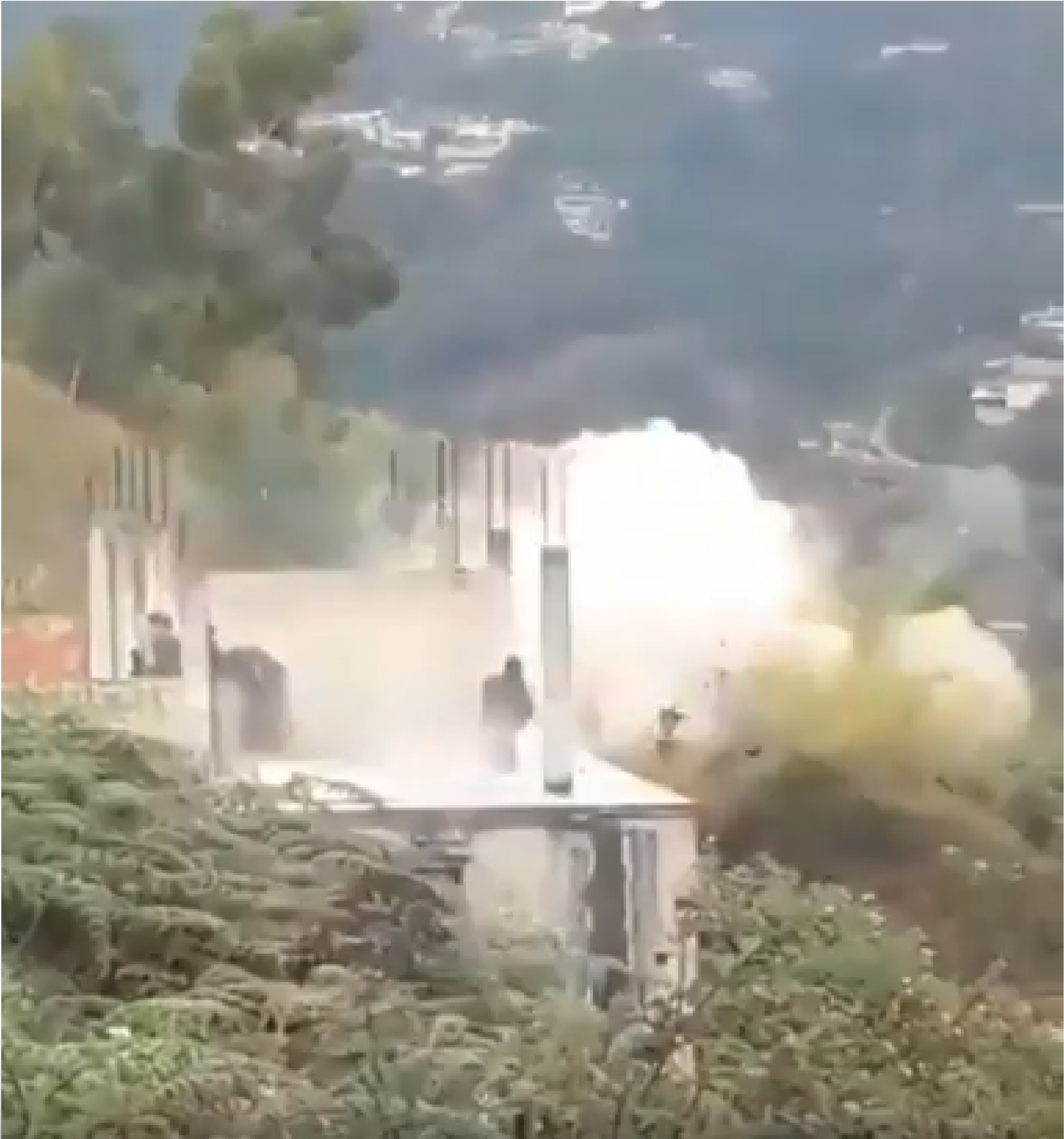
Government forces firing an RPG at Pérez's hideout

External videos
- Venezuela Attack: Pilot Oscar Pérez Last Known Footage on YouTube

On 15 January 2018, the Venezuelan army and the Venezuelan National Guard launched an operation after learning the whereabouts of Óscar Pérez, who was held up in the El Junquito parish in Caracas. Pérez and his team initially stated they would not surrender in defense of the family in the home, fearing that the family in the home would be killed by authorities. Once he realized that he and his outfit were surrounded, Pérez attempted to surrender in order to spare the lives of the rebels as well as the family. He then posted a video on the internet showing his face covered in blood stating that the police began attacking his group with snipers, grenades, grenade launchers and rocket-propelled grenades, with Pérez and others saying that authorities were only there on orders to kill them. During the raid, Pérez contacted several people on his phone, calling his former boss at CICPC pleading that he send staff of the attorney general and the media to provide coverage of the raid and to grant him a route for a safe surrender. In one of his final videos, Pérez recognizes that he would not survive the attack, leaving the message "May God be with us and may Jesus Christ accompany me ... I love you with all my heart, sons. I hope to see you soon again". Finally, a rocket-propelled grenade was fired into the home. After three hours of shooting, Pérez and five of his men (Daniel Enrique Soto Torres, Abraham Lugo Ramos, Jairo Lugo Ramos, José Alejandro Díaz Pimentel, Abraham Israel Agostini) were shot dead while six others were arrested; the police also suffered losses, with two officers killed and five injured. His death was confirmed by the Venezuelan police one day later. A pregnant woman and a child were also killed during the raid.

Pérez was then brought to the same morgue where he had to identify his dead brother and where his call to action began, with observers reporting three bullet wounds to his head. His body was later buried nude wrapped in a single white sheet by the Bolivarian government on 21 January 2018 after the release of his body to his family was denied, with only two family members present under the watch of state authorities. Death certificates later released to the families of the rebels showed the same cause of death for each; bullet wounds to the head.

=== Aftermath ===
His killing was met with outrage from the opposition and accusations of extrajudicial killing. The hashtag "#Oscarperezheroedelpueblo" became a worldwide trending topic on Twitter, with many people regarding Pérez as a hero. The Miami Herald stated that information surrounding the death of Pérez and his followers acknowledged the "widespread speculation that the rebels were victims of extrajudicial executions" and that their sources "illustrate a chain of events different from that provided" by the Venezuelan government.

Venezuelan president Nicolás Maduro applauded the operation, describing it as being an "order fulfilled" and said that "every group that is armed and financed to bring terrorism will suffer the same fate". Luisa Ortega Díaz and leading opposition figures, including Maria Corina Machado and Antonio Ledezma, condemned his killing.

US Senator Marco Rubio (R) condemned the operation against former policeman Óscar Pérez and his rebel team. According to Rubio: "Venezuela has a Constitution with which it must comply, obviously covering up these events, it seems that these individuals were going to surrender (...) They have killed someone who was willing to surrender peacefully after a confrontation." The former US Ambassador to Venezuela Otto Reich also regretted the fact and indicated that the current situation in Venezuela is very similar to that of Cuba, for him, "The government of Cuba handled the repression in Venezuela, tried to also manage the economy, but that's like a blind man trying to guide another blind man. (...) And now what they are doing is helping the Maduro government to kill the Venezuelans."

Twenty ex-presidents of Latin America and Spain harshly criticized the Maduro government's actions. They wrote on "Iniciativa Democrática de España y las Américas (IDEA)" a message of denunciation. The underwriters were: Óscar Arias, Rafael Ángel Calderón, Laura Chinchilla and Miguel Ángel Rodríguez from Costa Rica; José María Aznar, from Spain, Nicolás Ardito Barletta and Mireya Moscoso, from Panama; Belisario Betancur, Andrés Pastrana, César Gaviria and Álvaro Uribe, from Colombia; Felipe Calderón and Vicente Fox, from Mexico; Alfredo Cristiani, from El Salvador; Fernando de la Rúa, from Argentina; Lucio Gutiérrez, Jamil Mahuad and Osvaldo Hurtado, from Ecuador; Luis Alberto Lacalle and Julio María Sanguinetti, from Uruguay; Jorge Tuto Quiroga, from Bolivia; and Juan Carlos Wasmosy from Paraguay.

Amnesty International (AI), a non-governmental organization (NGO) that defends human rights, denounced on 18 January 2018 what it considered an illegal execution of rebel Óscar Pérez in Venezuela by government security forces. According to the organization, the episode raises multiple alarms about serious violations of human rights in the country of President Nicolás Maduro, including crimes prohibited by international law. According to AI's note: "In the operation, officials used a military weapon that is not only designed to kill, but also leaves little chance of survival, and the use of this weapon endangered the lives of people around." The NGO also called for an urgent investigation into Pérez's death. According to Erika Guevara Rosas, Director for the Americas of AI: "It is urgent that the Venezuelan government guarantee that the civil authorities conduct an immediate, impartial, independent and exhaustive investigation into the intentionally lethal use of force in this operation, and demonstrate that this was not the first time that the Venezuelan authorities justify the lethal use of force, simply based on allegations of 'criminal activities', leaving aside the rule of law."

Human Rights Watch compared the Óscar Pérez case in Venezuela with the massacres of other Latin American dictatorships. The director of the organization for Latin America, José Miguel Vivanco, said that what happened in El Junquito reminds him that "during the dictatorships in Argentina and Chile, news about terrorists killed in confrontations frequently appeared and often it was about executions." According to the official note, Human Rights Watch "condemns the operation intended to extrajudicially execute Óscar Pérez, (...) the operation would have caused the death of about nine people, at least five of whom would be members of the group of Pérez, and two would be a pregnant woman and a 10-year-old boy accompanying the group of rebels."

== Filmography ==
- 2015: Muerte Suspendida
