= El Junquito raid =

2018 police raid in Caracas, Venezuela, to capture Óscar Pérez

- Part of the Crisis in Venezuela
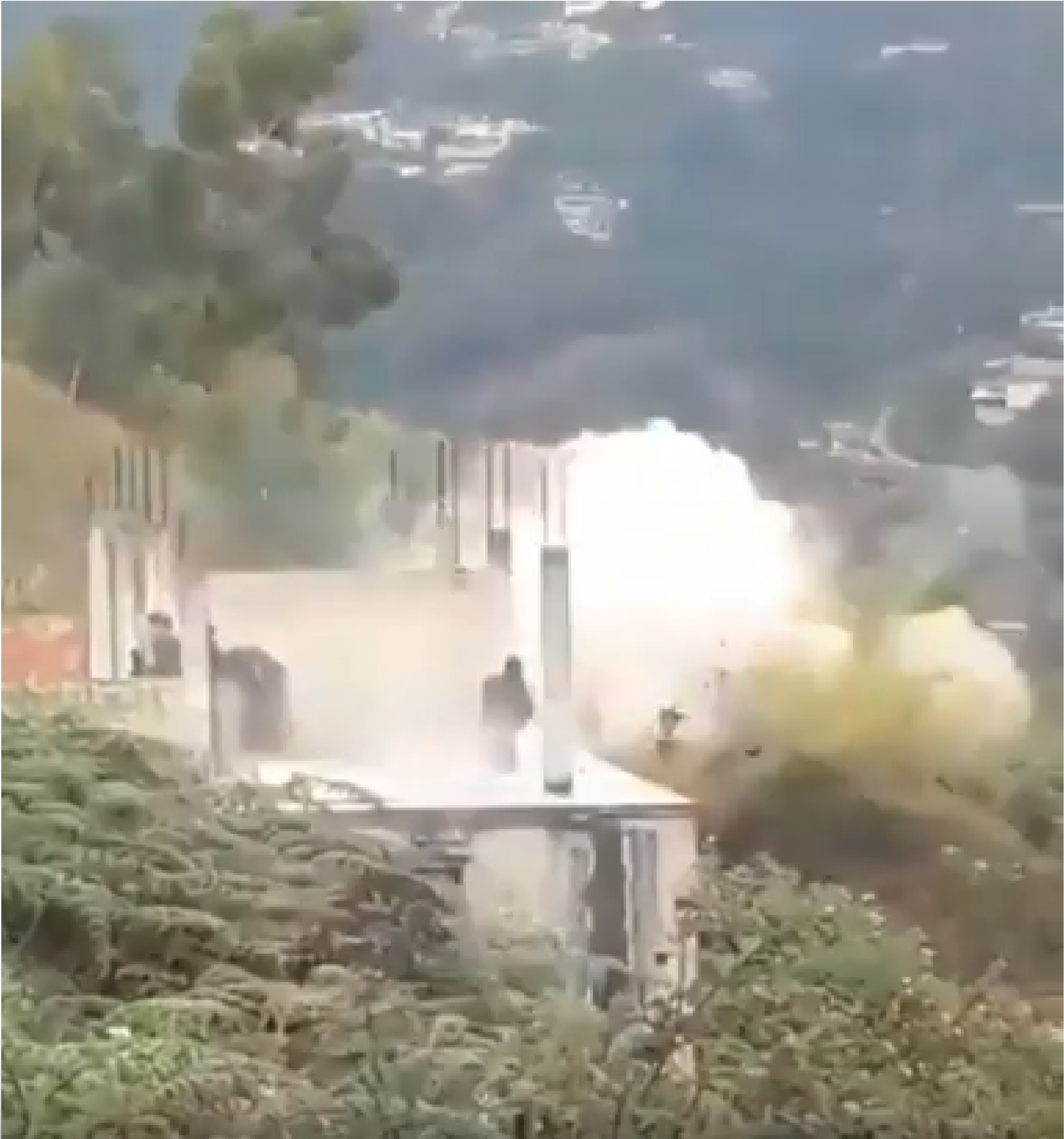
- Government forces fire a rocket launcher at Óscar Pérez's hideout
Date	15 January 2018
Location	El Junquito, Capital District, Venezuela
Result	Government victory: Death of Óscar Alberto Pérez and others

Belligerents
Government of Venezuela: Venezuelan Army; Venezuelan National Guard; SEBIN; Bolivarian National Police	Venezuelan rebels

Commanders and leaders
Nicolás Maduro; Néstor Reverol; Vladimir Padrino López	Óscar Alberto Pérez †

Strength
≈500	13

Casualties and losses
3 dead, 8 injured	7 dead, 6 arrested

The El Junquito raid (codenamed Operation Gideon) was a police and military raid that occurred on 15 January 2018 in El Junquito, Capital District, Venezuela, which resulted in the death of rebel Óscar Alberto Pérez and members of his movement.

== Background ==
=== 2017 Caracas helicopter attack ===
For years, Venezuela has suffered from a political and economic crisis following the presidency of Hugo Chávez and his successor Nicolás Maduro. Óscar Alberto Pérez has stated that, while working as a law enforcement agent, he witnessed deep levels of corruption within the Bolivarian government's structure, experiencing the collaboration between state authorities and pro-government gangs known as the colectivos in acts of theft and extortion while also observing the movement of cocaine by government officials with impunity. He singled out Néstor Reverol as an official who hampered his investigations into the matters.

Pérez expressed in interviews how he had thought about incorporating his helicopter skills in a protest for some time. Finally in mid-June 2017, Pérez's brother was murdered near Carabobo Park in Caracas. It was determined that his brother was stabbed to death while being robbed of his cell phone.

Weeks later on the afternoon of 27 June 2017, a video was released showing men with assault rifles flanking Pérez, stating that "We are nationalists, patriots and institutionalists. This fight is not with the rest of the state forces, it is against the tyranny of this government".

Hours after the video was released, Pérez was seen piloting a CICPC helicopter over the Supreme Tribunal of Justice with a banner on the side reading "350 Liberty", a reference to Article 350 of the constitution which states that "The people of Venezuela ... shall disown any regime, legislation or authority that violates democratic values, principles and guarantees or encroaches upon human rights". While the helicopter was near the Supreme Court, gunfire was heard in the area. President Maduro stated that a military rebellion had occurred while opposition officials said that the actions were staged so Maduro could justify a crackdown on those who oppose his government and the constituent assembly.

=== National Guard barracks operation ===
On 18 December, Pérez successfully implemented "Operation Genesis", which resulted in the theft of 26 rifles and 3 automatic pistols from a command station of the National Guard in Los Teques, Miranda state. The surprise attack resulted in no deaths, with Pérez and about 50 other rebels gagging and tying up the National Guardsmen, ridiculing them for supporting the Bolivarian Government, asking "Why do you continue to defend drug traffickers, some real terrorists? ... Be worthy of the uniform you are wearing, you are irresponsible, traitors to the country for not doing something". The group then destroyed images of President Maduro and Hugo Chávez, Maduro's predecessor.

President Maduro responded, stating "Wherever they appear, I have ordered the Armed Forces, 'Lead for the terrorist groups! Lead them, compadre!' ... zero tolerance with terrorist groups that threaten with weapons the peace of the Republic."

== Operation ==
External videos
- Venezuela Attack: Pilot Oscar Pérez Last Known Footage on YouTube

On 15 January 2018, the Venezuelan Army and the Venezuelan National Guard launched an operation after discovering the location of Pérez, who was held up in the El Junquito parish of Capital District. Around 4:00 AM VST (8:00 AM UTC), about 500 troops were deployed to attack Pérez and his compatriots at their location. Around 6:45 AM VST (10:45 AM UTC), Pérez released video stating that his group had been fired upon, though he mentioned that negotiations were underway.

=== Siege ===
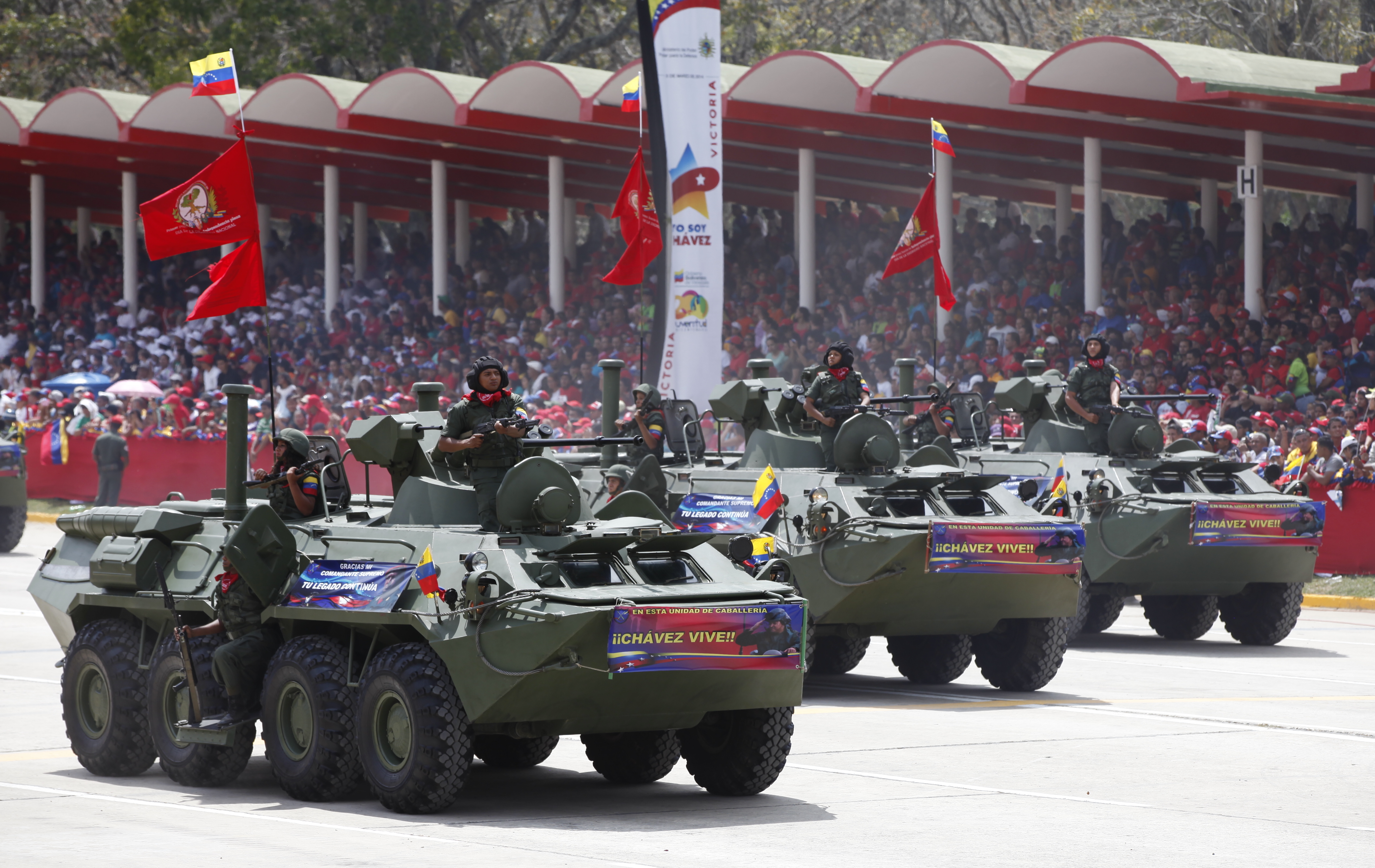
BTR-80As similar to the one used during the operation

By about 8:30 AM VST (12:30 PM UTC), a firefight between the two factions ensued. Pérez and his team initially resisted the attack, though once he realized they were surrounded, Pérez attempted to surrender in order to spare the lives of the rebels as well as the family living in the home. Around 9:07 AM VST (1:07 PM UTC), troops began to fire rocket-propelled grenades at the group's location. Pérez then posted a video on the internet showing his face covered in blood stating that the police had not stopped attacking his group with snipers, grenades, grenade launchers and rocket-propelled grenades, with Pérez and others saying that authorities were only there on orders to kill them.

During the raid, Pérez contacted several people on his phone, calling his former boss at CICPC pleading that he send staff of the attorney general and the media to provide coverage of the raid and to grant him a route for a safe surrender. Finally, a Russian-made BTR-80A was deployed to the area and arrived to the site around 11:45 VST (3:45 PM UTC), where it proceeded to fire at the rebel location.

=== End of siege ===
After hours of shooting, Pérez's group succumbed to the Venezuelan forces around 12:00 PM VST (4:00 PM UTC), with members of the group likely being executed by troops according to Bellingcat and Forensic Architecture. Pérez and five of his men (Daniel Enrique Soto Torres, Abraham Lugo Ramos, Jairo Lugo Ramos, José Alejandro Díaz Pimentel, Abraham Israel Agostini) were shot dead while six others were arrested. His death was confirmed by the Venezuelan Police one day later. Pérez was reportedly observed in the morgue with three bullet wounds to the head, with official death certificates showing a similar pattern of shots to the head among his fallen rebels. Two days later, it was revealed that a pregnant woman and a child were also killed during the raid.

The police and the colectivos also suffered losses, with two officers killed and five injured while one member of a colectivo from 23 de Enero was killed. The raid was described as highly unorganized, with Venezuelan troops being observed laughing and firing indiscriminately towards Pérez's, possibly causing friendly fire incidents. Bellingcat has reported a notorious lack of coordination and professionalism among Venezuelian police during the operation as leaked wiretapped recordings reveal.

Evidence was never revealed by the Venezuelan government and the home where the rebels were discovered was quickly destroyed.

In 2019, the Spanish newspaper ABC published pictures of the corpses of the rebels that suggested gunshots at point-blank range and extrajudicial killings.

== Reactions ==
=== Domestic ===
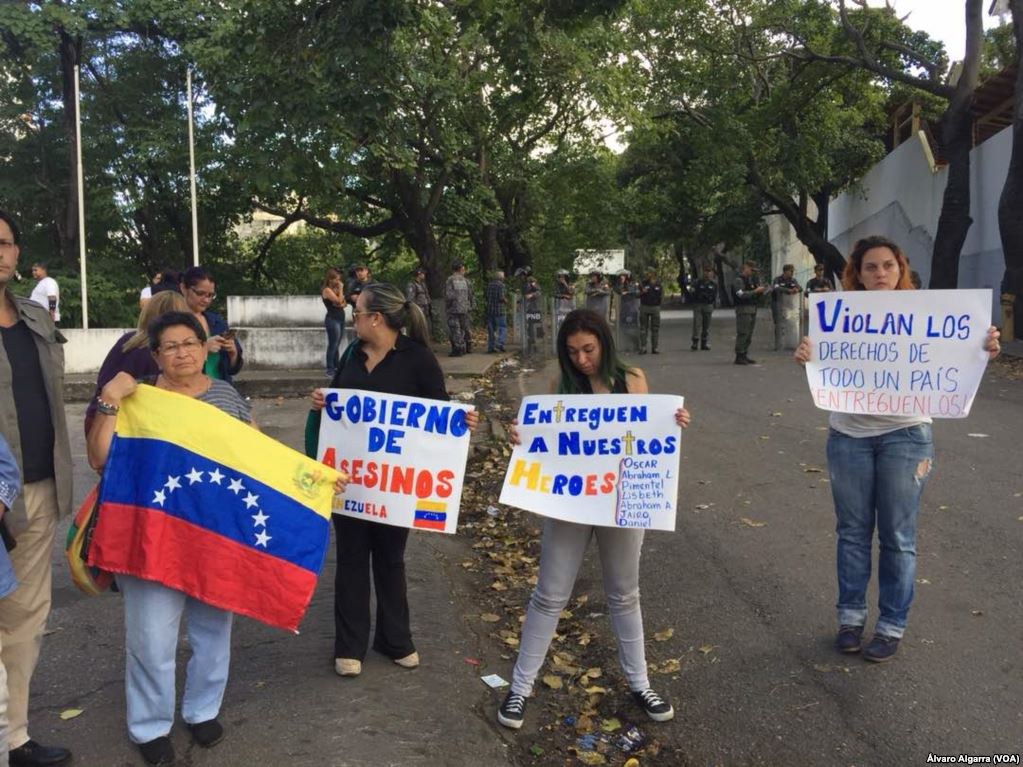
Opposition demonstrators protesting against the operation

The raid was met with outrage from the Venezuelan opposition and accusations of extrajudicial killing.

Venezuelan President Nicolás Maduro applauded the operation, describing it as being an "order fulfilled" and said that "every group that is armed and financed to bring terrorism will suffer the same fate". Some leading opposition figures including Maria Corina Machado, Antonio Ledezma and Luisa Ortega Díaz condemned his killing.

=== International ===
International organizations, in particular the Inter-American human rights system and the International Criminal Court, have investigated the allegations of an extrajudicial killing in El Junquito. The Inter-American Commission on Human Rights received the allegation as a petition filed by Foro Penal and the Robert & Ethel Kennedy Human Rights Center and referred the case to the Inter-American Court of Human Rights. The Court has been reviewing the case, which remains pending.

The international media and some politicians and citizens all over the world defined what has happened in El Junquito as a massacre and harshly criticized Maduro and his government.

Some of the countries were: Brazil, Colombia, with criticism from former President Andrés Pastrana, United States, with angry comments from Senator Marco Rubio, Guatemala, Paraguay, Uruguay, Spain, Bolivia's former president Jorge Quiroga, and France. Additionally, the main media in Italy (including Corriere della Sera, La Stampa, Repubblica, Il Giornale) reported the news of the "massacre" on the first page for a full week.

== See also ==
- Macuto Bay raid, also codenamed Operation Gideon
