= 2017 Venezuelan constitutional crisis =

Nicolás Maduro's political oppression on the opposition

- Part of the crisis in Venezuela
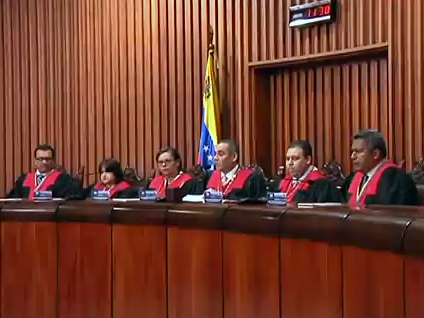
- The Supreme Tribunal of Justice (TSJ) meeting on 28 March 2017
- Date: 29 March 2017; 9 years ago
- Location: Venezuela
- Caused by: National Assembly is dissolved and stripped of legislative powers and parliamentary immunity.; Supreme Court assumes control of legislative powers.
- Result: Internal and international condemnation.; Supreme Court partially reverses decision after facing criticism.; Strengthening of 2017 Venezuelan protests; Maduro calls a Constituent Assembly to replace the 1999 Constitution of Venezuela; Beginning of the full dictatorship in Venezuela

Parties
Presidency; (Venezuela) Supreme Tribunal of Justice; Support: GPPSB; ( PSUV)	National Assembly; Support: MUD

Lead figures
Nicolás Maduro; Maikel Moreno; Diosdado Cabello	Julio Borges

On 29 March 2017, the Supreme Tribunal of Justice (TSJ) of Venezuela took over legislative powers of the National Assembly. The Tribunal, mainly supporters of President Nicolás Maduro, also restricted the immunity granted to the Assembly's members, who mostly belonged to the opposition.

The dissolution was considered by the opposition to be a "coup" while the Organization of American States (OAS) termed the action a "self-coup". The decision was condemned by some media outlets with analysts characterizing the move as a turn towards authoritarianism and one-man rule.

Politicians throughout the Americas, as well as leaders from the United Nations, condemned the decision and demanded its reversal, though the Venezuelan government stated no coup had taken place and instead justified its decision as a reaction to "coup-like actions" allegedly performed by the opposition.

On 1 April 2017, the TSJ partially reversed its decision, thereby reinstating the powers of the National Assembly. Public dissatisfaction with the decision persisted however, with the strengthening of the protests that year "into the most combative since a wave of unrest in 2014" resulting from the crisis.

== Background ==
Following the death of President Hugo Chávez, Venezuela faced a severe socioeconomic crisis during the presidency of his successor, President Nicolás Maduro, as a result of their policies. Due to the state's high levels of urban violence, inflation, and chronic shortages of basic goods attributed to economic policies such as strict price controls, civil insurrection in Venezuela culminated in the 2014–17 protests. Protests occurred over the years, with demonstrations occurring in various intensities depending on the crises Venezuelans were facing at the time and the perceived threat of being repressed by authorities.

The discontent with the United Socialist Government saw the opposition being elected to hold the majority in the National Assembly for the first time since 1999 following the 2015 Parliamentary Election. As a result of that election, the lame duck National Assembly consisting of United Socialist officials filled the Venezuelan Supreme Court with allies. Into early 2016, the Supreme Court alleged that voting irregularities occurred in the 2015 Parliamentary Elections and stripped four Assembly members of their seats, preventing an opposition supermajority in the National Assembly which would be able to challenge President Maduro. The Assembly nevertheless swore in 3 of the members in question, in response to which the Supreme Court ruled that the Assembly was in contempt of court and in violation of the constitutional order. The TSJ court then began to approve multiple actions performed by Maduro and granted him more powers.

After facing years of crisis, the Venezuelan opposition pursued a recall referendum against President Maduro, presenting a petition to the National Electoral Council (CNE) on 2 May 2016. By August 2016, the momentum to recall President Maduro appeared to be progressing, with the Council setting a date for the second phase of collecting signatures, though it made the schedule strenuous, stretching the process into 2017 which made it impossible for the opposition to activate new Presidential Elections. On 21 October 2016, the Council suspended the referendum only days before preliminary signature-gatherings were to be held. The Council blamed alleged voter fraud as the reason for the cancellation of the referendum. International observers criticized the move, stating that CNE's decision made Maduro look as if he were seeking to rule as a dictator.

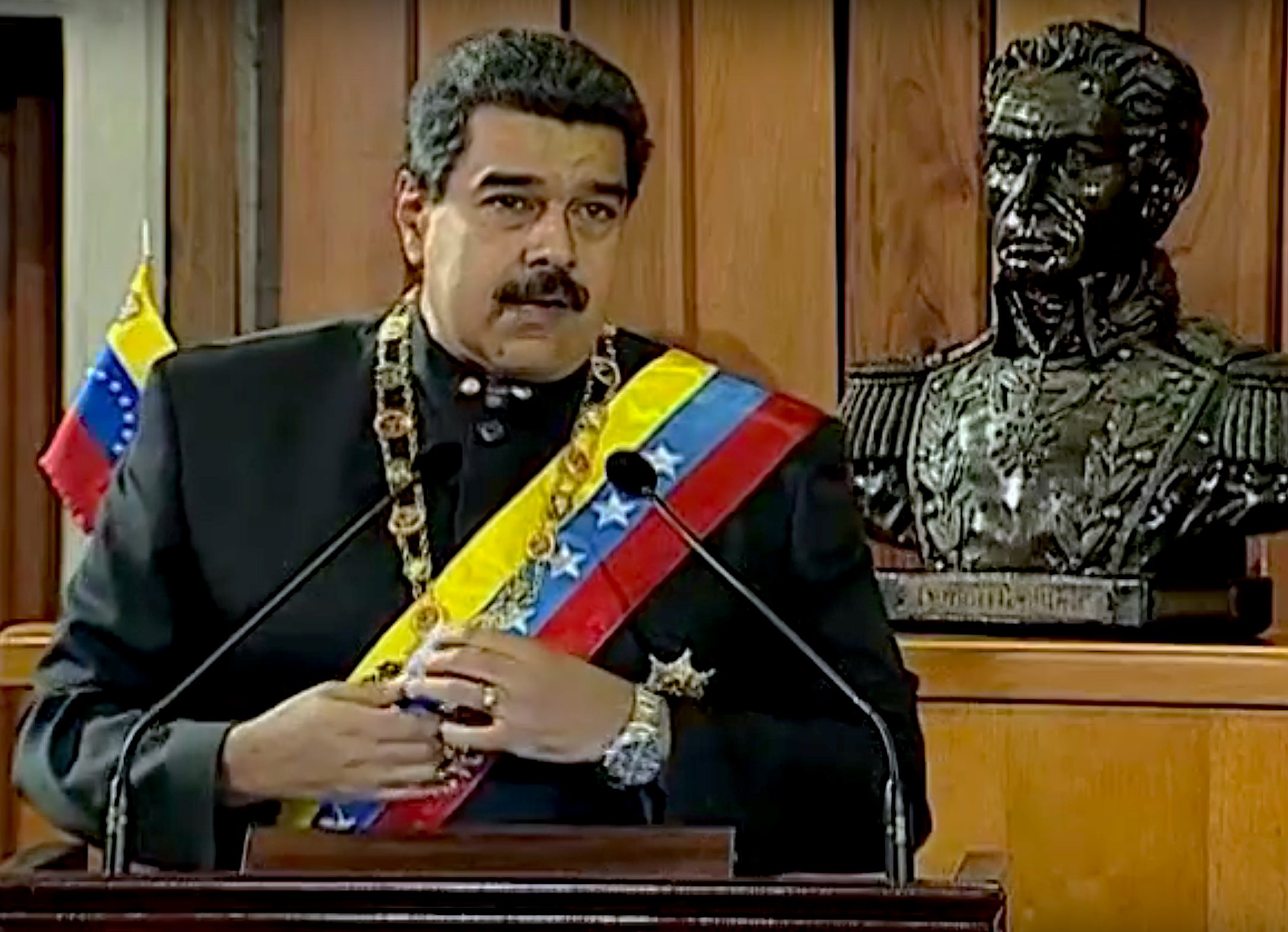
President Maduro speaking to the TSJ on 7 February 2017, asking for the establishment of an alliance of "the judiciary, the citizen and the executive" while saying the National Assembly was in contempt

Days after the recall movement was cancelled, 1.2 million Venezuelans protested throughout the country against the move, demanding President Maduro to leave office, with Caracas protests remaining calm while protests in other federal states resulted in clashes between demonstrators and authorities, leaving one policeman dead, 120 injured and 147 arrested. That day the opposition gave President Maduro a deadline of 3 November 2016 to hold elections, with opposition leader, Miranda Governor Henrique Capriles stating, "Today we are giving a deadline to the Government. I tell the coward who is in Miraflores ... that on 3 November the Venezuelan people are coming to Caracas because we are going to Miraflores".

Days later on 1 November 2016, then National Assembly President and opposition leader Henry Ramos Allup announced the cancellation of 3 November march to the Miraflores presidential palace, with Vatican-led dialogue between the opposition and the government beginning. By 7 December 2016, dialogue halted between the two and two months later on 13 January 2017 after talks stalled, the Vatican officially pulled out of the dialogue. Further protests were much smaller due to the fear of repression, with the opposition organizing surprise protests instead of organized mass marches.

Other actions by President Maduro and his Bolivarian officials included a 7 February 2017 meeting which announced the creation of the Great Socialist Justice Mission which had the goal of establishing "a great alliance between the three powers, the judiciary, the citizen and the executive", with Maduro stating that "we have been fortunate to see how the judicial power has been growing and perfecting, carrying a doctrine so complete with the constitution of 1999" while stating that the opposition-led National Assembly "took power not for the majority not for the people but for themselves".

== Events ==
=== Judicial events ===
The Court ruled that the National Assembly was "in a situation of contempt", because of the aforementioned rulings against the election of some of its members. It stripped the Assembly of legislative powers, and took those powers for itself; which meant that the Court might have been able to create laws. The court did not indicate if or when it might hand power back. A statement issued by the court however stated that it would retain the powers of the legislature until the "contempt situation persists and the National Assembly actions are invalidated". The action transferred powers from the Assembly, which had an opposition majority since January 2016, to the Supreme Tribunal of Justice, which has a majority of government loyalists. The ruling also granted President Maduro the power to suspend elections, imprison opposition deputies and withdraw Venezuela from the Organization of American States.

==== Ruling Nº 155 ====
The President of the Bolivarian Republic of Venezuela is ORDERED, in accordance with the provisions of Article 236.4, in accordance with the provisions of Articles 337 et seq. eiusdem (see Ruling Nº 113 of 20 March 2017), among others, to proceed to exercise such international measures as he deems appropriate and necessary to safeguard the constitutional order, and furthermore, in the exercise of its constitutional powers and in order to ensure the governability of the country, to take civil, economic, military, political, legal and social measures that he deems appropriate and necessary to avoid a state of commotion; and in the framework of the State of Exception and in the face of contempt and continued legislative omission by the National Assembly, to review exceptionally the substantive and procedural legislation (including the Organic Law against Organized Crime and Financing of Terrorism, the Anti-Corruption Law, the Criminal Code, the Organic Code of Criminal Procedure and the Code of Military Justice – since crimes of a military nature may be committed), that allows avoiding the serious risks that threaten the democratic stability, the peaceful coexistence and the rights of the Venezuelans and the Venezuelans; all in accordance with the letter and spirit of Articles 15, 18 and 21 of the Organic Law on States of Exceptions in force. — Supreme Tribunal of Justice, Ruling Nº 155

==== Ruling Nº 156 ====
On the basis of the declared unconstitutional omission, this Constitutional Chamber resolves that there is no impediment for the National Executive to establish joint ventures in the spirit established in Article 33 of the Organic Hydrocarbons Law, for which purpose the National Executive, by body of the Ministry of Energy and Petroleum, shall inform to this Chamber of all the pertinent circumstances to that constitution and conditions, including the special advantages envisaged in favor of the Republic. Any subsequent modification of the conditions shall be reported to this Chamber, following a favorable report from the Ministry of Energy and Petroleum.

Resolving the interpretation requested of Article 33 of the current Organic Hydrocarbons Law, the Chamber decides that the National Assembly, acting de facto, can not modify the proposed conditions or seek to establish other conditions.

On the basis of a state of emergency, the Head of State may amend the rule to be interpreted by means of a reform, in accordance with the jurisprudence of this High Court (see Ruling Nº 155 of 28 March 2017).

As long as the dissatisfaction and invalidity of the proceedings of the National Assembly persist, this Constitutional Chamber will ensure that the parliamentary powers are exercised directly by this Chamber or by the body that it has in place to ensure the rule of law. — Supreme Tribunal of Justice, Ruling Nº 156

==== Reactions to the judicial ruling ====
10 April Protests

The move was denounced by the opposition, with Assembly President Julio Borges making statements on 30 March describing the action as a coup d'état by President Nicolás Maduro. Borges called on the military to intervene, stating that "they cannot remain silent in the face of the violation of the Constitution" and "that FAN officers are also going through drama caused by the high cost of life. We want to make a call on them to be the first guardians of democracy and the Venezuelan Constitution and that they become part of the solution." Finally, Borges called on international attention to the ruling and called for new protests saying "there is fear, there is repression, but it is time to stand up."

Hours later, opposition officials gathered outside of the TSJ headquarters and were attacked by pro-government paramilitary groups called colectivos and National Guard troops. Deputy Juan Requesens was attacked by colectivo forces while Carlos Paparoni was pushed to the concrete by a National Guardsman. A journalist for the National Assembly's broadcast team, El Capitolio TV was struck in the head and required stitches. Government supporters and authorities also attempted to take recording devices away from the media on the scene.

Students protesting the rulings outside of the TSJ on 31 March 2017

In a rare break of ranks, on 31 March 2017, pro-government Attorney General Luisa Ortega Díaz stated on Venezuelan state television while holding a copy of the 1999 Constitution that the TSJ's ruling was a "rupture of constitutional order" and that it was her "duty to inform my country of my deep concern over these events," with her audience responding with a lengthy applause. Borges, the Assembly President, stated that officials should follow Ortega's example and called on the military "to obey the orders of your conscience." Meanwhile, protesters were repressed by the National Guard armed with buckshot and batons. Many demonstrators were arrested, with the media being caught in the assault, having their cameras confiscated while one female reporter of Caracol Radio was singled out by a group of troops and beaten.

On 4 April 2017, opposition called for a march from Plaza Venezuela to the National Assembly with thousands of Venezuelans participating, though access to the meeting point was quickly blocked by the Bolivarian National Guard. Twelve subway stations were closed. Pro-government colectivos blocked opposition marches and fired weapons at protesters, with demonstrations resulting in the injuries of about 42 individuals, including seven police officers, while over 50 people were arrested.

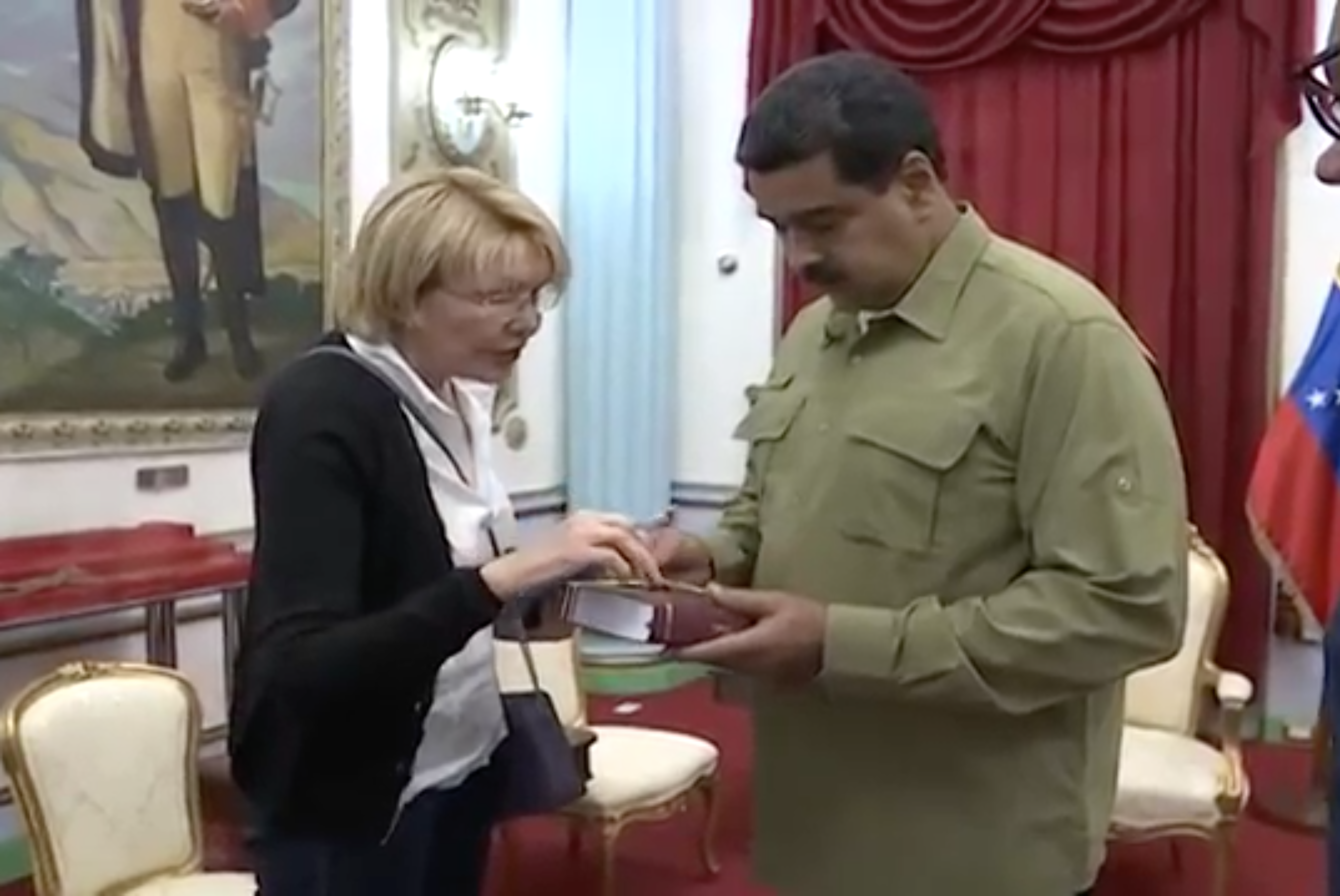
Attorney General Luisa Ortega Díaz meeting with President Maduro on 1 April 2017

In reporting the story, The New York Times noted that in the previous few months Maduro had been swiftly consolidating power, and the Assembly was considered by many to be the sole remaining counterbalance to the President's control. It also noted that following such moves by the government, "many now describe as not just an authoritarian regime, but an outright dictatorship." Fox News also noted that following the sporadic protests that did not produce results, with the government already consolidating itself within the military and politically by canceling elections, calls for further demonstrations as well as the intervention of the armed forces were futile.

==== Reversal of decisions ====
Following the rare criticism from Attorney General Ortega, an inner-circle official, Maduro ordered a review of the TSJ's decision regarding the National Assembly. One day later, the Tribunal reversed that particular order, thereby reinstating the powers of the Assembly. The opposition, however, dismissed the backtracking and called on Venezuelans "to take to the streets" against what they called an attempted coup, arguing that the moves proved that Maduro controlled the judiciary and therefore separation of powers did not exist in the republic. Protests in the country continued after the reversal with the opposition demanding early elections.

==== Proceedings against TSJ ====
Following the reversal of the rulings by the TSJ, the National Assembly prepared proceeding against the court, accusing the court of not being separated from the executive, though Reuters noted that "the move by the opposition-led congress would only be symbolic because it remains powerless". Following the criticism of the TSJ's ruling by Attorney General Ortega, there were calls for her to be involved in the so-called Republican Moral Council, made up of the Prosecutor's Office, the Office of the Comptroller and the Office of the Ombudsman, which had the right to remove members of the TSJ according to the Venezuelan constitution. During protests on 4 April, opposition leaders announced that they would pursue the removal of the seven judges who signed the rulings against the National Assembly.

On 7 April, Ombudsman Tarek William Saab announced the decision of the Republican Moral Council decision on the TSJ judges, stating that he and Comptroller Manuel Galindo had rejected the request to endorse proceedings against the TSJ, whereas Attorney General Ortega had dissented.

=== Constitutional assembly ===
Today, on May 1, I announce that I will use my presidential privileges as constitutional head of state in accordance with article 347, to convene the original constituent power so that the working class and the people can call a national constituent assembly.

— President Nicolás Maduro

==== Proposal ====
On 1 May 2017 following a month of protests that resulted in at least 29 dead, Maduro called for a Constitutional Assembly that would draft a new constitution that would replace the 1999 Venezuela Constitution. He invoked Article 347, and stated that his call for a new constitution was necessary to counter the actions of the opposition. Critics suspected that the members of the Constitutional Assembly would not be elected in open elections, but selected from social organizations loyal to Maduro. The proposal would be an alternative way to close the National Assembly. It would also allow him to stay in power during the interregnum, as the process would take at least two years.

Diosdado Cabello pointed that the new constitution would prevent a politician similar to the Argentine Mauricio Macri from ever becoming president of Venezuela. Macri was elected president in the 2015 presidential elections, ending the 12-years terms of Néstor Kirchner and Cristina Fernández de Kirchner, longtime allies of both Chávez and Maduro.

The MUD started a common front for all the people in Venezuela that oppose the amendment. It is composed by the MUD, the Marea Socialista, minor parties without representatives in the Assembly (such as the marxists Bandera Roja), disenchanted chavistas, the Catholic Church, universities, human rights organizations, lawyers and artists. Eustoquio Contreras is the only deputy that defected from Maduro and opposed the amendment. Luis Salamanca, former rector of the National Electoral Council, considers that the front may not be capable to stop Maduro, as he is unwilling to negotiate the proposal.

==== Approval ====
On 22 May, the Republican Moral Council – which the opposition hoped would establish proceedings against TSJ judges – shared their approval of the National Constitutional Assembly despite the absence of Attorney General Ortega, with Ombudsman Tarek William Saab stating that "The call to the National Constituent Assembly is a constitutional exit to the political situation that the country is living, in order to foster dialogue and coexistence of the country".

The next day on 23 May, Danilo Antonio Mojica Monsalvo, the magistrate of the Social Cassation Chamber of the TSJ announced his disagreement with President Maduro's Constitutional Assembly, stating that without a popular referendum voting on the assembly, the move would be "spurious ... a legal metaphor to describe what is done outside the Constitution". Another TSJ judge, Marisela Godoy, spoke out against Maduro's proposal, stating "At this moment I support, without any fear, the attorney general (Luisa Ortega Díaz), who is not any official" and that if she were to be criticized by the government, she "does not care". However, the Constitutional assembly proposal was accepted by the CNE, with an election slated for 10 July 2017.

==== Reactions to constitutional assembly ====
The call generated further protests. 920 Battalions were created and maintained, composed by 200,000 militias to respond to violent protests. Pedro Carreño, aide of Diosdado Cabello, stated that Venezuela would be suffering an attack similar to the 1973 Chilean coup d'état against Salvador Allende, and that those militias would prevent that. Capriles complained that Maduro is preparing forces to wage a war, and said "let the world see who wants elections and who tries to impose himself by force". Protesters may be tried under military justice, instead of civil courts. The constitution of Venezuela limits the scope of the military courts to crimes of a military nature.

=== Parallel Supreme Tribunal ===
On 20 June 2017, President of the National Assembly Julio Borges, the opposition-led legislative body of Venezuela, announced the activations of Articles 333 and 350 of the Venezuelan Constitution. A "road map" was also enacted by the opposition which entailed the nullification of further actions performed by the TSJ, the call for a continuous, peaceful protest movement "until the restitution of the constitutional order" and for Venezuelans to continue to confront President Maduro's constitutional assembly.

==== Article 333 ====
This Constitution shall not cease to be in effect if it ceases to be observed due to acts of force or because or repeal in any manner other than as provided for herein. In such eventuality, every citizen, whether or not vested with official authority, has a duty to assist in bringing it back into actual effect.

==== Article 350 ====
The people of Venezuela, true to their republican tradition and their struggle for independence, peace and freedom, shall disown any regime, legislation or authority that violates democratic values, principles and guarantees or encroaches upon human rights.

==== Reactions to parallel government ====
According to Jose Vicente Haro, a constitutional lawyer, the Venezuelan opposition should name new directors of Venezuela's branches of government in order to establish a parallel government and to further pursue corrupt individuals, however noting that the Bolivarian government may attempt to jail opposition leaders.

== Reactions ==
=== Domestic ===
- Venezuela – Foreign minister Delcy Rodríguez described the international rejection to the ruling as a right-wing conspiracy against President Maduro, and dismissed the OAS as "imperialist".

=== International ===
==== Supranational bodies ====
- European Union – Federica Mogherini, the High Representative of the Union for Foreign Affairs and Security Policy, stated that the TSJ's decision "restricts the parliamentary immunity of its members, who were democratically elected by the people" and that "[t]he European Union recalls that full respect for the Constitution, democratic principles, the rule of law and the separation of powers is crucial for the country to achieve a peaceful outcome of the current difficult situation and regain political stability".
- Organization of American States – Secretary General Luis Almagro promptly denounced the move and called for the urgent convocation of the Organization's Permanent Council under Article 20 of the Inter-American Democratic Charter.
- Mercosur – In a 31 March statement, the bloc expressed that, "In the face of the grave institutional situation in the Bolivarian Republic of Venezuela ... (members) have decided to call an urgent meeting of Foreign Ministers ... to analyze possible solutions ... The founding countries of Mercosur reiterate their unalterable support for the fundamental principles of the rule of law and for the preservation of democracy in the Latin American region". A day later on 1 April, Mercosur activated a democratic clause due to the "lack of separation of powers", with the clause used to closely monitor the state of democracy in Venezuela, which "does not imply the expulsion". Members also said that they would present a similar case to the OAS so the Inter-American Democratic Charter could be invoked.
- United Nations – U.N. High Commissioner for Human Rights Zeid Ra'ad al-Hussein said in a statement that "the separation of powers is essential for democracy to function, and keeping democratic spaces open is essential to ensure human rights are protected."

==== Governments ====
- Argentina – President Mauricio Macri said "reshaping the democratic order" in Venezuela was necessary, demanding Venezuela to establish an electoral schedule and release political prisoners.
- Brazil – The Ministry of Foreign Affairs issued a statement saying, "Full respect for the principle of independence of powers is an essential element for democracy. The decisions of the Supreme Court violate this principle and fuel political radicalization".
- Chile – President Michelle Bachelet described the situation as "very disturbing" and summoned her Ambassador to "inform" her about the move. Chile later recalled its ambassador.
- Colombia – Minister of Foreign Affairs María Ángela Holguín declared that it was "very clear that we need strong, independent public powers in order to strengthen democracy", stating that Colombia rejected the "non-division of powers". On 31 March 2017, the country recalled its ambassador.
- Costa Rica – Minister of Foreign Relations Manuel González released a statement, saying "Costa Rica considers that these decisions are inadmissible and disappointing, as they are contrary to the essence of democracy and accelerate the deterioration of democratic governance in that country".
- Germany – Speaker of Government Steffen Seibert stated that "It is intolerable how President Maduro is turning the population of his country hostage to his own power ambitions" demanding Venezuela to "return to democratic principles and separation of powers".
- Guatemala – The Ministry of Foreign Affairs stated that the government had a "deep concern about the recent decisions of the Supreme Court of Justice of the Bolivarian Republic of Venezuela" and that "Guatemala reiterates its conviction of preserving the rule of law, adherence to constitutional rules, separation of powers, free expression of thought and unrestricted respect for Human Rights, essential values to conserve and consolidate a representative democracy".
- Mexico – Secretary of Foreign Affairs Luis Videgaray Caso stated that Mexico was "gravely concerned about the deterioration of the democratic order in a sister country" and that the TSJ's move "violates the essential principles and values of representative democracy and separation of powers".
- Panama – The Ministry of Foreign Relations stated that "Panama calls for respect for constitutional order, respect for separation of powers and principles of democracy, and for guarantees to be held for democratic elections".
- Peru – President Pedro Pablo Kuczynski stated in tweets that "Latin America is democratic. It is unacceptable what happens in Venezuela" and that "I condemn the rupture of democracy in Venezuela. I will retire my ambassador in that country", withdrew his Ambassador in Venezuela, and initiated consultations with OAS members on the situation.
- Russia – The Government of Russia said in a statement that "External forces should not add fuel to the fire to the conflict inside Venezuela" and that they "are confident in the principle of non-interference in internal affairs".
- Spain – Prime Minister of Spain Mariano Rajoy stated on Twitter that "if the division of powers is broken, democracy is broken", supporting the push for "freedom, democracy and the rule of law in Venezuela".
- United States – Deputy spokesperson for the Department of State Mark Toner expressed disapproval on behalf of the United States by stating the U.S. considered the dissolution of the Venezuelan National Assembly as "a serious setback for democracy" in the country, further stating "The United States condemns the Venezuelan Supreme Court's March 29 decision to usurp the power of the democratically elected National Assembly..."

==== Others ====
- Socialist International – In a statement titled The Last Vestiges of Democracy in Venezuela Fall, the group stated that the TSJ's declaration was "a critical blow to the last vestiges of democracy" in Venezuela, further stating that "Socialist International, in the face of the gravity of what is happening in Venezuela, condemns and denounces with force and conviction the decision of the TSJ".
- Marco Rubio, U.S. Senator from Florida, made a public statement on Twitter, stating "Venezuela now officially a dictatorship after Supreme Court assumes powers of opposition-controlled congress."

== See also ==
- Timeline of the 2017 Venezuelan protests
- Caracas helicopter incident
