= Cuerpo de Investigaciones Científicas, Penales y Criminalísticas =

Venezuela's largest national police agency

Scientific, Penal, and Criminal Investigation Service Corps
- Cuerpo de Investigaciones Científicas, Penales y Criminalísticas; CICPC
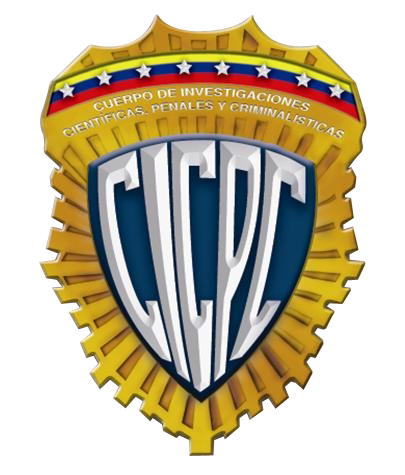
- Seal of CICPC

Agency overview
- Formed: 2001
- Preceding agency: Cuerpo Tecnico de Policia Judicial
- Jurisdiction: Venezuela
- Headquarters: Caracas, Venezuela
- Minister responsible: Diosdado Cabello
- Agency executive: Director
- Website: cicpc.gob.ve

The Scientific, Penal and Criminalistic Investigation Service Corps (Spanish: Cuerpo de Investigaciones Científicas, Penales y Criminalísticas, CICPC) is Venezuela's largest national police agency, responsible for criminal investigations and forensic services. It replaced the Cuerpo Técnico de Policía Judicial (PTJ) in 2001. It is responsible for the scientific clarification of crimes with a view to the subsequent application of justice by the competent authorities. The officers of this special body are trained at the Universidad Nacional Experimental de la Seguridad (UNES). Its current director is General Commissioner Douglas Rico.

== History ==
The history of this agency dates back to the mid-20th century. On 20 February 1958, the president of the Civic-Military Government Junta, Rear Admiral Wolfgang Larrazábal, decided to create a police body dedicated to the investigation of various crimes through Decree No. 48 of the Junta. It also established its function as an auxiliary of the Judiciary, under the name of Judicial Technical Police. The Judicial Police Law of 8 July 1975 established its structure and institutional organization, but it was later replaced by the Penal Investigations Police Law of 11 September 1998.

Eventually, the 1999 constitution was enacted, which established in Article 332 the need to create a body of scientific, penal and criminal investigations. This denomination replaced that of the Cuerpo Técnico de Policía Judicial. In 2001, a reform of the structure and organization of the agency began, which was finally defined in 2003.

== Corruption and extortion in the CICPC ==
In 2015, Venezuela faced a significant increase in corruption cases within its security forces. More than 100 security officers were linked to extortion crimes, reflecting the severe economic crisis and fragile national situation. According to reports from El Nacional, between 1 January and 3 September 2015, 38 cases of extortion involving 121 members of the security forces were reported. However, these numbers may only represent the tip of the iceberg due to the low rate of complaints of this type of crime in the country. The Scientific, Penal and Criminal Investigations Corps (CICPC) was particularly implicated, with 46 of its agents accused of extortion, the highest number among security agencies. The crimes committed included holding civilians' vehicles to demand ransoms and arresting people unable to pay bribes.

Sergio González, former head of internal investigations of the CICPC, pointed out that extortion has been a common crime in the Venezuelan security forces, worsened by economic deterioration and failures in the recruitment of new agents. According to González, the commitment of new agents seems to have faded, focusing mainly on economic benefit. The Venezuelan government's efforts to combat police corruption, including the dismantling of the Metropolitan Police of Caracas in 2011, have not eradicated corrupt practices in the Bolivarian National Police and the CICPC. Economic difficulties, including periods without pay for police officers—such as the seven months in 2014 without payment—have exacerbated the situation, leading officers to use their position to commit crimes that offset their low income.

== See also ==
- Law enforcement in Venezuela
- 2017 Caracas helicopter attack
