= Presidency of Nicolás Maduro =

Venezuelan state from 2013 to 2026

- 19 April 2013 (Note: He was sworn in as Acting President on 5 March 2013 following the Death of Hugo Chávez, but his acting presidency ended on 19 April 2013 when he won the 2013 elections.) – 3 January 2026 (Note: He was captured by the United States and is being judged in US courts. His vice president Delcy Rodriguez was appointed as interim president two days later.)
Presidency of Hugo Chavez	Acting Presidency of Delcy Rodríguez
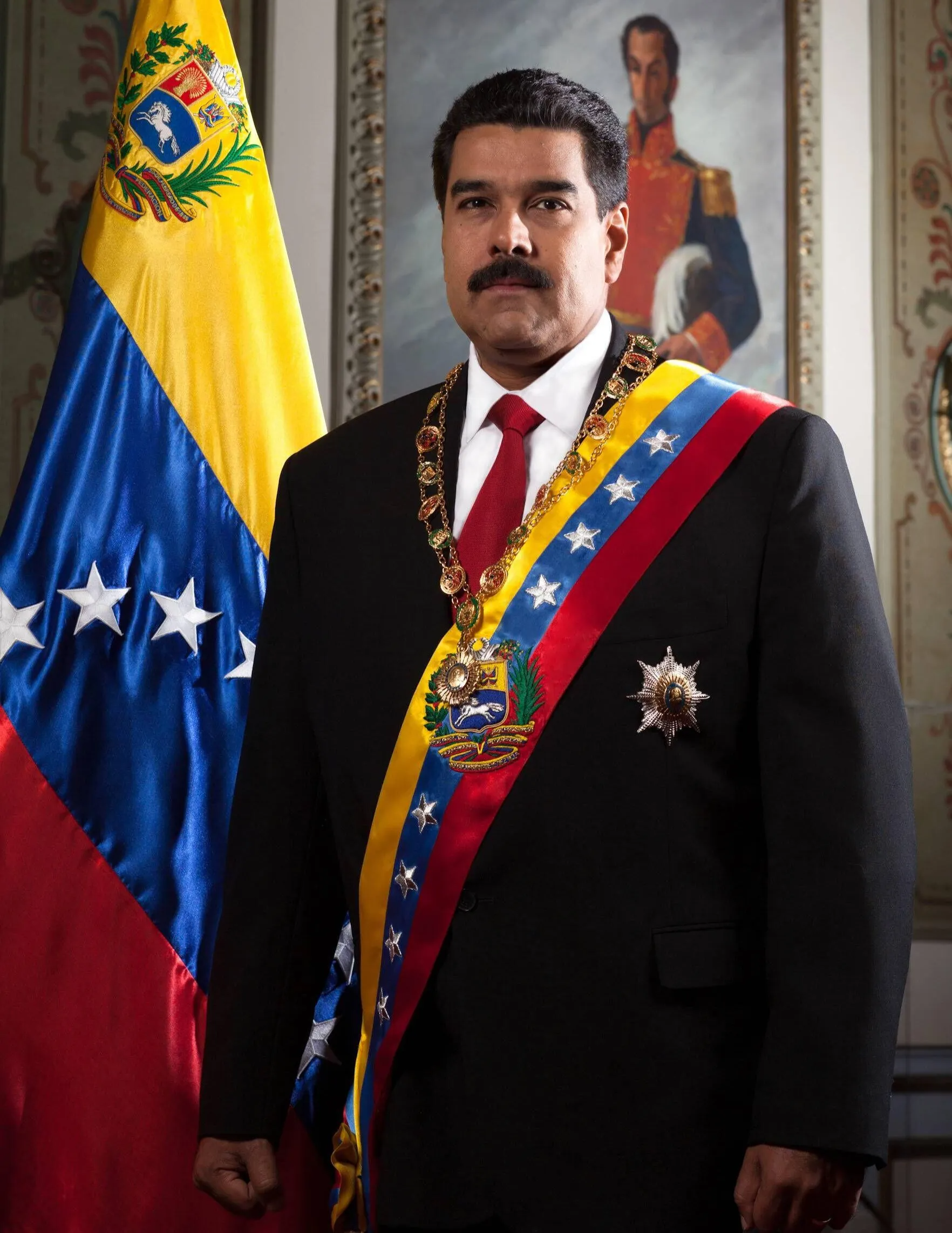
- Official portrait, 2013
- Location: Venezuela
- Including: War on drugs
- Leader: Nicolás Maduro
- President: Nicolás Maduro
- Prime Minister(s): Himself, Jorge Arreaza, (Note: Acting Vice President from 8 March to 19 April 2013.) Aristóbulo Istúriz, Tareck El Aissami, Delcy Rodríguez
- Key events: 2013 Venezuelan presidential election 2018 Venezuelan presidential election Crisis in Venezuela; 2024 Venezuelan presidential election Guyana–Venezuela crisis (2023–2024); Operation Southern Spear; 2026 United States intervention in Venezuela

The Maduro regime refers to the period in Venezuelan history from 2013 to 2026, when Venezuela was ruled by Nicolás Maduro's authoritarian regime. The period began with Maduro's assumption of the presidency on 14 April 2013, and formally came to an end with the U.S. intervention in Venezuela, on 3 January 2026. While Maduro initially operated in a hybrid regime, Venezuela turned into a full dictatorship following the 2017 constitutional crisis.

The second presidency of Nicolás Maduro (2019–2025) (Note: Also called the Second Maduro Government, Second Maduro Cabinet, Second Government of Nicolás Maduro, or the Second Cabinet of Nicolás Maduro) represents the fifth governmental period in Venezuela under the Bolivarian Revolution. It began amidst a 68% voter abstention rate and concluded with allegations of electoral fraud, with Maduro assuming an early start to what would be his third term.

The foreign policy of Maduro's second term was characterized by the severance of diplomatic relations with Argentina, Bolivia (restored in 2020), Brazil (restored in 2022), Colombia (restored in 2022), El Salvador, the United States, Guatemala and Paraguay. As well as a territorial dispute with Guyana over the Essequibo region. In March 2024, Venezuela passed a law that designates Essequibo as a new state of Venezuela, governed from the city of Tumeremo. The law was submitted to the Supreme Court to validate its constitutionality.

Following growing tensions in 2024 and 2025, the United States' Trump administration began preparing an intervention against Nicolás Maduro's government, falsely accusing it of having links with narco-terrorist networks such as the Tren de Aragua and conspiring to flood the United States with narcotics. On 3 January 2026, Venezuela was targeted by a swift U.S. military intervention, dubbed Operation Absolute Resolve, which bombed the country's air defense infrastructure and removed Maduro from power within three hours. During this raid, American troops captured Maduro alongside his wife, Cilia Flores, at their Caracas residence and immediately extradited them to New York. Followed by the capture of Alex Saab, in February 2026. Starting in March 2026, Maduro was put on trial before the U.S. Federal Court in the Southern District of New York to face charges of drug trafficking, criminal conspiracy, and possession of heavy weapons.

== History ==
On 14 April 2013, Nicolás Maduro was elected President of Venezuela, narrowly defeating opposition candidate Henrique Capriles with just a popular vote lead of 1.5%. Capriles immediately demanded a recount, refusing to recognize the outcome as valid. Maduro was later formally inaugurated as president on 19 April, after the election commission had promised a full audit of the election results. On 24 October 2013, he announced the creation of a new agency, the Vice Ministry of Supreme Happiness, to coordinate all the social programmes.

Beginning six months after being elected, Maduro ruled by decree for the majority of his presidency: from 19 November 2013 to 19 November 2014, 15 March 2015 to 31 December 2015, 15 January 2016 to present.

=== 2013–2014 ===
In October 2013, Maduro requested an enabling law to rule by decree in order to fight corruption and to also fight what he called an "economic war" which had the goal of radically reducing poverty. Implementing price controls, wage controls, profit controls, and general economic restructuring. On 19 November 2013, the National Assembly granted Maduro the power to rule by decree until 19 November 2014.

=== 2015–2016 ===
On 10 March 2015, Maduro asked to rule by decree for a second time following the sanctioning of seven Venezuelan officials by the United States, requesting the Enabling Law to be used to "confront" what Maduro called "the aggression of the most powerful country in the world, the United States". Days later on 15 March 2015, the National Assembly granted Maduro power to rule by decree until 31 December 2015.

=== 2016–2017 ===
After a coalition of opposition parties won in the 6 December 2015 elections, the lame duck Assembly named 13 new Justices sympathetic toward Maduro to the Supreme Court. On 15 January 2016, Maduro declared an economic emergency and issued a "vaguely worded" decree that would grant himself extraordinary powers for 60 days, or until 15 March 2016. Days after on 18 March 2016, the expiration of the decree powers, the Supreme Court granted Maduro the power to rule by decree for an additional 60 days, or until 17 May 2016.

Days before his second 60-day rule by decree were to end, Maduro stated on 11 May 2016 that he would continue to rule by decree through the rest of the year until 2017.

=== 2017–2018 ===
While meeting with the Supreme Tribunal of Justice on 15 January 2017, Maduro signed a new economic decree, extending his rule by decree for the sixth time since the original ruling in January 2016. On 19 January, the Supreme Tribunal of Justice established the "Decree on the State of Emergency and Economic Emergency", granting Maduro to rule by decree further into 2017.

On 13 May 2017 at a time of rising unrest during the 2017 Venezuelan protests, President Maduro extended his decree powers for the eighth time since January 2016, allowing him to rule by decree for another 60 days. The powers were extended again on 13 July 2017 for an additional 60 days.

On 15 October, the Bolivarian government Great Patriotic Pole won 18 of the 23 governorships while the opposition only 5 during the 2017 Venezuelan regional elections.

On 10 December, the Bolivarian government Great Patriotic Pole won 306 of the 337 Mayorships during the 2017 Venezuelan municipal elections.

=== Cult of personality ===
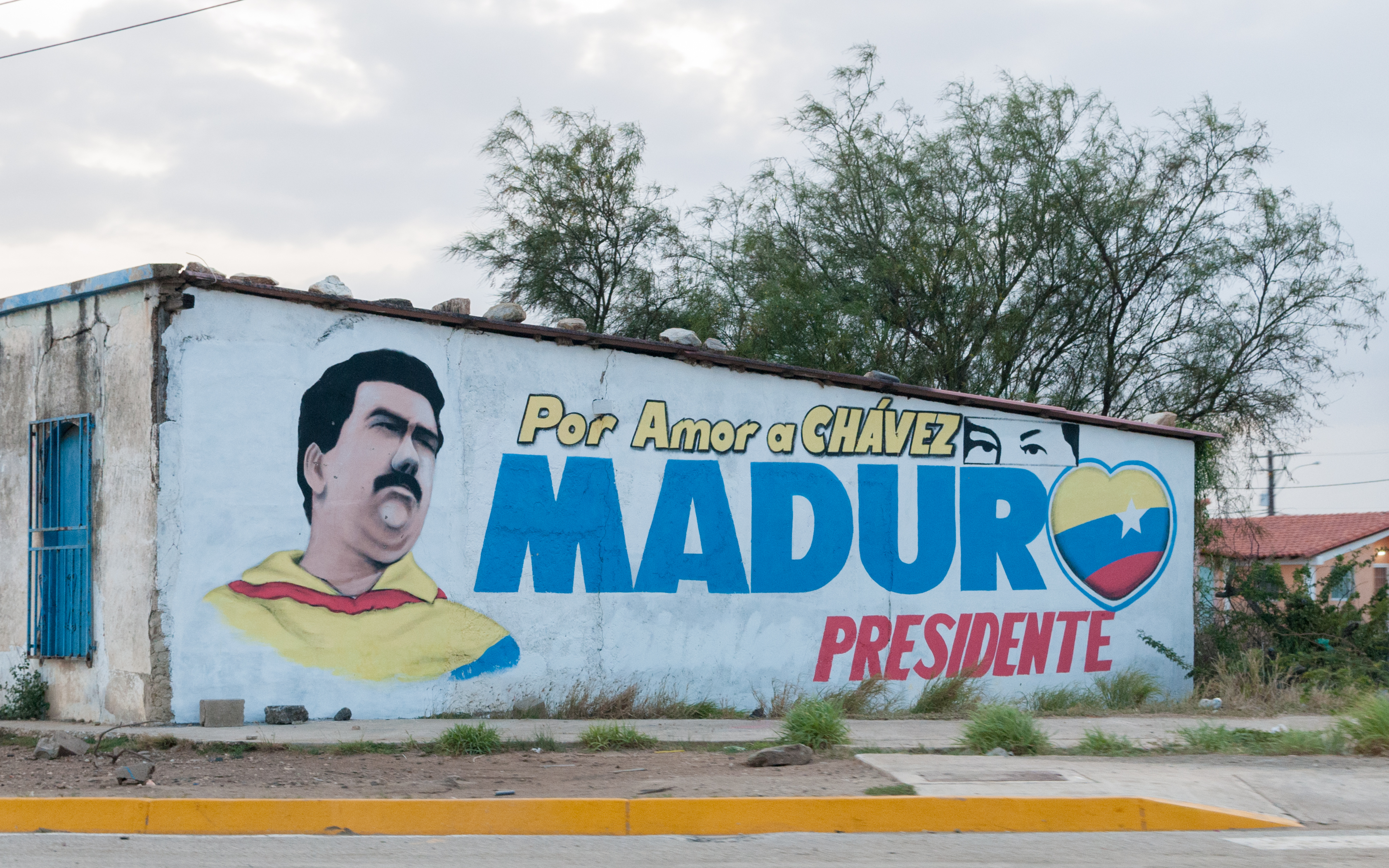
A mural of Nicolás Maduro, saying "For the love of Chávez. Maduro (for) President." with the popular "Chávez eyes" visible.

Just like his predecessor, Maduro maintained a cult of personality, framing himself as the "Son of Chávez," dominating public media with heroic iconography, such as the Súper Bigote y su mano de hierro cartoon, and flooding urban landscapes with official murals and billboards. Following Maduro's ousting during the 2026 U.S. intervention, Maduro's cult of personality was systematically erased by authorities.

=== Military authority ===
Since coming to power three years ago, Mr. Maduro has relied increasingly on the armed forces as a spiraling economic crisis pushed his approval ratings to record lows and food shortages led to lootings. ... The armed forces have swiftly repressed all opposition rallies as well as the food riots that flare up daily across the country.

— The Wall Street Journal

Maduro relied on the military to maintain power since he was initially elected into office. According to Luis Manuel Esculpi, a Venezuelan security analyst, "The army is Maduro's only source of authority." As time passed, Maduro grew more reliant on the military, showing that Maduro was losing power as described by Amherst College professor, Javier Corrales. Corrales explains that "From 2003 until Chavez died in 2013, the civilian wing was strong, so he did not have to fall back on the military. As civilians withdrew their support, Maduro was forced to resort to military force." The New York Times stated that Maduro no longer had the oil revenue to buy loyalty for protection, instead relying on favorable exchange rates, as well as the smuggling of food and drugs, which "also generate revenue".

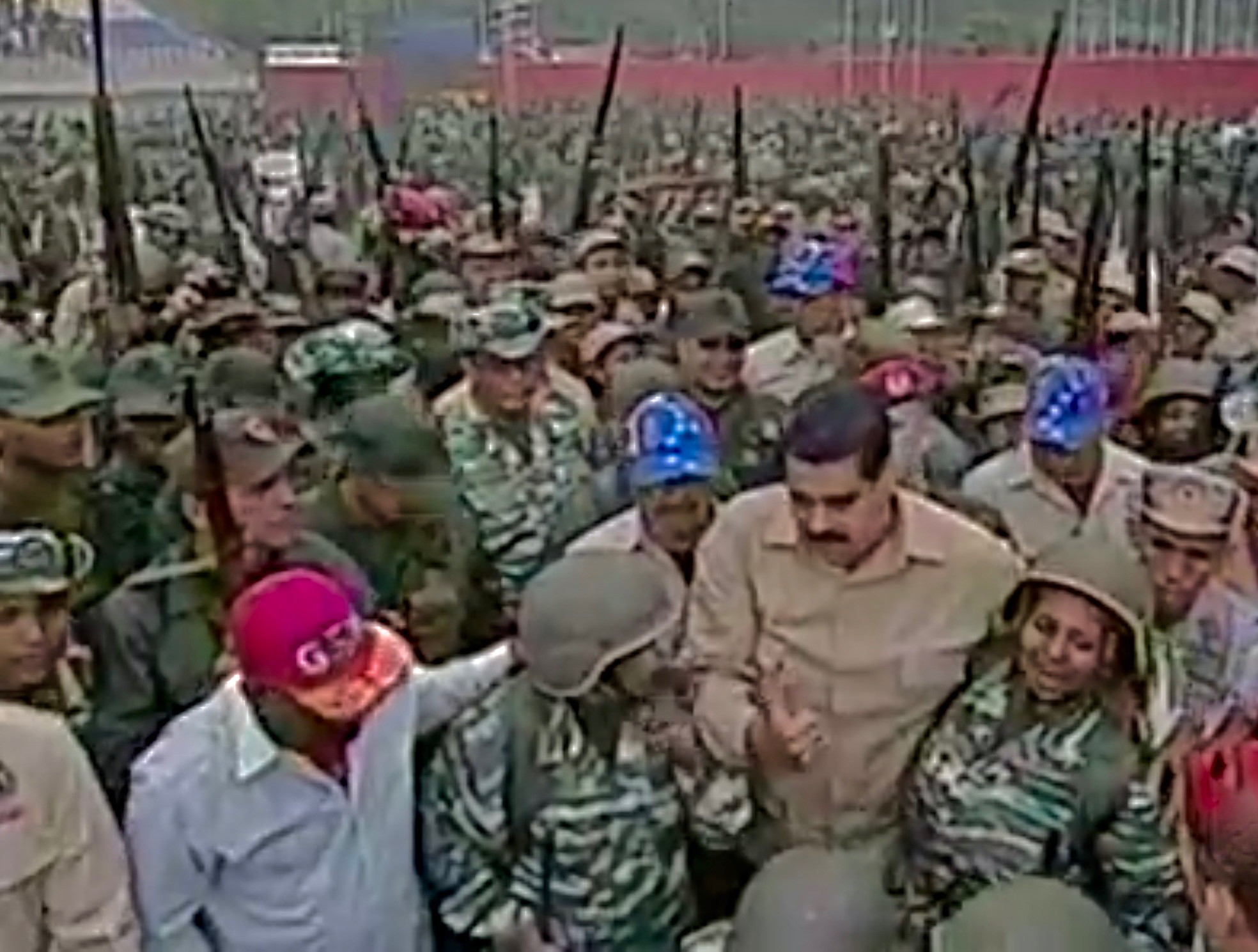
President Maduro among troops during a May 2016 exercise

On 12 July 2016, Maduro granted Defense Minister Vladimir Padrino López the power to oversee product transportation, price controls, the Bolivarian missions, while also having his military command five of Venezuela's main ports. This action performed by President Maduro made General Padrino one of the most powerful people in Venezuela, possibly "the second most powerful man in Venezuelan politics". The appointment of Padrino was also seen to be similar to the Cuban government's tactic of granting the Cuban military the power to manage Cuba's economy. It is the first time since the dictatorship of General Marcos Perez Jimenez in 1958 that a military official has held such power in Venezuela. According to Corrales, "For all of the ministers of the cabinet to have to respond to a soldier, this is associated with military dictatorships".

According to Nicolás Maduro:

All ministries and government institutions are subordinated to the National Command of the Great Mission for Safe Sovereign and Safe Supply, which is under the command of the President and of the top General, Vladimir Padrino López.

=== Domestic policy ===
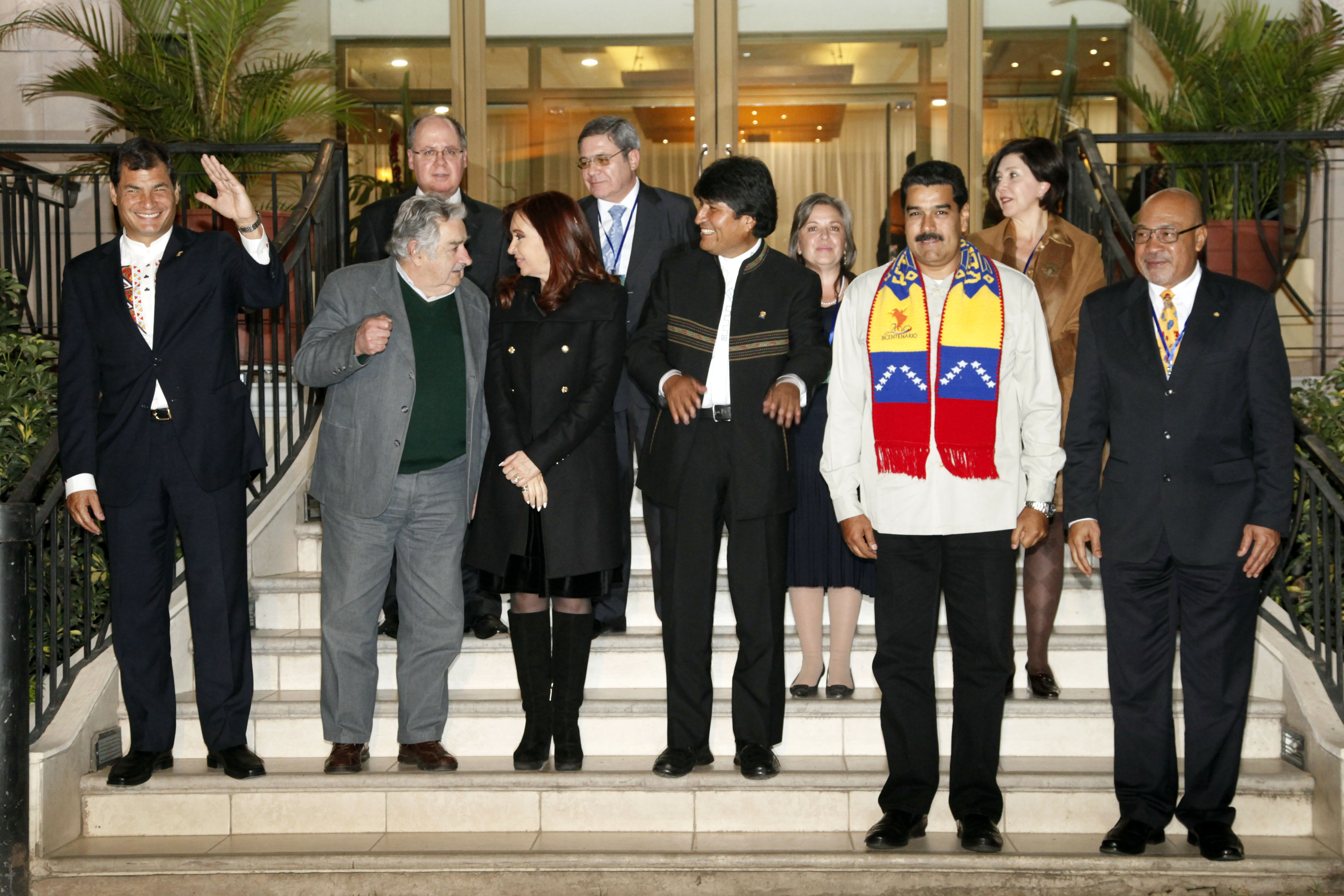
UNASUR special meeting to discuss the diversion of Bolivian President Evo Morales' plane in Europe, 4 July 2013

Maduro said that Venezuela was not facing a humanitarian crisis. Maduro stuck to his predecessor Hugo Chávez's policies in order to remain popular to those who find a connection between the two. Despite the increasingly difficult crises facing Venezuela, such as a faltering economy and high crime rate, Maduro continued the use of Chávez's policies.

After continuing Chávez's policies, Maduro's support among Venezuelans began to decrease, with Bloomberg explaining that he held on to power by placing opponents in jail and impeding upon Venezuela's freedom of press. According to Marsh, instead of making any policy changes, Maduro placed attention on his "hold on power by closing off the legal channels through which the opposition can act". Shannon K. O'Neil of the Council on Foreign Relations stated that "After Chavez's death, Maduro has just continued and accelerated the authoritarian and totalitarian policies of Chavez".

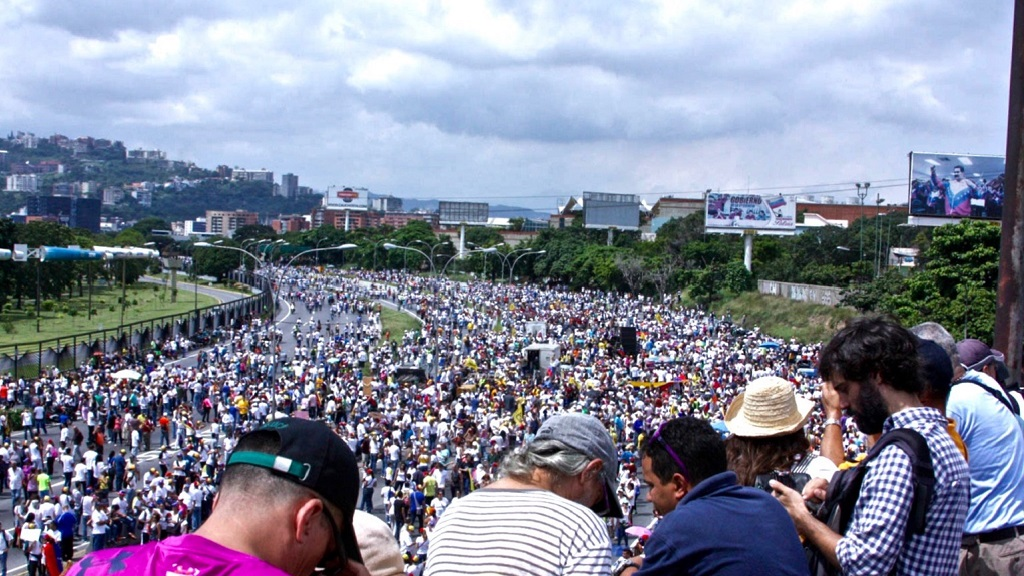
The rally against Maduro's government in October 2016

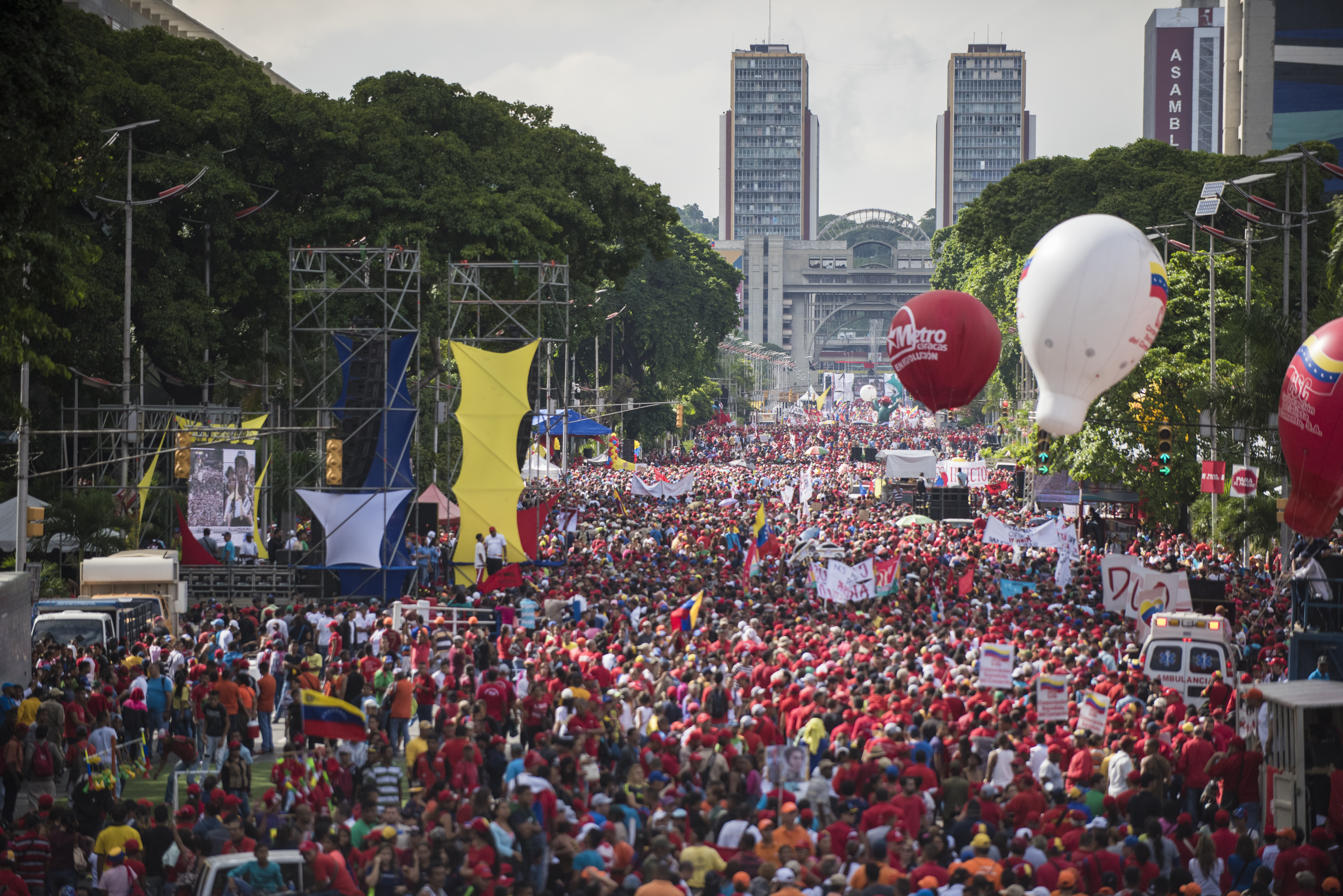
The rally in support of Maduro's government in December 2016

Regarding Maduro's ideology, Professor Ramón Piñango, a sociologist from the Venezuelan University of IESA, "Maduro has a very strong ideological orientation, close to the Communist ideology. Contrary to Diosdado, he is not very pragmatic". Maduro himself stated that Venezuela must build a more socialist nation, highlighting that the country needs an economic overhaul, a political-military union and government involvement in the workplace.

=== Crime ===
One of the first important presidential programs of Maduro became the "Safe Homeland" program, a massive police and military campaign to build security in the country. Three thousand soldiers were deployed to decrease homicide in Venezuela, which has one of the highest rates of homicide in Latin America. Most of these troops were deployed in the state of Miranda (Greater Caracas), which has the highest homicide rate in Venezuela. According to the government, in 2012, more than 16,000 people were killed, a rate of 54 people per 100,000, although the Venezuela Violence Observatory, a Venezuelan NGO, state that the homicide rate was 73 people per 100,000. The program had to be reinitiated one year later after the program's creator, Miguel Rodríguez Torres, was replaced by Carmen Melendez Teresa Rivas. Murder also increased over the years since the program's initiation according to the Venezuela Violence Observatory, with the murder rate increasing to 82 per 100,000 in 2014. 23,047 homicides were committed in Venezuela in 2018, a rate of 81.4 per 100,000 people.

=== Economic ===
When elected in 2013, Maduro continued the majority of existing economic policies of his predecessor Hugo Chávez. When entering the presidency, Maduro's Venezuela faced a high inflation rate and large shortages of goods that was left over from the previous administration of President Chávez.

Maduro blamed wealthy businessmen for hoarding goods and speculation that is driving high rates of inflation and creating widespread shortages of staples, and often said he was fighting an "economic war", calling newly enacted economic measures "economic offensives" against political opponents he and loyalists state are behind an international economic conspiracy. However, Maduro was criticized for only concentrating on public opinion instead of tending to the practical issues economists have warned the Venezuelan government about or creating any ideas to improve the economic situation in Venezuela such as the "economic war".

Venezuela was ranked as the top spot globally with the highest misery index score in 2013, 2014, 2015, and 2016. In 2014, Venezuela's economy entered an economic depression that continued as of 2017. Under Maduro's rule, GDP approximately halved.

=== Defense ===
In 2023, Nicolás Maduro conducted a significant reshuffling of the Venezuelan military high command, retiring the general commanders of all branches: the Army, Military Aviation, National Guard, and Navy, as well as the commanders of the civilian-military Bolivarian Militia, the Integrated Aerospace Defense Command (Codai), and the Inspector General of the Armed Forces.

In May 2024, it was announced that one million members of the Bolivarian Militia would undergo weapons training.

=== Media policy ===
In 2019, several international news channels were taken off the air in Venezuela, including Canal 24 Horas, TV Chile, Antena 3, National Geographic, CNN, BBC, Telearuba, and TeleCuraçao. Between 2021 and 2022, the National Commission of Telecommunications (Conatel) blocked 45 news websites. The Inter American Press Association condemned these actions as a "gag on independent journalism." In 2023, TBS and TruTV also ceased broadcasting in the country. Following a report on corruption in Venezuela, the German broadcaster Deutsche Welle was taken off the air in March 2024, with President Maduro criticizing the outlet as "Nazi."

According to the Chapultepec Index by the Inter American Press Association, Venezuela was ranked last (#22) in the index of freedom of expression and the press in the Americas for both 2020 and 2021, receiving the classification of a country "without freedom of expression." The country rose to the #21 position in 2022 and remained there in 2023, still with the classification of "without freedom of expression."

=== Military ===
Since coming to power three years ago, Mr. Maduro has relied increasingly on the armed forces as a spiraling economic crisis pushed his approval ratings to record lows and food shortages led to lootings. ... The armed forces have swiftly repressed all opposition rallies as well as the food riots that flare up daily across the country.

— The Wall Street Journal

Maduro relied on the military to maintain power since he was initially elected into office. He promised to make Venezuela a great power by 2050, stating that the Venezuelan military would lead the way to make the country "a powerhouse, of happiness, of equality".

On 12 July 2016, Maduro granted Defense Minister Vladimir Padrino López the power to oversee product transportation, price controls, the Bolivarian missions, while also having his military command five of Venezuela's main ports. This action performed by President Maduro made General Padrino one of the most powerful people in Venezuela, possibly "the second most powerful man in Venezuelan politics". The appointment of Padrino was also seen to be similar to the Cuban government's tactic of granting the Cuban military the power to manage Cuba's economy.

According to Nicolás Maduro:

All ministries and government institutions are subordinated to the National Command of the Great Mission for Safe Sovereign and Safe Supply, which is under the command of the President and of the top General, Vladimir Padrino López.

It was the first time since the dictatorship of General Marcos Pérez Jiménez in 1958 that a military official has held such power in Venezuela.

=== Judicial policy ===
==== Appointment of magistrates ====
The 2015 Venezuelan parliamentary election was held on 6 December 2015. The elections resulted in the victory of the Democratic Unity Roundtable (MUD), the main opposition movement to the government of President Nicolás Maduro, with 112 of the 167 seats in the National Assembly (56.2% of the vote), and the first major electoral victory for the opposition in 17 years.

In response to the opposition's victory, Chavismo reacted with the appointment of 13 principal magistrates and 21 substitutes to the Supreme Tribunal of Justice (TSJ), carried out on 23 December 2015 by the National Assembly dominated by Chavistas in a record time of less than fifteen days. Both the opposition and various legal scholars described the appointments as illegal because they were not carried out in accordance with the Constitution of Venezuela and the Organic Law of the Supreme Tribunal of Justice, including violations of the objection period, the lack of responses to objections, and the omission of the final selection of candidates, in addition to the fact that the appointments were made after the legislative year had ended on 15 December.

==== Suspension of Amazonas deputies ====
On 5 January 2016, the constitutional term of the National Legislative Power began, with a total of 163 of the 167 deputies elected in December 2015, due to the suspension of the election in Amazonas state by the Venezuelan Supreme Tribunal of Justice (TSJ), affecting four deputies. On 6 January 2016, before the beginning of the first ordinary session, three of the four deputies whose elections had been suspended by the TSJ were sworn in by Assembly president Henry Ramos Allup, arguing that the court's decision was unconstitutional. The remaining deputy, who belonged to the United Socialist Party of Venezuela, decided not to be sworn in. Days later, the deputies decided to step down in order to end the supposed "contempt", with the Parliament approving the measure and notifying the TSJ of the decision on 13 January; however, the TSJ has not issued a ruling lifting the contempt sentence to this day.

==== Institutional crisis ====
As a result of the 2017 Venezuelan constitutional crisis, the Public Ministry formally requested the annulment of the appointments, arguing that the process had been flawed. Consequently, the National Assembly, now with an opposition majority, on 13 June 2017 swore in the Judicial Nominations Committee, chaired by deputy Carlos Berrizbeitia, for the election of new principal TSJ magistrates. Although all the stages contemplated in the constitution and in the Organic Law of the Supreme Tribunal of Justice were completed, Venezuela's Republican Moral Council refused to carry out the preselection, arguing that the process was untimely. Despite the council's refusal, on 21 July 2017 the National Assembly appointed 13 principal magistrates and 21 substitutes; by 24 July, three magistrates had been detained and 30 were in hiding.

Attorney General Luisa Ortega Díaz criticized the appointments, arguing that they created disorder within the state. For its part, the TSJ warned that the appointments were null under the pretext of the alleged contempt in which the National Assembly remained, while simultaneously requesting that civilian and military courts exercise the necessary measures of coercion.

=== Electoral policy ===
==== 2013 municipal elections ====
===== Dakazo =====
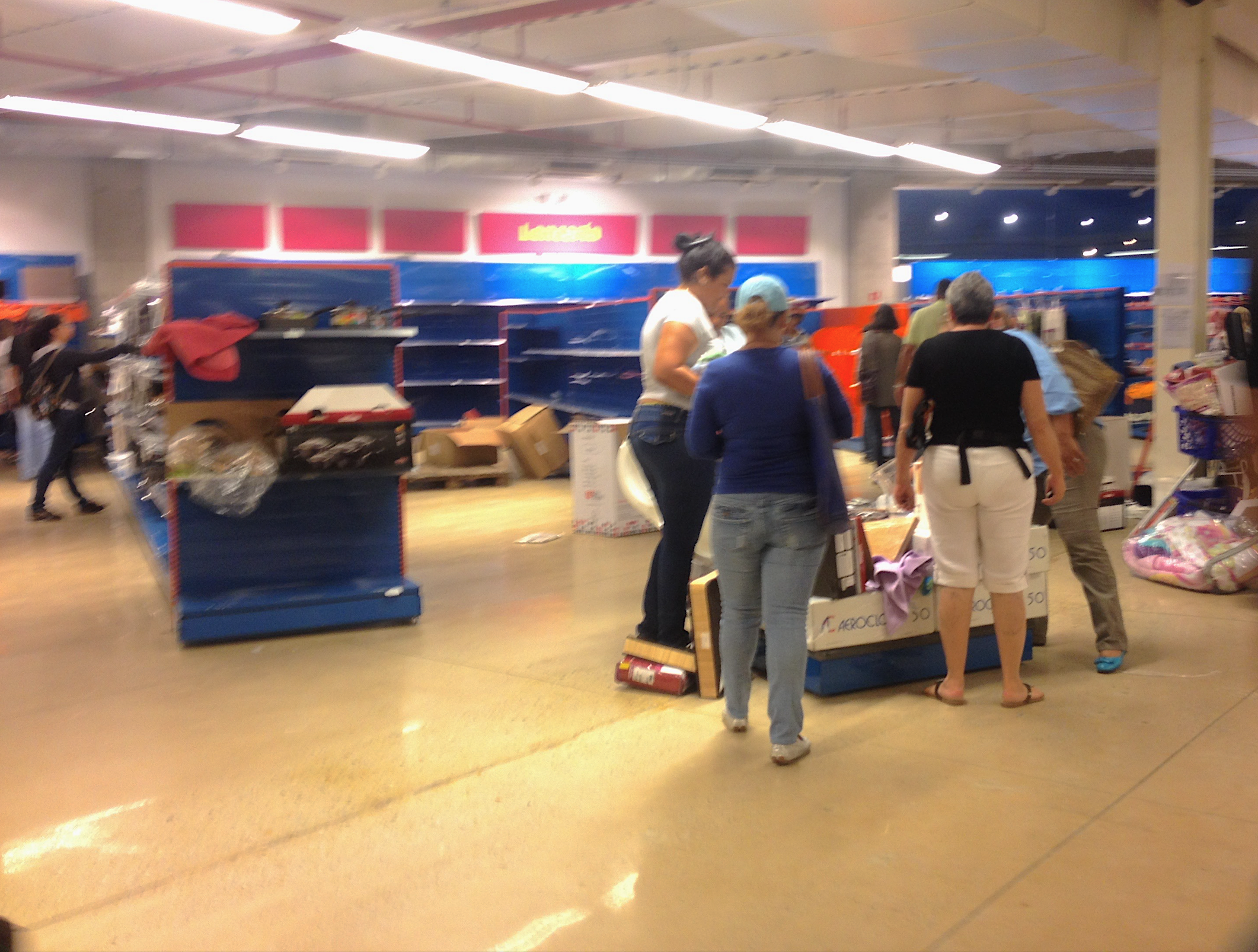
Dakazo.

The Dakazo was a series of actions taken by the Venezuelan government forcing consumer electronics stores, mainly Daka, to sell products at much lower prices on 8 November 2013, weeks before the municipal elections that same year and one month before Christmas. The price changes helped the ruling party, the PSUV, win some of the municipal elections, but also caused looting and product shortages in the following months.

===== Municipal elections =====
The municipal elections had originally been scheduled for Sunday, 14 April 2013, but due to the death of President Hugo Chávez and the announcement of new presidential elections for the same day, the National Electoral Council decided to postpone them until 8 December 2013. The results announced by the CNE indicated a victory for the PSUV and its allies in most municipalities of the country, obtaining 240 of the 337 mayoralties, although the major cities were governed by opposition candidates. The ruling alliance also obtained the majority of municipal councils and the majority of votes nationwide, with 5,216,522 votes representing 48.69%, while the opposition alliance MUD obtained 4,373,910 votes representing 39.34%. The opposition won at least 81 mayoralties, an increase of 33.9% compared to the 56 mayoralties it had held four years earlier.

==== Suspension of the presidential recall referendum ====
On 20 October 2016, the Venezuelan National Electoral Council (CNE) suspended, until further notice, the collection of signatures corresponding to 20 percent of those registered in the national electoral registry required to request a recall referendum against the president's mandate. This occurred because five different courts in the states of Carabobo, Aragua, Bolívar, Monagas and Apure simultaneously ruled to annul the first signature collection process for the referendum. On 21 October, the criminal court of Zulia state did the same.

===== Reactions =====
Opponents of the Maduro government considered the annulment a breakdown of Venezuela's constitutional order, and it was denounced by the Secretary General of the Organization of American States, since this popular vote was guaranteed and protected by the 1999 Constitution of Venezuela, established during the government of Hugo Chávez. Eleven OAS member states expressed concern over the suspension of the recall referendum in a public letter.

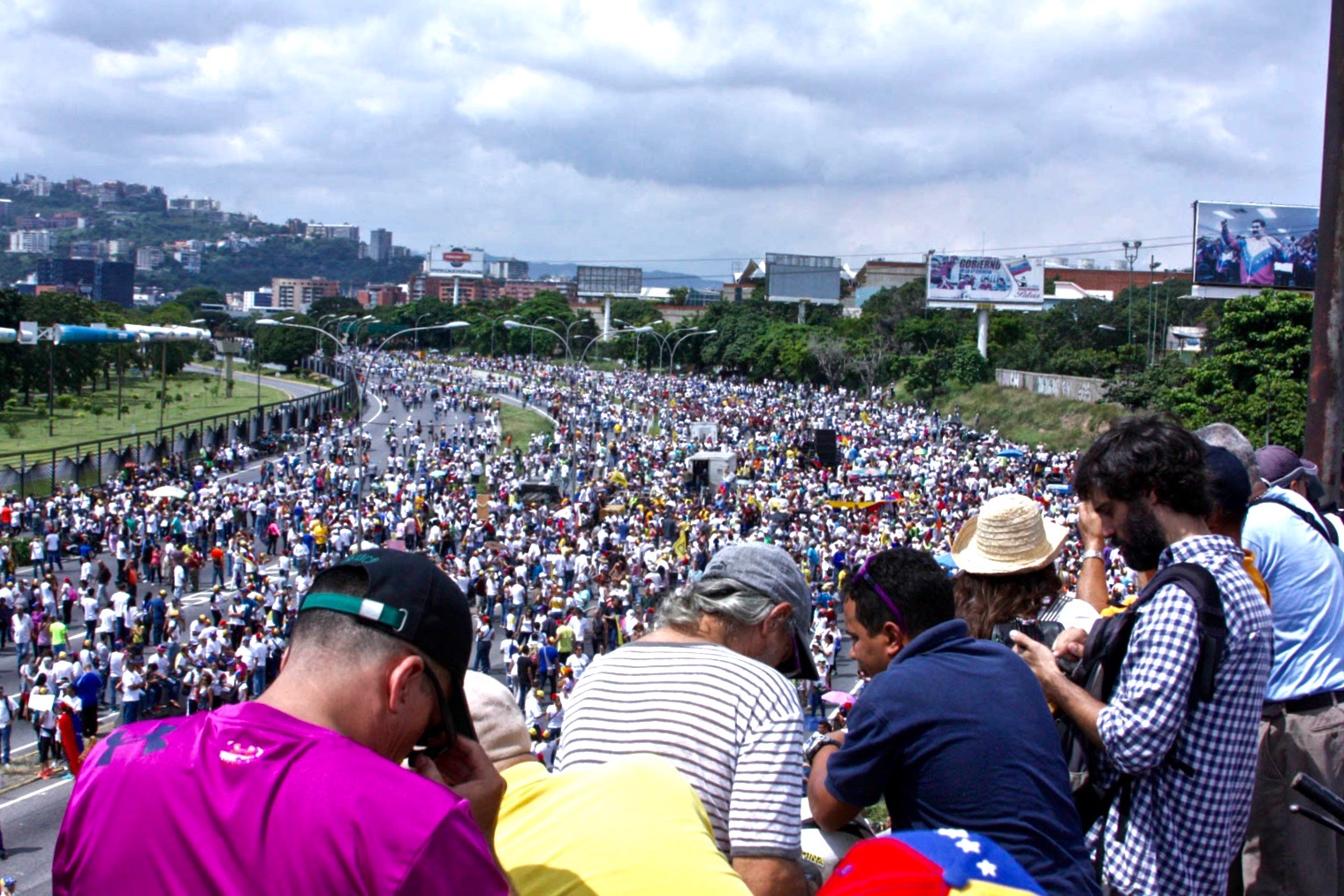
Protests over the suspension of the referendum

Opponents also argued that the supposed constitutional breakdown was worsened by the adoption of a ruling by a lower court of regional jurisdiction as if it were valid nationwide. According to critics, this action would have been irregular because it went against standard Venezuelan legislative mechanisms, whereby only a court with national jurisdiction would be valid to modify or suspend a national referendum.

The 2016 Venezuelan general strike was called for Friday, 28 October 2016, by several Venezuelan trade union organizations, including Democratic Action, Alianza Bravo Pueblo, Convergence, Liberal Force, Justice First, A New Era, and movements such as the Venezuelan student movement, as a protest against the suspension of the presidential recall referendum.

==== 2018 presidential election ====
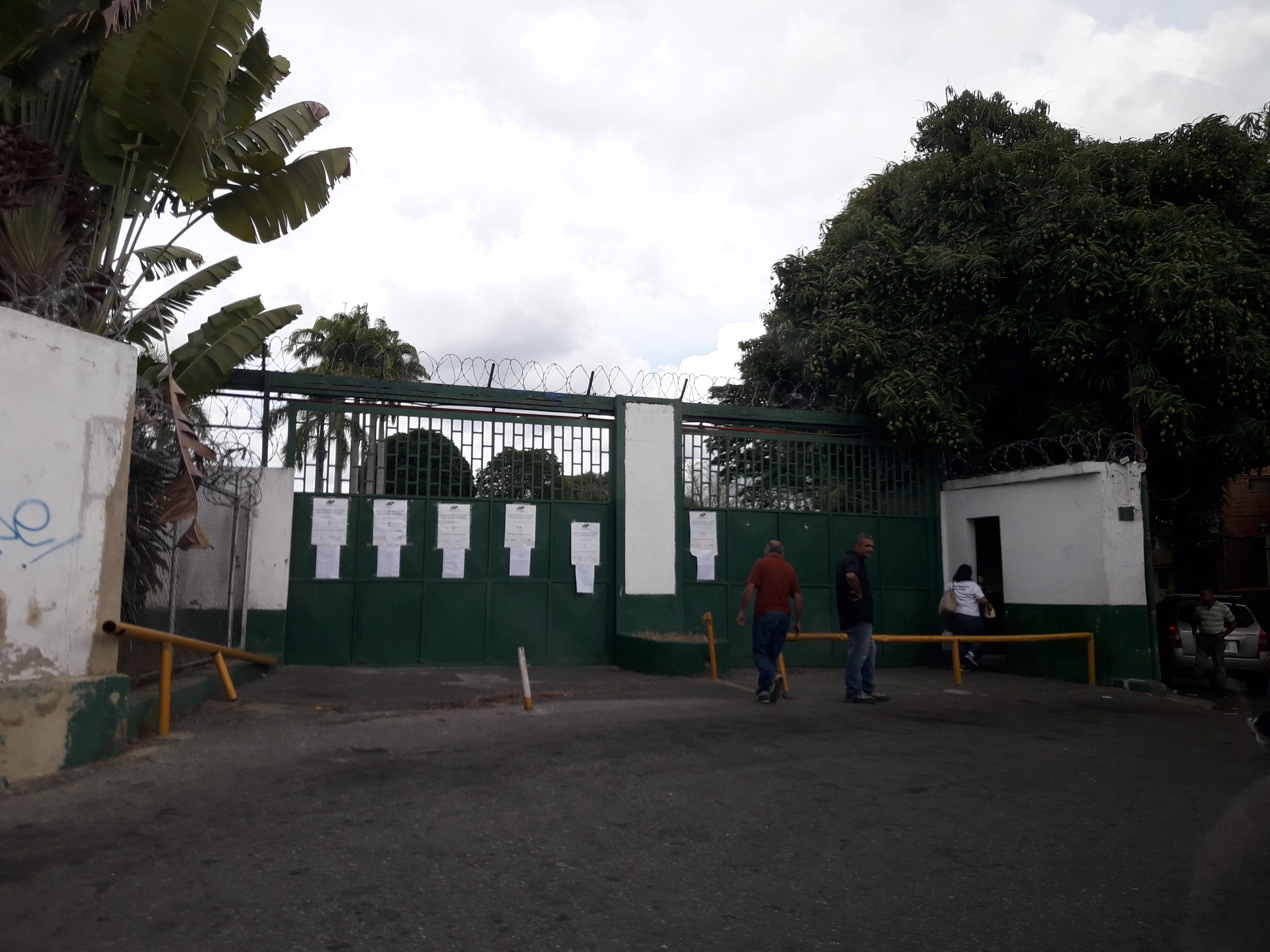
Empty polling station in Caracas during the 2018 elections.

The presidential elections in Venezuela for the 2019–2025 term were held on Sunday, 20 May 2018. International organizations such as the Office of the United Nations High Commissioner for Human Rights, the European Union, the Organization of American States and other countries rejected the election call due to its lack of transparency and electoral guarantees and stated that they would not recognize the results. However, countries such as Russia, China, Turkey, North Korea, Iran, Bolivia, Cuba, El Salvador and Nicaragua expressed support for the elections.

The election, criticized for lacking transparency in the process of calling and conducting it, as well as for allegations concerning the use of political checkpoints near polling centers and the bias of the electoral authority, was internationally condemned. The contest registered the highest abstention rate in presidential election history since the return of democracy in 1958.

Subsequently, at the beginning of January 2019, close to the inauguration date of reelected candidate Nicolás Maduro, a series of statements were issued expressing non-recognition of him as president, including by the Organization of American States, the European Union and its member states.

=== Security policy ===
At the end of 2012, Venezuela's Minister of Interior and Justice, Néstor Reverol, said that murders had increased by 14% in 2012, reaching the figure of 16,072 homicides. On 13 May 2013 the Safe Homeland Plan began, which involved the deployment of 3,000 troops of the National Army in Caracas to assume functions of public security.

On 22 September 2014, President Maduro announced that his government would invest $47 million for the creation of 60 new disarmament centers, and $39 million to finance the disarmament plan under which National Guard troops would patrol the most dangerous neighborhoods.

On 13 July 2015 Maduro launched Operation Liberation of the People (OLP), a police deployment as a response to the increase of violence in Venezuela. It consists of operations where citizens are detained and verified in the Integrated Police Information System (SIIPOL) in order to determine whether any crime has been committed. In April 2016 the Special Actions Forces (FAES), a command of the Bolivarian National Police (PNB), was created. The FAES have been accused of being a political instrument of President Nicolás Maduro, as well as receiving accusations of being an extermination group and repression of opponents.

==== El Junquito massacre ====
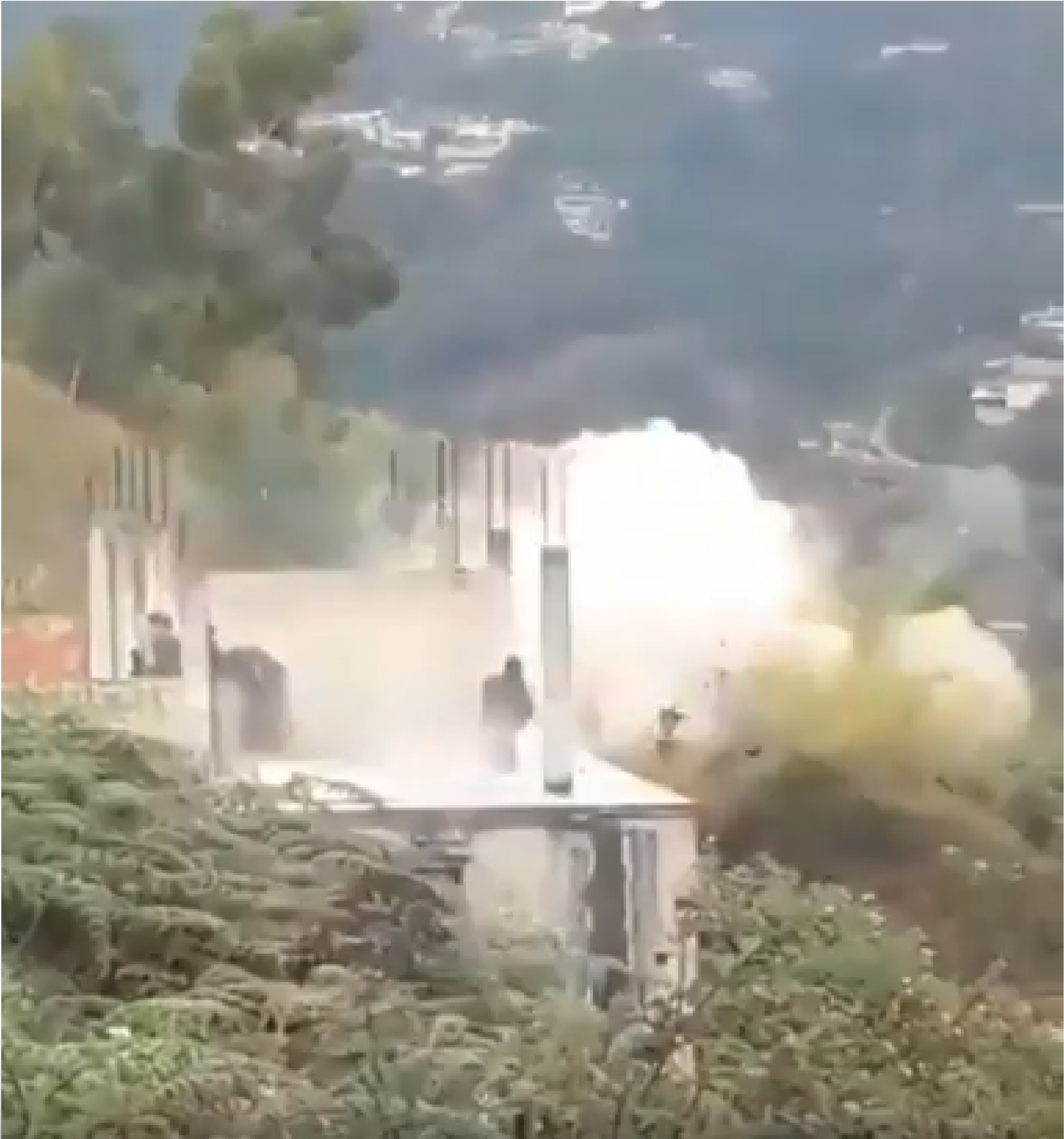
Exact moment of the bombing against Óscar Alberto Pérez by the forces of the Bolivarian government.

On 15 January 2018 the Operation Gideon was carried out in the El Junquito neighborhood, northwest of Caracas, where officials of the CONAS, SEBIN, DGCIM, GNB, FAES, PNB and Policaracas stormed the El Junquito Parish in search of Oscar Pérez. Immediately afterwards a confrontation occurred, leaving several dead and wounded.

Óscar Pérez died during the police operation. In the operation ten people died: seven members of the opposition group, two officers of the Bolivarian National Police Corps and one leader of the so-called colectivos. Various national and international movements and organizations categorized the action as a "massacre" and/or "extrajudicial execution".

After the death of Óscar Pérez, people close to him revealed that those responsible for the homicide had received the order not to take anyone alive and to kill Pérez. Shortly afterwards, Maduro confirmed that he had given the order to kill Óscar Pérez and threatened to apply the same tactic to any opposition group that he considered terrorist.

In the aftermath, Masonic lodges in Venezuela were raided. The death of Perez, a Free Mason, and subsequent government activities, were publicly condemned by lodges. It marked a history of Maduro's opposition to the fraternity. Maduro had previously called Perez a terrorist.

==== 2018 Caracas attack ====
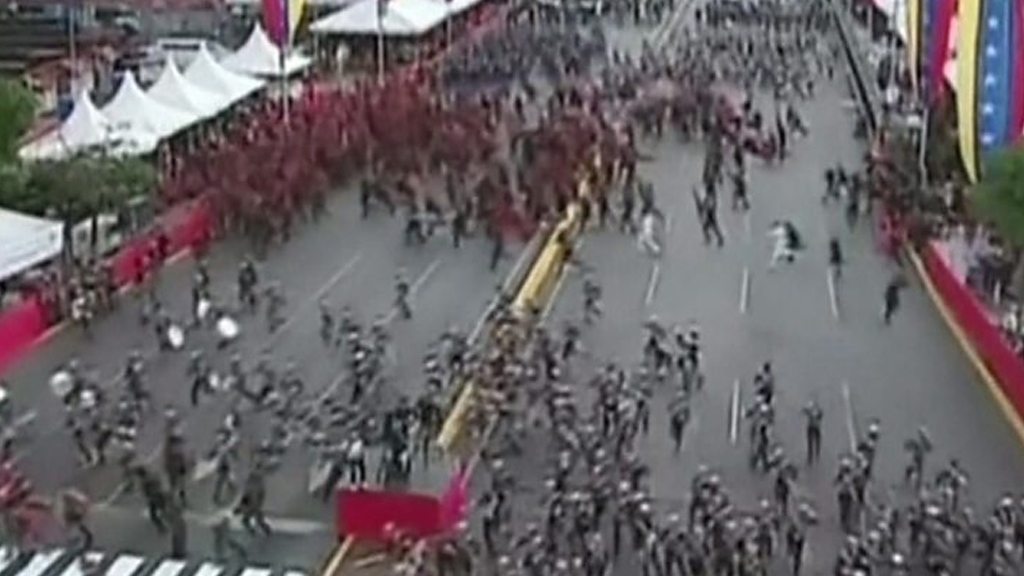
2018 Caracas attack.

On 4 August 2018, in Caracas, Maduro was giving a speech at an event for the commemoration of the 81 years since the creation of the Bolivarian National Guard (GNB), when an explosion of a drone loaded with the explosive C-4 occurred. The president was unharmed, but seven members of the GNB were reported injured. As a consequence the detention of Juan Requesents, deputy of the National Assembly, occurred, in addition to the arrest and assassination of opposition leader Fernando Albán Salazar.

=== Transport policy ===
==== Crisis with airlines ====
Beginning in November 2013 some airlines began to have problems for the repatriation of capital to their main headquarters, after selling tickets in bolívares for reimbursement in dollars through the Cadivi system. The government maintains a debt with around 32 airlines since before 2014 in the time of CADIVI for a value of US$3.5 billion, expressed the president of the Association of Airlines in Venezuela (Alav), Humberto Figuera

On 17 March 2014 Air Canada announced that it suspended indefinitely its operations in Venezuela due to the lack of cancellation of the debt that the government maintained with the airline. On 2 June Alitalia suspended operations in Venezuela due to the multimillion-dollar debt of the government with the airline. By November 2019 the debt to the airlines remained, year for which there were nine foreign airline companies firmly operating

=== Odebrecht case in Venezuela ===
==== Allegations of bribery ====
The United States Department of Justice investigated the Brazilian construction company Odebrecht and determined that it had paid around 788 million dollars in bribes to 11 countries, apart from Brazil, beginning in 2001. Of this amount, Odebrecht allegedly gave around 98 million dollars to government officials and intermediaries in order to obtain State contracts. Odebrecht admitted responsibility and agreed to pay a fine of around 3.5 billion dollars.

In Venezuela, 31 projects awarded to the Brazilian company without bidding became known under the alleged binational agreement (agreement between states) but which was carried out between the Venezuelan state and a private company from Brazil, as in the case of the Tocoma Dam when in February 2016 the external adviser of the Brazilian Odebrecht company and representative of the OIV Consortium could not satisfactorily explain to deputies of the National Assembly how the Tocoma Hydroelectric Plant project had four years of delay when he was questioned, for which political responsibility was declared for seven former electricity ministers: Rafael Ramírez Carreño; Alí Rodríguez Araque; Jesse Chacón; Argenis Chávez; Nervis Villalobos, and Javier Alvarado.

==== Conviction of Marcelo Odebrecht in Brazil ====
On 7 March 2016, the former president of the company, Marcelo Odebrecht, was sentenced to 19 years and four months in prison in Brazil for having paid more than 30 million dollars in bribes to Petrobras executives in exchange for contracts and influence.

==== Allegations of financing Chávez and Capriles campaigns ====
Between June and December 2017 it was alleged that the Odebrecht company had financed the campaigns of the two main presidential candidates of the 2012 elections: Hugo Chávez (the Brazilian publicist Mônica Moura was detained by the Brazilian justice system and declared that Chávez's campaign cost 35 million dollars and was illegally financed by Odebrecht) and Henrique Capriles (who denied the accusations) for a smaller figure, with him being denounced before the Prosecutor's Office by politician Luis Tellerías because of these events.

==== Freezing of Swiss accounts linked to a relative of Haiman El Troudi ====
In July 2017, prosecutors in Switzerland froze 42 million dollars from eight bank accounts that received transfers from offshore companies linked to Odebrecht in the name of Elita Zacarías, mother-in-law of former minister Haiman El Troudi, and both Elita del Valle and El Troudi's wife, María Baptista, were summoned as defendants for allegedly being related to the corruption case. The court in charge of the case in Venezuela exempted the family from responsibility, disregarding the investigations carried out in Switzerland. During his administration, El Troudi used supplementary documents to modify the amounts in contracts for works such as Caracas Metro Guarenas-Guatire, Line 5 of the Caracas Metro, Line 2 of the Los Teques Metro and Metrocable (Caracas) Mariche-La Dolorita.

==== Complaint against Maduro by the Prosecutor's Office ====
On 19 August 2017 attorney general Luisa Ortega Díaz made a complaint against Nicolás Maduro through an audio released by the prosecutor's office of Puebla in the Odebrecht bribery case; around 98 million dollars would have been received between 2005 and 2015. This led her to flee the country, leaving from the Paraguaná Peninsula on a yacht toward Aruba and then to Colombia. The attorney general and another 64 Venezuelan prosecutors were prohibited from leaving the country.

In October 2017 attorney general Ortega Díaz made public a video where Euzenando Prazeres de Azevedo, the former director of Odebrecht in Venezuela, declared before the Attorney General's Office of Brazil that Maduro had received US$35 million to finance his presidential campaign in 2013. In the recording, Euzenando Prazeres de Azevedo says that Américo Mata, whom he identified as a representative of Maduro, contacted him to request money for Maduro's campaign.

==== Trial of Nicolás Maduro ====
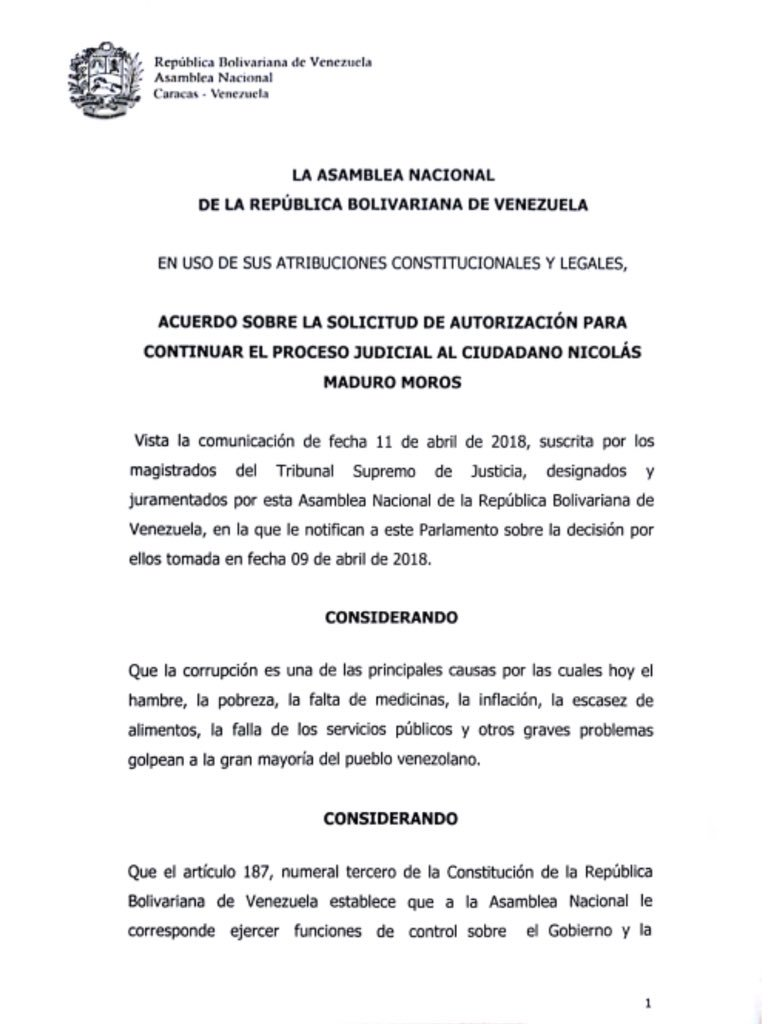
Approval of the judicial process against Nicolás Maduro by the National Assembly on 17 April 2018.

Final act of 23 August where Nicolás Maduro is sentenced to 18 years in prison.

On 22 February 2018, the magistrates of the Full Chamber of the Supreme Tribunal of Justice of Venezuela in exile admitted the request for a preliminary hearing presented by attorney general Luisa Ortega Díaz against Nicolás Maduro for the crimes of corruption and money laundering related to the payment of bribes allegedly made by the company Odebrecht to several Venezuelan politicians with the purpose of obtaining contracts in major public works. Luisa Ortega stated that in an investigation carried out by her office it was possible to verify that in 2012 the presidential campaign of Hugo Chávez was paid for by Odebrecht and the money was received by Maduro, who served as foreign minister.

On 28 March the Supreme Tribunal notified Nicolás Maduro to appear on 3 April at a preliminary hearing for corruption accusations related to the Odebrecht case. In the face of his nonappearance, the Supreme Tribunal proceeded to appoint trial lawyer Andrés Felipe Lindo as public defender, in order to guarantee the right to defense. On 9 April the tribunal admitted the preliminary hearing against Maduro requested by the attorney general, ordering preventive detention against the president and requesting a red notice from Interpol against him.

On 17 April the National Assembly approved with 105 votes in favor, from the opposition bloc, and two against, Juan Marín (PSUV) and Ilenia Medina (PPT) from the ruling party, the continuation of the trial against president Nicolás Maduro for corruption in response to the request submitted by the magistrates of the Supreme Tribunal. The agreement voted on by the deputies established declaring that sufficient merits exist to continue the judicial process and continue with the investigations carried out in the National Assembly in accordance with Article 187 of the constitution for acts of corruption that could derive from Maduro. The vote was carried out nominally and the leadership of the assembly decided to approve the trial with a simple majority; that is, 84 votes, based on Article 89 of the Parliament's Internal Rules and Debates Regulations. The leader of the bloc of the Democratic Unity Roundtable (MUD), Juan Guaidó, read the report in which president Nicolás Maduro approved 30 billion dollars for the execution of works in charge of Odebrecht that were halted or unfinished. By orders of colonel Bladimir Lugo of the Bolivarian National Guard (GNB), the media were unable to enter the Legislative Palace; the colonel kept journalists waiting for more than one hour at the San Francisco corner to finally decide that they would not have access.

On 3 May 2018 the Supreme Tribunal declared Maduro suspended as president and ordered his disqualification from any other public office. OAS secretary general Luis Almagro recognized Maduro's disqualification and suspension as president. The political party Vente Venezuela published a statement supporting the tribunal's decision, stating that "it ratifies that Maduro cannot be a candidate in any election" and that with this decision it corresponds to the National Assembly to begin a new process "to occupy that vacuum and advance in the restoration of democratic order in the country". The suspension from office and detention order was also supported by the Federation of Law Students of Venezuela (Fedeve), which rejected "the persecution and abuses carried out by the repressive dictatorship against the magistrates of the Supreme Tribunal of Justice (TSJ) in exile, and consequently against their relatives in Venezuela" in a statement, and its members demanded that the competent international organizations take pertinent actions in response to such acts.

On 15 August, the Supreme Tribunal sentenced Nicolás Maduro to 18 years and 3 months in prison in Ramo Verde prison for the corruption crimes imputed to him, in addition to ordering him to pay 35 billion dollars for the damage to the country's public patrimony. The sentence has not yet been carried out, since the Maduro government only recognizes the Supreme Tribunal of Justice of Venezuela.

== Foreign policy ==
The foreign policy of Maduro's second term was characterized by the continuation of alliances with Cuba, Nicaragua, Russia, China, Iran, and Turkey, alongside the severance of diplomatic relations with Argentina, Bolivia (restored in 2020), Brazil (restored in 2022), Colombia (restored in 2022), El Salvador, the United States, Guatemala and Paraguay.

=== Americas ===
==== Argentina ====
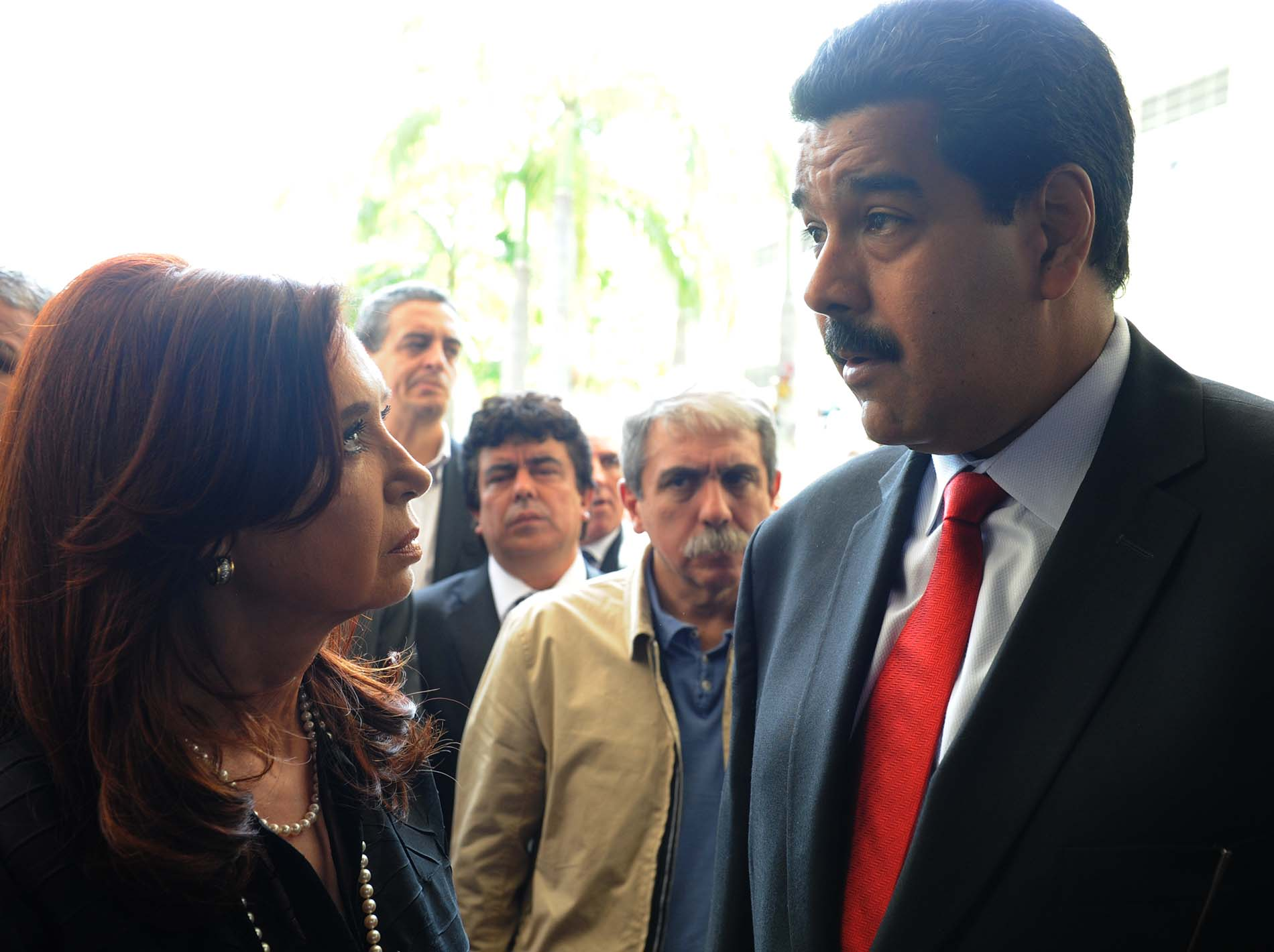
Cristina Fernández de Kirchner and Nicolás Maduro at Chávez's funeral.

In December 2023 it became known that the government of Javier Milei would not appoint an ambassador to Venezuela. Milei did not invite Maduro to his inauguration.

After a Venezuelan Boeing 747 aircraft in Buenos Aires was seized and handed over to the United States in 2024 because, according to the United States Department of Justice, it had been sold by the Iranian company Mahan Air, which was sanctioned by U.S. authorities, Maduro declared on television on 15 February 2024 that "the bandit Milei stole Venezuela's plane" and that "he pretends to be crazy or he is crazy or both at the same time".

On 18 July 2024 Nicolás Maduro called Javier Milei a "bastard" and accused him of being involved in an alleged plot to suspend the presidential elections. One day later, the Argentine Foreign Ministry informed the International Criminal Court (ICC) of Argentina's return to the trial concerning human rights in the country due to the "deterioration of the political and human rights situation in Venezuela". On 22 July Argentine presidential spokesman Manuel Adorni declared: "Maduro is a figure who has become, or perhaps always was, a dictator".

On 23 July 2024 former Peronist president Alberto Fernández confirmed his participation as an electoral observer, declaring that he would meet with opposition leaders to "listen to their concerns" and reiterated that "if (Nicolás Maduro) is defeated, what he has to do is accept it". The following day Fernández confirmed that his invitation had been cancelled because his statements "caused discomfort and generated doubts about my impartiality"; Fernández protested the decision and criticised that his opinion coincided with Brazilian president Lula Da Silva's criticism of Maduro's statements about a possible "bloodbath" following an eventual electoral defeat. Chilean president Gabriel Boric supported him.

Following the presidential elections, the Argentine Foreign Ministry issued a statement that day together with the foreign ministers of Costa Rica, Ecuador, Panama, Paraguay, Peru and Uruguay, requesting guarantees that the government would respect the election results. President Milei declared "Dictator Maduro, out", establishing that "Argentina is not going to recognise another fraud" and asking "that the Armed Forces this time defend democracy and the popular will". Former president Mauricio Macri said "Maduro must leave power. Now Venezuela's Armed Forces have the opportunity to stand on the right side of history".

Pedro Urruchurtu, a political asylum seeker in the Argentine embassy in Venezuela, denounced a siege by hooded individuals at the ambassador's residence that day, where five more dissidents from Maduro's government were taking refuge. On the same day, in Argentina, Venezuelan ambassador Stella Lugo accused Security Minister Patricia Bullrich of being "interventionist" following her support for Venezuelan migrants who voted and awaited the results of the presidential elections on 28 July.

On 29 July Maduro's government ordered the expulsion from the country of the diplomatic staff of the Argentine Embassy in Venezuela, accusing it of interventionism following statements by Milei's government regarding its refusal to recognise the results announced by Elvis Amoroso on behalf of the CNE after the opposition denounced fraud; it later cut off electricity and water at the embassy. The Argentine Foreign Ministry condemned the "harassment" of its embassy. The Socialist International condemned the expulsion of the Argentine diplomatic corps and President Lula reiterated to Maduro that guaranteeing the security of the embassy was his responsibility. The foreign ministers of Argentina and Brazil agreed that Lula's government would take charge of Argentina's interests in Venezuela, including its embassy, beginning on 1 August.

Following the ruling of the TSJ on 22 August endorsing Nicolás Maduro's victory for his third term, the governments of Argentina, Chile, Costa Rica, Ecuador, the United States, Guatemala, Panama, Paraguay, Peru, the Dominican Republic and Uruguay issued a statement the following day rejecting the ruling. That day a Venezuelan employee of the Argentine embassy was detained by the Sebin and released the following day after diplomatic efforts.

Nicolás Maduro's government stated in a communiqué that Venezuela had been "forced" to make the decision to revoke Brazil's permission because of alleged "terrorist activities" and "attempts at assassination against Nicolás Maduro".

==== Bolivia ====
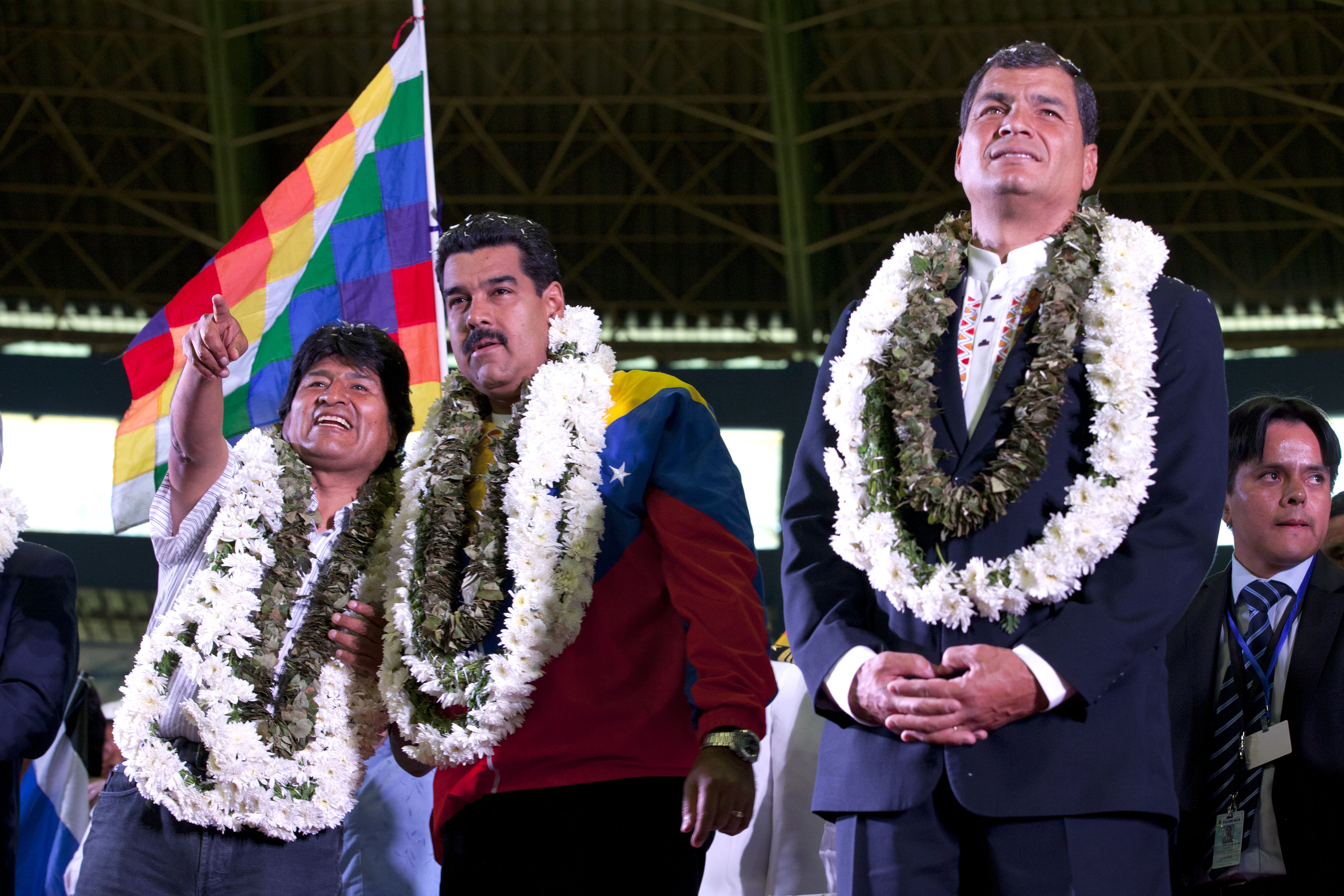
Evo Morales, Nicolás Maduro and Rafael Correa.

President Jeanine Áñez announced the severance of relations with Venezuela in 2019. Relations were restored the following year after the arrival of Luis Arce to the presidency.

Former president Jorge Quiroga, who was going to serve as an international observer in the 2024 presidential elections, was prevented from travelling to the country from Panama on 26 July of that year after Venezuelan airspace was blocked to his plane, which carried other Latin American former presidents and ordinary passengers. The government of Luis Arce recognised Nicolás Maduro as the winner of the elections and congratulated him.

==== Brazil ====
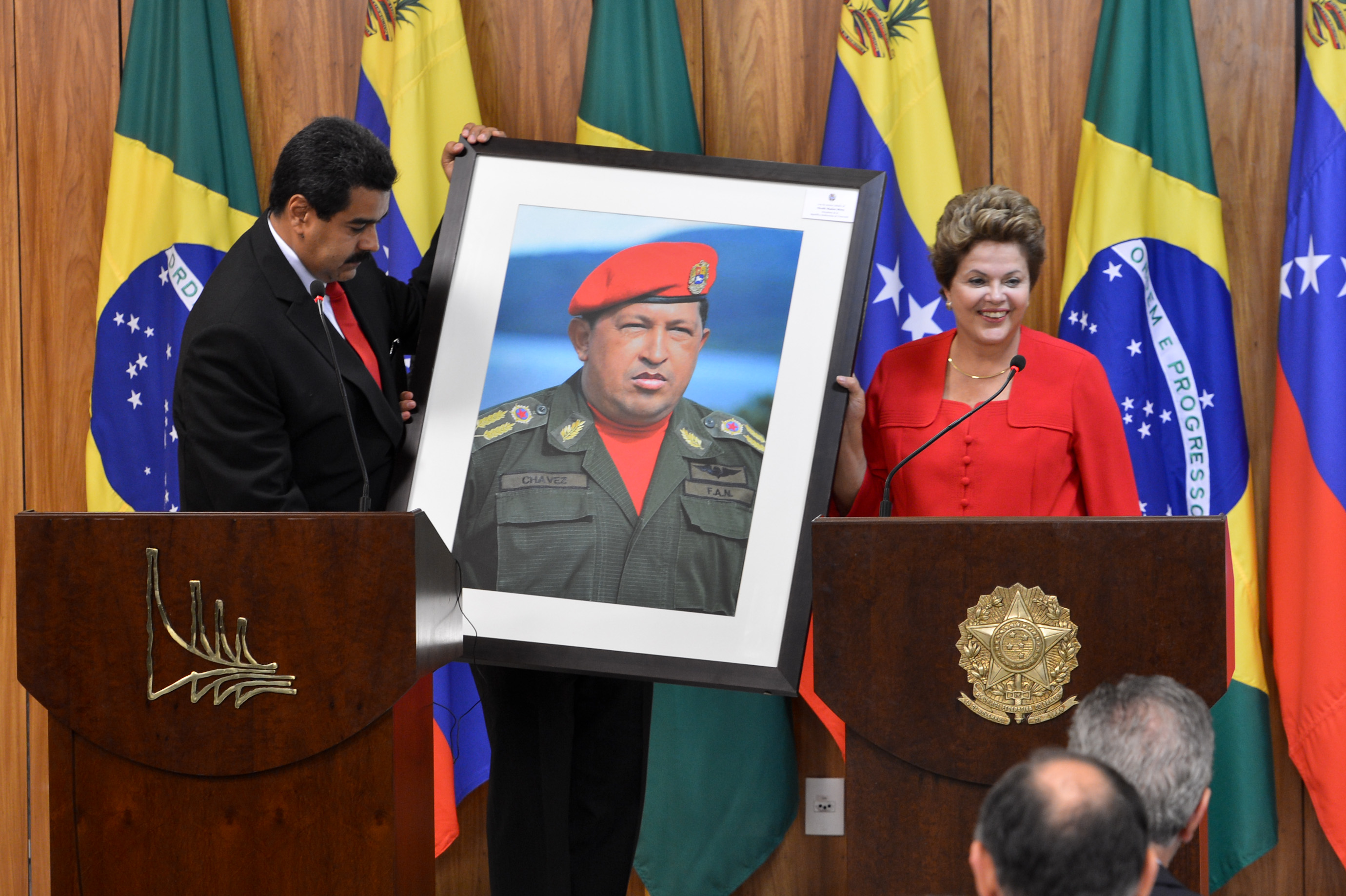
Brazilian President Dilma Rousseff receiving a photograph of Hugo Chávez from Maduro, 9 May 2013

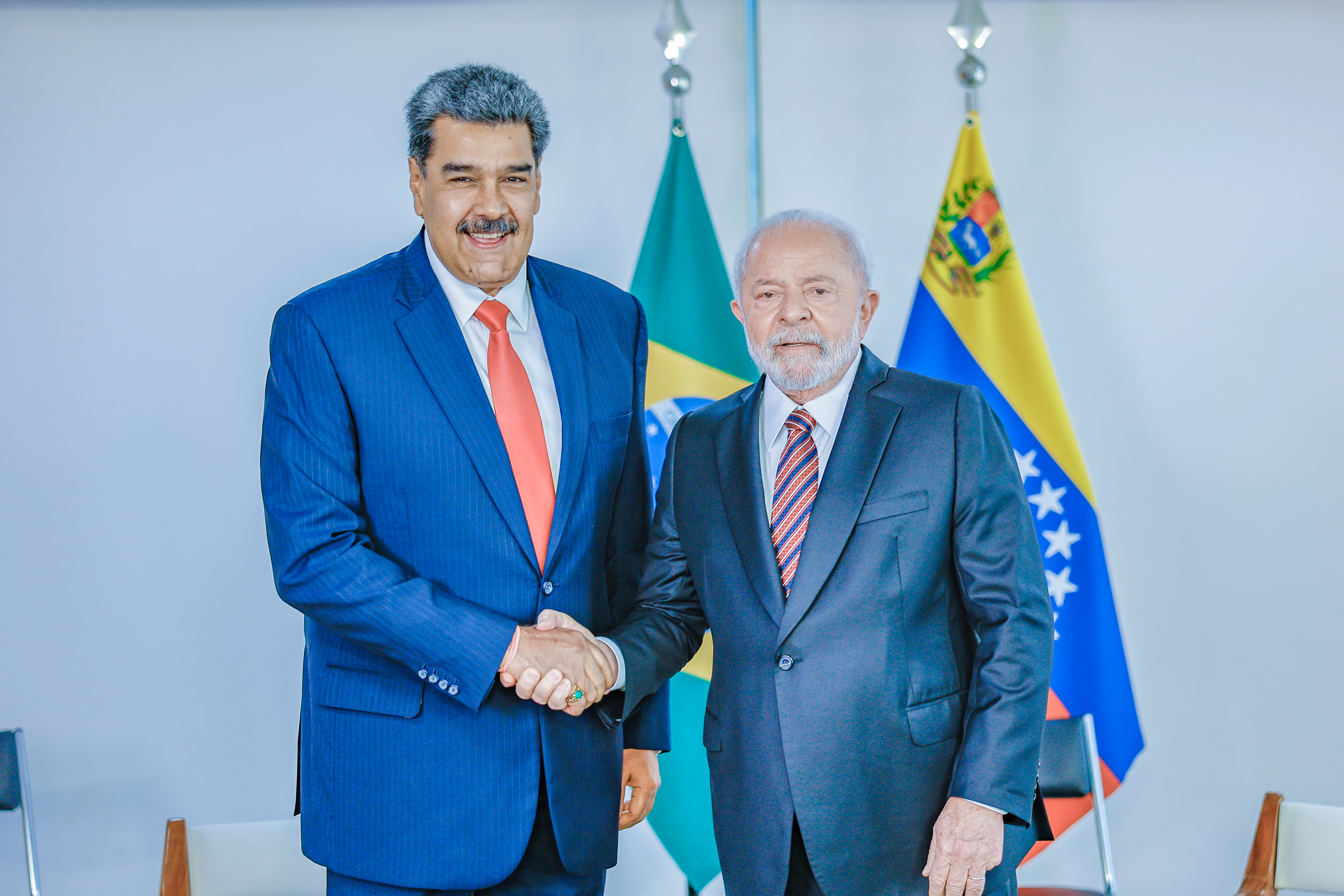
Maduro with Brazilian President Luiz Inácio Lula da Silva in Brasília, Brazil, 29 May 2023

Venezuela-Brazil relations have swung from amicable during the leftist administrations of Luiz Inácio Lula da Silva (2003–2010; 2023–present) and Dilma Rousseff (2010–2016), to antagonistic during the right-wing administrations of Michel Temer (2016–2019) and Jair Bolsonaro (2019–2023).

On 14 January 2019, days after Brazil recognized Venezuelan opposition leader Juan Guaidó as the country's interim president, Maduro called Brazilian President Jair Bolsonaro "a Hitler of the modern era".

==== Chile ====
Between 2018 and 2023 Chile did not appoint any ambassador to Venezuela, until president Gabriel Boric appointed Jaime Gazmuri in May 2023. Boric asked the United States and the European Union to lift the economic sanctions against Venezuela. Boric opposed Brazilian president Lula Da Silva's statement in May 2023 that "authoritarianism (in Venezuela) is a narrative construction", saying "I have had the opportunity to see (that reality) in the eyes and pain of hundreds of thousands of Venezuelans who today are in our homeland and who also demand a firm and clear position".

Following the kidnapping and murder of former Venezuelan serviceman Ronald Ojeda, a political dissident granted asylum in Chile, in February 2024, relations between both countries deteriorated. Chilean prosecutor Héctor Barros determined in April that so far the only possible motive was political due to the victim's profile as an active dissident. He declared Walter Rodríguez, whose fingerprint was found on Ojeda's mobile phone, and Maickel Villegas, who took his family out of Chile one month before the former lieutenant's murder, as suspects. In June, Venezuelan prosecutor Tarek William Saab described the crime as a "false flag operation", remarks that Foreign Minister Alberto van Klaveren described as "unacceptable".

Following Nicolás Maduro's statements on the eve of the presidential elections regarding the possibility of a "bloodbath" in the country if he lost the elections, Gabriel Boric declared: "One cannot threaten bloodbaths under any circumstances", calling for respect for the popular will. After the elections, Boric did not recognise the electoral results declaring Maduro the winner, considering them "difficult to believe", and requested transparency regarding the tally sheets and electoral process. On 29 July Maduro's government ordered the expulsion from the country of the diplomatic staff of the Chilean Embassy in Venezuela, accusing it of interventionism following statements by Boric's government. The Socialist International condemned the expulsion of the Chilean diplomatic corps. Following the ruling of the TSJ on 22 August endorsing Nicolás Maduro's victory for his third term, Boric declared that "Today Venezuela's TSJ finishes consolidating the fraud. Maduro's regime obviously welcomes its ruling, which will be marked by infamy" and clarified that "Venezuela's dictatorship is not the left".

==== Colombia ====
===== Government of Juan Manuel Santos =====
In 2014 Nicolás Maduro's government accused Juan Manuel Santos' government of being behind the protests of that year.

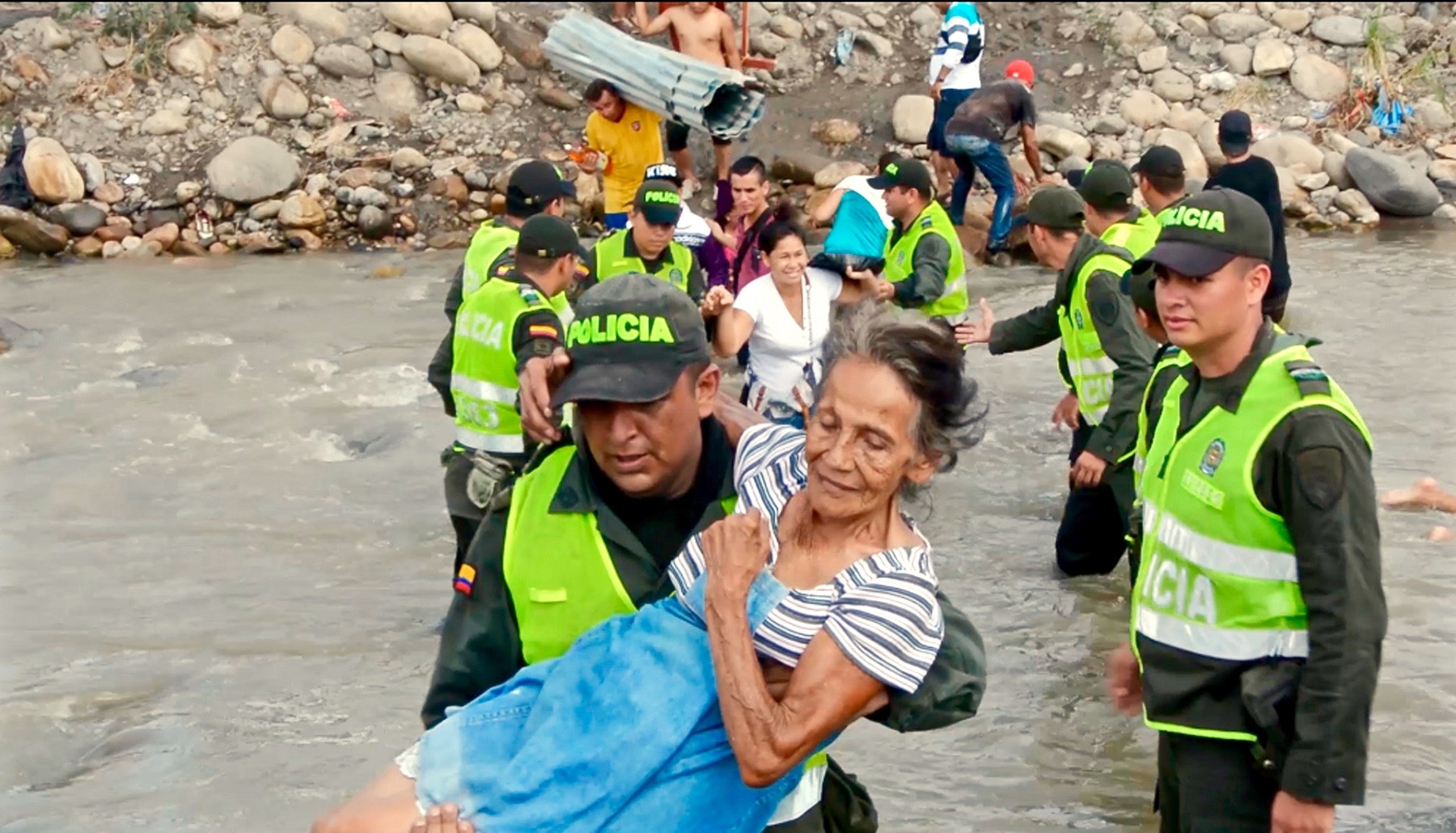
An elderly Colombian refugee transported by the National Police of Colombia across the Táchira River from Venezuela to Colombia.

In 2015 the government responded to the murder of three Venezuelan soldiers on the border with Colombia by establishing a state of emergency, during which 1,012 Colombians were deported and 10 alleged paramilitaries from that country were captured, according to statements by then-governor José Vielma Mora, with estimates of around 20,000 undocumented Colombians displaced by government policies intended to secure control of the border.

In 2018 Nicolás Maduro's government accused Juan Manuel Santos' government of being behind the attack of that year against him.

===== Government of Iván Duque =====
Venezuela and Colombia broke diplomatic relations in February 2019 after Colombia recognised Juan Guaidó as president. Venezuela gave Colombian diplomats 24 hours to leave the country.

===== Government of Gustavo Petro =====
Relations between both countries were restored in 2022 after the arrival of Gustavo Petro to the presidency.

In March 2024 Colombia's Foreign Ministry expressed "concern" regarding the "difficulties faced by major sectors of the opposition" in nominating their candidates, in reference to Corina Yoris. Foreign Minister Yván Gil responded: "Driven by the need to satisfy the wishes of the U.S. State Department, Colombia's Foreign Ministry takes a false step and commits a gross act of interference in matters that concern only Venezuelans".

On 2 April 2024 Petro described the disqualification of María Corina Machado as a "democratic coup". On 10 April Maduro and Petro met.

Petro proposed an agreement on democratic guarantees between the government and the opposition; Colombian Foreign Minister Luis Gilberto Murillo expressed the Colombian government's intention to ensure that Venezuela could have a peaceful transition after the elections. Former vice president Diosdado Cabello responded: "Who sent you to say that? Your president of Colombia or your president of the United States? Who do you work for? Who gives you the right to speak about transition in Venezuela?", stating that the only transition that would come to Venezuela would be "the transition to socialism". Colombia did not officially respond to Cabello; however, when questioned on the matter, Murillo stated: "To foolish words, deaf ears".

Former Colombian vice president Marta Lucía Ramírez, who was going to serve as an international observer in the 2024 presidential elections, was prevented from travelling to the country from Panama on 26 July of that year after Venezuelan airspace was blocked to her plane, which also carried other Latin American former presidents and ordinary passengers, causing her and the others to disembark so that the aircraft could continue without restrictions.

Foreign Minister Luis Gilberto Murillo declared that "We call for the total counting of votes, their verification and an independent audit to proceed as soon as possible", requesting that "any doubts regarding the results be dispelled". Former president Andrés Pastrana declared: "In Venezuela there was not electoral fraud, but rather a coup d'état through the disregard of the popular will!".

==== Costa Rica ====
Former Costa Rican president Miguel Ángel Rodríguez, who was going to serve as an international observer in the 2024 presidential elections, was prevented from travelling to the country from Panama on 26 July of that year after Venezuelan airspace was blocked to his plane, which carried other Latin American former presidents and ordinary passengers, causing him and the others to disembark so that the aircraft could continue without restrictions.

Following the presidential elections, Costa Rica's Foreign Ministry issued a statement together with the foreign ministers of Argentina, Ecuador, Panama, Paraguay, Peru and Uruguay, requesting guarantees that the government would respect the election results.

Following the Venezuelan elections, president Rodrigo Chaves declared that "The government of Costa Rica categorically repudiates the proclamation of Nicolás Maduro as president of the Bolivarian Republic of Venezuela, which we consider fraudulent". On 29 July Maduro's government ordered the expulsion from the country of the diplomatic staff of the Costa Rican Embassy in Venezuela. The Socialist International condemned the expulsion of the Costa Rican diplomatic corps. On 31 July Costa Rica offered political asylum to Edmundo González Urrutia and María Corina Machado, leaders of the opposition to the government, an option they appreciated but declined.

On 2 August 2024 Chaves' government recognised Edmundo González Urrutia as president-elect. Following the ruling of the TSJ on 22 August endorsing Nicolás Maduro's victory for his third term, the governments of Argentina, Chile, Costa Rica, Ecuador, the United States, Guatemala, Panama, Paraguay, Peru, the Dominican Republic and Uruguay issued a statement the following day rejecting the ruling.

==== Ecuador ====
===== Government of Lenín Moreno =====
In 2018, after Jorge Rodríguez called president Lenín Moreno a "liar" and accused him of "inflating" the figures of Venezuelan emigrants, Venezuelan ambassador Carol Delgado was given 72 hours to leave the country, which was reciprocated in Venezuela with the expulsion of Ecuador's chargé d'affaires.

In 2019 Lenín Moreno accused former president Rafael Correa and Nicolás Maduro of conspiring against him and of being behind the social unrest in Ecuador, describing it as an "attempted coup d'état". Following this, Correa clarified that he had been in Venezuela working as a consultant for Maduro's government.

===== Government of Daniel Noboa =====
In April 2024, following the raid by Daniel Noboa's government on the Mexican embassy in Ecuador, Maduro's government announced the closure of Venezuela's embassy in Ecuador as well as its consulates in the country. On 18 July 2024 Maduro accused Noboa of being behind an alleged plan to suspend the presidential elections in Venezuela.

Following the Venezuelan presidential elections, Ecuador's Foreign Ministry issued a statement together with the foreign ministers of Argentina, Costa Rica, Panama, Paraguay, Peru and Uruguay, requesting guarantees that the government would respect the election results.

Ecuador's Foreign Ministry rejected the results declaring Maduro the winner because of their "lack of transparency"; for the country, the "lack of guarantees" in the vote-counting process "delegitimises and taints the election results". President Noboa declared that he had asked Foreign Minister Gabriela Sommerfeld to convene the Permanent Council of the OAS to address the "delicate situation Venezuela is experiencing", adding that this was "the danger of dictatorship". On 2 August Noboa's government recognised Edmundo González Urrutia as president-elect. Following the ruling of the TSJ on 22 August endorsing Nicolás Maduro's victory for his third term, the governments of Argentina, Chile, Costa Rica, Ecuador, the United States, Guatemala, Panama, Paraguay, Peru, the Dominican Republic and Uruguay issued a statement the following day rejecting the ruling.

==== El Salvador ====
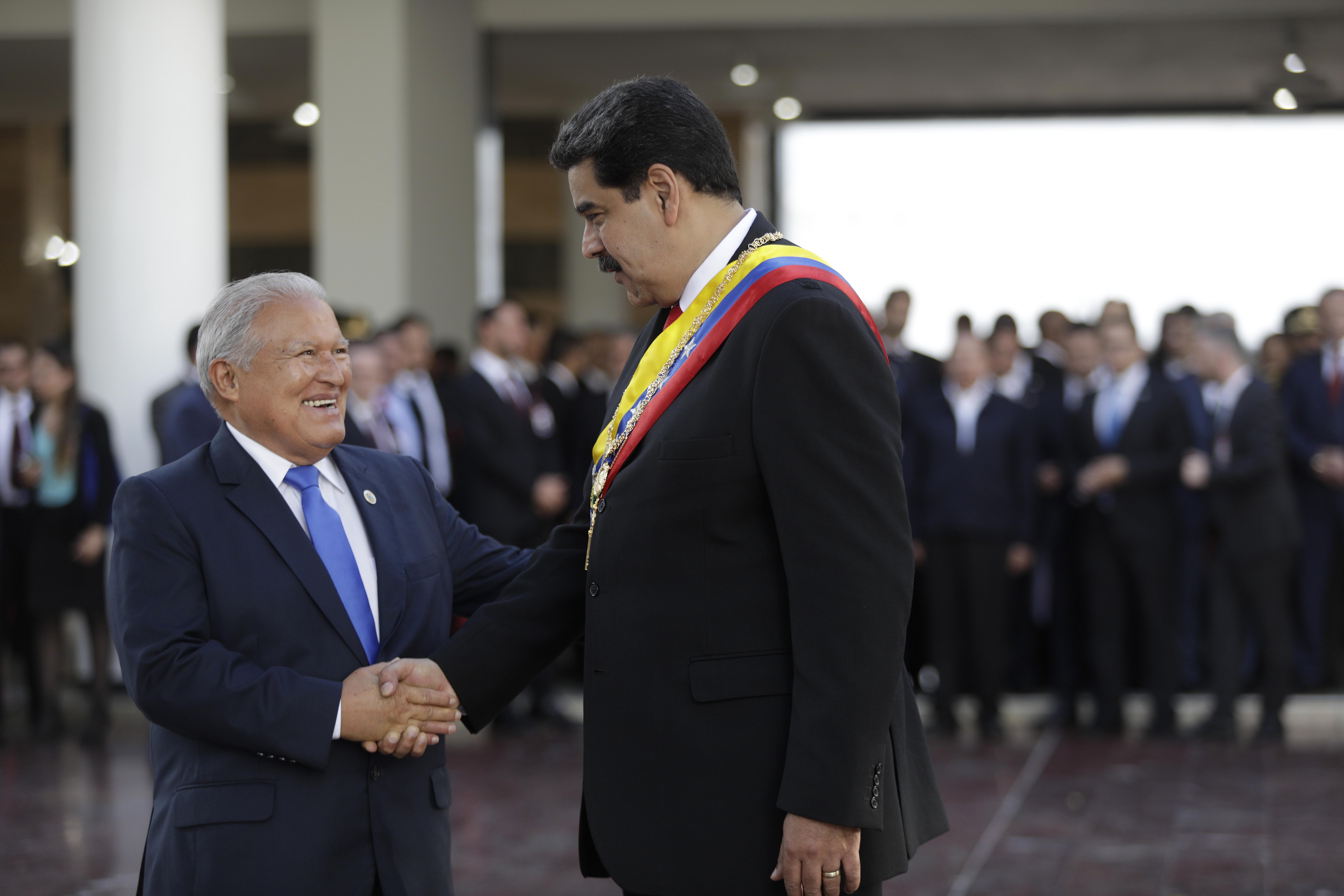
Nicolás Maduro and Salvador Sánchez Cerén in 2019.

Nicolás Maduro expelled the Salvadoran diplomatic corps, which was reciprocated by president Nayib Bukele with the expulsion of all representatives of the Venezuelan embassy in the country.

==== Guatemala ====
President Alejandro Giammattei closed Guatemala's embassy in Caracas in 2020 and broke diplomatic relations with Nicolás Maduro's government.

Following the results of the 2024 presidential elections, president Bernardo Arévalo wrote on the social network X that "Venezuela deserves transparent, accurate electoral results in accordance with the will of its people" and that "we received the results announced by the CNE with many doubts. Therefore, the reports of the electoral observation missions are indispensable and, today more than ever, they must defend the votes of Venezuelans". Following the ruling of the TSJ on 22 August endorsing Nicolás Maduro's victory for his third term, the governments of Argentina, Chile, Costa Rica, Ecuador, the United States, Guatemala, Panama, Paraguay, Peru, the Dominican Republic and Uruguay issued a statement the following day rejecting the ruling.

==== Honduras ====
In 2019 Honduras withdrew its chargé d'affaires in Caracas and recognised Juan Guaidó as president. Both countries broke relations until 2022, when they were resumed. The government of Xiomara Castro recognised Nicolás Maduro as the winner of the 2024 presidential elections, congratulating him.

==== Mexico ====
===== Government of Enrique Peña Nieto =====
After Maduro's election as president in April 2013, the government of Enrique Peña Nieto further emphasised the close ties between both countries and the willingness to overcome differences regarding political structures. However, in January 2015 Maduro accused former Mexican president Felipe Calderón Hinojosa (Peña Nieto's predecessor) of conspiring with the Venezuelan opposition to overthrow his government. In 2017 Maduro expressed support for Peña Nieto during the diplomatic crisis with the government of Donald Trump regarding issues such as the border wall and the renegotiation of NAFTA.

===== Government of Andrés Manuel López Obrador =====
Following Andrés Manuel López Obrador's victory in July 2018, president Maduro travelled to Mexico to attend the inauguration in December of that same year. On 23 January 2019 López Obrador's government reiterated Mexico's traditional stance of non-intervention in the affairs of other countries, supporting Maduro's government by refusing to recognise Juan Guaidó as president of Venezuela.

Former president Vicente Fox, who was going to serve as an international observer in the Venezuelan presidential elections, was prevented from travelling to the country from Panama on 26 July of that year after Venezuelan airspace was blocked to his plane, which carried other Latin American former presidents and ordinary passengers, causing him and the others to disembark so that the aircraft could continue without restrictions.

==== Panama ====
===== Government of Ricardo Martinelli =====
In March 2014 Nicolás Maduro announced the severance of diplomatic relations with Panama after the latter country requested that the Permanent Council of the Organization of American States (OAS) convene a meeting of foreign ministers regarding the situation in Venezuela.

===== Government of Juan Carlos Varela =====
Panama designated Maduro and other Venezuelan officials as "high-risk" subjects for money laundering. Nicolás Maduro responded on 5 April 2018 by declaring sanctions against Panamanian companies, as well as against the president of Panama, Juan Carlos Varela, and other businessmen. The crisis ended on 26 April when Maduro announced that he had spoken by telephone with Varela and they agreed on the return of ambassadors and the restoration of air communication between both countries.

===== Government of José Raúl Mulino =====
On 26 July 2024 a Copa Airlines aircraft was prevented from travelling from Panama to Venezuela after Venezuelan airspace was blocked because of the presence of former presidents Mireya Moscoso (Panama), Vicente Fox (Mexico), Miguel Ángel Rodríguez (Costa Rica) and Jorge Quiroga (Bolivia), and former Colombian vice president Marta Lucía Ramírez, who were going to serve as international observers in the 2024 presidential elections. The politicians disembarked so that the aircraft could continue without restrictions.

Following the 2024 Venezuelan presidential elections, Panama's Foreign Ministry issued a statement together with the foreign ministers of Argentina, Costa Rica, Ecuador, Paraguay, Peru and Uruguay, requesting guarantees that the government would respect the election results. The following day, on 29 July, president Mulino announced the suspension of relations between both countries after rejecting and denouncing irregularities regarding the announcement of Maduro's presidential victory. On 29 July Maduro's government ordered the expulsion from the country of the diplomatic staff of the Panamanian Embassy in Venezuela. The Socialist International condemned the expulsion of the Panamanian diplomatic corps.

On 2 August 2024 president Mulino announced that Panama was joining the recognition of Edmundo González Urrutia as president-elect. Following the ruling of the TSJ on 22 August endorsing Nicolás Maduro's victory for his third term, the governments of Argentina, Chile, Costa Rica, Ecuador, the United States, Guatemala, Panama, Paraguay, Peru, the Dominican Republic and Uruguay issued a statement the following day rejecting the ruling.

==== Paraguay ====
On 10 January 2019 the government of Mario Abdo Benítez broke relations with Venezuela and closed the Paraguayan embassy in Caracas. Relations were restored in November 2023 following the arrival of Santiago Peña.

Following the 2024 presidential elections, Paraguay's Foreign Ministry issued a statement together with the foreign ministers of Argentina, Costa Rica, Ecuador, Panama, Peru and Uruguay, requesting guarantees that the government would respect the election results.

==== Peru ====
The government of Nicolás Maduro and the government of Dina Boluarte experienced diplomatic friction after the National Police of Peru injured members of Venezuela's national football team during the match between both countries held in Lima in 2023 and the Venezuelan team's aircraft was denied fuel for several hours without any apparent reason.

Following the presidential elections, Peru's Foreign Ministry issued a statement together with the foreign ministers of Argentina, Costa Rica, Ecuador, Panama, Paraguay and Uruguay, requesting guarantees that the government would respect the election results.

After the results of the 2024 presidential elections, Peruvian foreign minister Javier González-Olaechea declared that Peru "will not accept the violation of the popular will of the Venezuelan people", rejecting the results. On 29 July Maduro's government ordered the expulsion from the country of the diplomatic staff of the Peruvian Embassy in Venezuela. The Socialist International condemned the expulsion of the Peruvian diplomatic corps. Following the results published by the Democratic Unitary Platform, which contradicted those of the CNE, Peru recognised Edmundo González Urrutia as president-elect. Following the ruling of the TSJ on 22 August endorsing Nicolás Maduro's victory for his third term, the governments of Argentina, Chile, Costa Rica, Ecuador, the United States, Guatemala, Panama, Paraguay, Peru, the Dominican Republic and Uruguay issued a statement the following day rejecting the ruling.

==== Dominican Republic ====
Following the 2024 presidential elections, the Dominican Foreign Ministry joined a statement together with the foreign ministers of Argentina, Costa Rica, Ecuador, Panama, Paraguay, Peru and Uruguay, requesting guarantees that the government would respect the election results. On 29 July Maduro's government ordered the expulsion from the country of the diplomatic staff of the Dominican Embassy in Venezuela. The Socialist International condemned the expulsion of the Dominican diplomatic corps. Following the ruling of the TSJ on 22 August endorsing Nicolás Maduro's victory for his third term, the governments of Argentina, Chile, Costa Rica, Ecuador, the United States, Guatemala, Panama, Paraguay, Peru, the Dominican Republic and Uruguay issued a statement the following day rejecting the ruling.

==== United States of America ====
Maduro accused the United States of intervention in Venezuela several times with his allegations ranging from post-election violence by "neo-Nazi groups", economic difficulties from what he called an "economic war" and various coup plots. The United States denied such accusations.

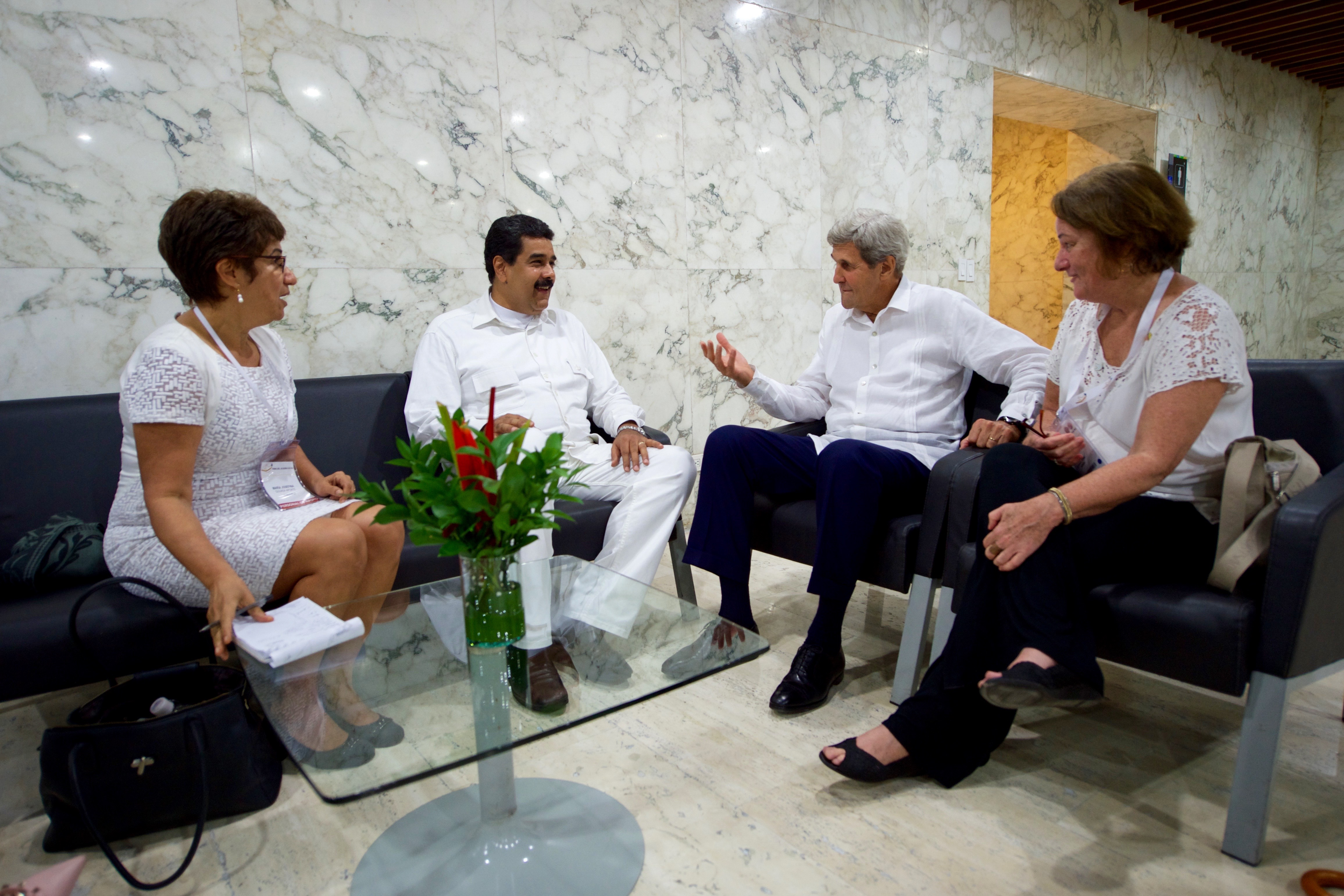
Maduro meeting with U.S. Secretary of State John Kerry, 26 September 2016

In early 2015 the Obama administration signed an executive order which imposed targeted sanctions on seven Venezuelan officials whom the White House argued were instrumental in human rights violations, persecution of political opponents and significant public corruption and said that the country posed an "unusual and extraordinary threat to the national security and foreign policy of the United States". Maduro responded to the sanctions in a couple of ways. He wrote an open letter in a full-page ad in The New York Times in March 2015, stating that Venezuelans were "friends of the American people" and called President Obama's action of making targeted sanctions on the alleged human rights abusers a "unilateral and aggressive measure". Examples of accusations of human rights abuses from the United States to Maduro's government included the murder of a political activist prior to legislative elections in Venezuela. Maduro threatened to sue the United States over an executive order issued by the Obama Administration that declared Venezuela to be a threat to American security. He also planned to deliver 10 million signatures, or signatures from about 1/3 of Venezuela's population, denouncing the United States' decree declaring the situation in Venezuela an "extraordinary threat to US national security". and ordered all schools in the country to hold an "anti-imperialist day" against the United States with the day's activities including the "collection of the signatures of the students, and teaching, administrative, maintenance and cooking personnel". Maduro further ordered state workers to apply their signatures in protest, with some workers reporting that firings of state workers occurred due to their rejection of signing the executive order protesting the "Obama decree". There were also reports that members of Venezuelan armed forces and their families were ordered to sign against the United States decree.

===== Proposed United States invasion of Venezuela =====
The possibility of a United States-led invasion of Venezuela has been frequently discussed during the presidencies of Donald Trump.

In 2017, during his first presidency, Trump said that he was "not going to rule out a military option" to address the worsening crisis in Venezuela. In 2025, during his second presidency, the United States surged military assets to the Caribbean as part of Operation Southern Spear, citing the fight against drug cartels as its stated objective. During this buildup, experts, analysts and current and former government officials stated that the assets deployed were insufficient for an invasion and that they viewed an invasion as unlikely.

In 2026, the United States launched Operation Absolute Resolve, conducting airstrikes on Venezuela and capturing President Nicolás Maduro and his wife Cilia Flores. This led to questions being raised about the possibility of long-term military intervention involving ground troops in Venezuela.

==== Uruguay ====
On 13 February 2024 president Luis Lacalle Pou said that it was "obvious" that in Venezuela "there is a dictatorship". On 17 February former president José Mujica declared: "The government of Venezuela is an authoritarian government, (Maduro) can be called a dictator".

Following the 2024 presidential elections, Uruguay's Foreign Ministry issued a statement together with the foreign ministers of Argentina, Costa Rica, Ecuador, Panama, Paraguay and Peru, requesting guarantees that the government would respect the election results. Following the results, president Luis Lacalle Pou declared that "The process up to election day and the counting process were clearly tainted. One cannot recognise a victory if there is no confidence in the methods and mechanisms used to achieve it" and that he would not recognise the CNE results declaring Nicolás Maduro the winner. On 29 July Maduro's government ordered the expulsion from the country of the diplomatic staff of the Uruguayan Embassy in Venezuela. The Socialist International condemned the events. On 2 August Lacalle Pou's government recognised Edmundo González Urrutia as president-elect. Following the ruling of the TSJ on 22 August endorsing Nicolás Maduro's victory for his third term, the governments of Argentina, Chile, Costa Rica, Ecuador, the United States, Guatemala, Panama, Paraguay, Peru, the Dominican Republic and Uruguay issued a statement the following day rejecting the ruling.

=== Europe ===
==== Spain ====
The Spanish government recognised Juan Guaidó as interim president of Venezuela in 2019, leaving the position of ambassador to Venezuela vacant from 2020 until 2022, when a new ambassador was appointed.

==== France ====
Nicolás Maduro concluded his 2017 international tour in France, meeting with president François Hollande.

==== Italy ====
Following the 2024 presidential elections in Venezuela, Italian foreign minister Antonio Tajani declared: "I have many doubts about the regular conduct of the elections in Venezuela", requesting "results that can be verified".

==== Portugal ====
On 30 March, at 00:45 hours (Venezuelan time), the Venezuelan coast guard vessel AB Naiguatá (GC-23) sighted the Portuguese cruise ship Resolute and ordered it to follow it to a Venezuelan port. The captain of the Resolute was consulting with his superiors when the Naiguatá deliberately collided with the cruise ship's bow with the apparent intention of diverting its course toward the Venezuelan coast. However, the Resolute was a ship with a reinforced hull designed for navigation in ice fields, causing the Naiguatá to take on water and eventually sink. Its crew was rescued by Venezuelan vessels, and the Resolute, which was not significantly damaged, after waiting in the area received instructions to head to Curaçao.

The Resolute, with its 32 crew members, had already been adrift for a day.

The government of Nicolás Maduro (partially recognised) denounced the incident, calling it an "act of international piracy", while the Bolivarian National Armed Forces likewise described the Portuguese cruise ship's "action" as "cowardly and criminal". The government of Portugal offered to assist in the investigations.

On 1 April, Curaçao reported that it had not had access to the Resolute. On 2 April, Nicolás Maduro stated that "someone from the north" was preventing Curaçao from investigating what had happened, in reference to the United States.

==== Russia ====
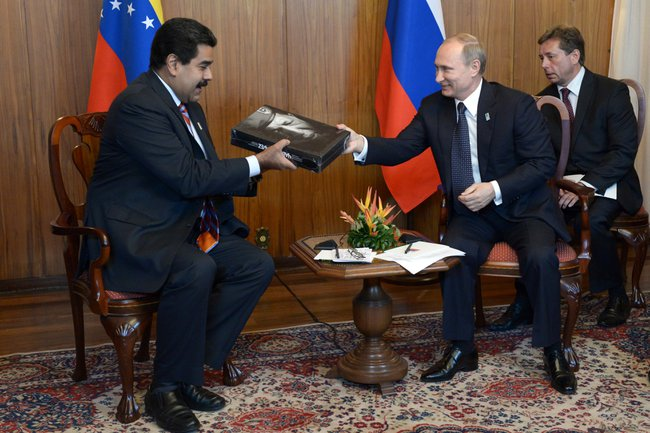
Nicolás Maduro and Vladimir Putin.

In 2015 Russian companies began leading international oil extraction in Venezuela, surpassing China.

In 2017 the Russian state-owned company Rosneft paid Venezuela an advance of 6 billion dollars for oil sales.

By 2020 the channel CNBC considered Russia Venezuela's principal geopolitical ally, and Russia's "most prominent" Latin American relationship was with Venezuela.

Due to the COVID-19 pandemic, an agreement was reached with Russia at the end of December 2020 for the delivery of 10 million units of Russian vaccines, beginning with 1.43 million first doses; by August 2021 the second dose had not arrived, despite the fact that the second dose was supposed to be administered after 21 days. Russia responded that it first had to meet the needs of the Russian population, which totalled 140 million people.

In February 2022 Nicolás Maduro expressed his "strong support" for Russia in its invasion of Ukraine during a telephone call with Vladimir Putin and condemned the sanctions imposed on Russia by Western nations.

=== Asia ===
==== China ====
Maduro reached out to China for economic assistance while China funneled billions of dollars from multiple loans into Venezuela. China is Venezuela's second largest trade partner with two-thirds of Venezuelan exports to China composed of oil. According to Mark Jones, a Latin American expert of the Baker Institute, China was "investing for strategic reasons" rather than ideological similarities. The Venezuelan military also used military equipment from China using the NORINCO VN-4 armoured vehicle against protesters during the 2014–15 Venezuelan protests, ordering hundreds more as a result of the demonstrations.

==== Iran ====
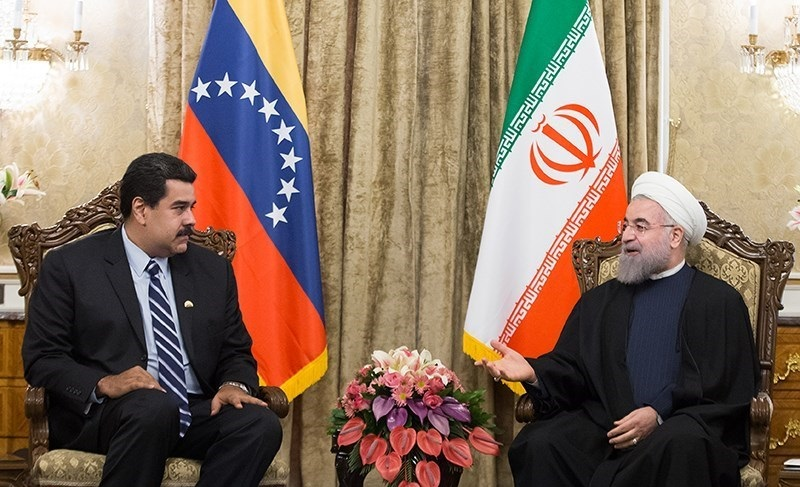
Nicolás Maduro and Hassan Rouhani.

Since 2020, during the fuel crisis in Venezuela, the government resorted to importing oil and refining supplies from Iran. Through an agreement, Maduro's government handed over the El Palito Refinery to Iran for the maintenance and restoration of production at the plant in May 2022. In June of that year, Nicolás Maduro and Ebrahim Raisi signed a 20-year cooperation agreement between Venezuela and Iran. At the end of July, it was reported that the government ceded one million hectares of arable land to the Iranian government. According to the constitution, this decision could not be implemented without consulting the population, in accordance with Article 13.

Iranian foreign minister Nasser Kanaani recognised Nicolás Maduro as the winner following the 2024 presidential elections, congratulating him.

==== Israel and Palestine ====
In the Israeli–Palestinian conflict, Maduro frequently supported the Palestinian cause in international forums including his stance that his country recognizes Jerusalem as the eternal capital of Palestine after the US embassy move to Jerusalem which he called an "extremist decision" that lacks legal validity and violates international law. In January 2019, Maduro reaffirms the unconditional support for the struggle of the Palestinians in defense of their sovereignty in accordance with the principles of the Charter of the United Nations and international law.

In December 2017, Maduro was invited as the special honorary guest at the Extraordinary Summit of the OIC (Organisation of Islamic Cooperation) in Istanbul, Turkey with the main issue being to unify the response of the Muslim world to the US embassy move to Jerusalem, which Maduro called a "colonial act."

==== Syria ====
Nicolás Maduro expressed support for the government of Bashar al-Assad in Syria on numerous occasions, opposing intervention in the country.

=== International organizations ===
==== UN ====
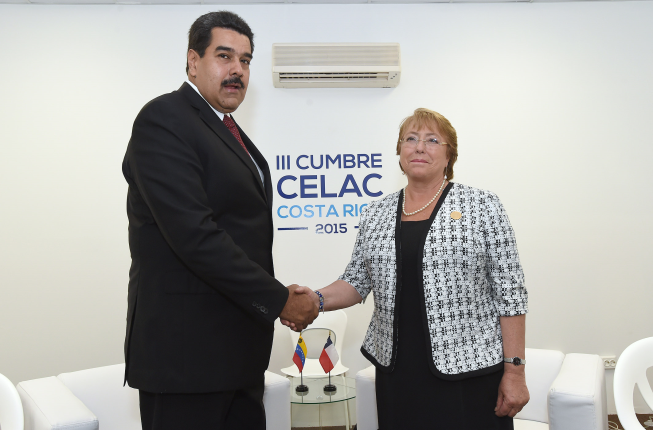
UN High Commissioner for Human Rights Michelle Bachelet led an investigation into Maduro's government that led to the dismantling of the FAES.

==== BRICS ====
The government of Nicolás Maduro intended for Venezuela to join the BRICS. In 2024 Brazil vetoed Venezuela's entry into BRICS after Venezuela refused to publish electoral tally sheets from the 2024 elections amid opposition allegations of electoral fraud. This was criticised by Maduro's government.

==== OAS ====
Minutes after Nicolás Maduro was sworn in, the Organization of American States, in an extraordinary meeting of its Permanent Council, approved a resolution declaring Maduro illegitimate as president of Venezuela and urging that new elections be called.

==== Declaration of Panama ====
On 6 April 2015, twenty-five (25) ex-presidents issued a Declaración de Panamá (Declaration of Panama), a statement denouncing the VII Cumbre de las Américas, what they called "democratic alteration" in Venezuela, promoted by the government of Nicolas Maduro. The statement calls for the immediate release of "political prisoners" in Venezuela. Among the former heads of government that have called for improvements in Venezuela are: Jorge Quiroga (Bolivia); Sebastián Piñera (Chile): Andrés Pastrana, Álvaro Uribe and Belisario Betancur (Colombia); Miguel Ángel Rodríguez, Rafael Ángel Calderón Guardia, Laura Chinchilla, Óscar Arias, Luis Alberto Monge (Costa Rica), Osvaldo Hurtado (Ecuador); Alfredo Cristiani and Armando Calderón (EL Salvador); José María Aznar (Spain); Felipe Calderón and Vicente Fox (México), Mireya Moscoso (Panamá), Alejandro Toledo (Perú) and Luis Alberto Lacalle (Uruguay).

==== Non-Aligned Movement ====
At the 17th Summit of the Non-Aligned Movement (NAM) in 2016, hosted by Venezuela at Margarita Island, Maduro was elected chairperson by acclamation, a position that he is to hold until the 18th Summit in Azerbaijan in 2019. Maduro's administration spent over US$120 million on the event, and Maduro billed it as a meeting that would "be remembered for centuries"; according to Al Jazeera, the "delegates who did come complained privately of a lack of organisation, delays and shabby hotels". The Maduro administration did not respond to a request from Al Jazeera for a list of delegations present; of the 120 NAM member states, media sources estimated between 10 and 15 heads of state attended, including Bolivia, Cuba, Ecuador, Palestine, Iran, Syria and Zimbabwe. For only the second time since NAM was founded, India did not attend; of the countries that did attend, many are recipients of Venezuelan oil subsidies, according to Foreign Policy and Fox News.

==== International Criminal Court investigation ====
An investigation by the International Criminal Court (ICC) to analyze possible crimes against humanity committed in Venezuela was opened in 2021. A preliminary examination was initially opened in 2006, and closed after concluding that the requirements to start an investigation had not been met. In February 2018, the ICC announced that it would open preliminary probes into alleged crimes against humanity performed by Venezuelan authorities since at least April 2017. In 2020, the Office of the Prosecutor of the ICC stated that it believed there was a "reasonable basis" to believe that "since at least April 2017, civilian authorities, members of the armed forces and pro-government individuals have committed the crimes against humanity", and on 2021 ICC Prosecutor Karim Khan announced the opening of an investigation regarding the situation in the country.

=== International trips ===
This list provides a summary of the official foreign visits made by Maduro as president of Venezuela.

Map of official foreign visits made by Nicolás Maduro as president of Venezuela

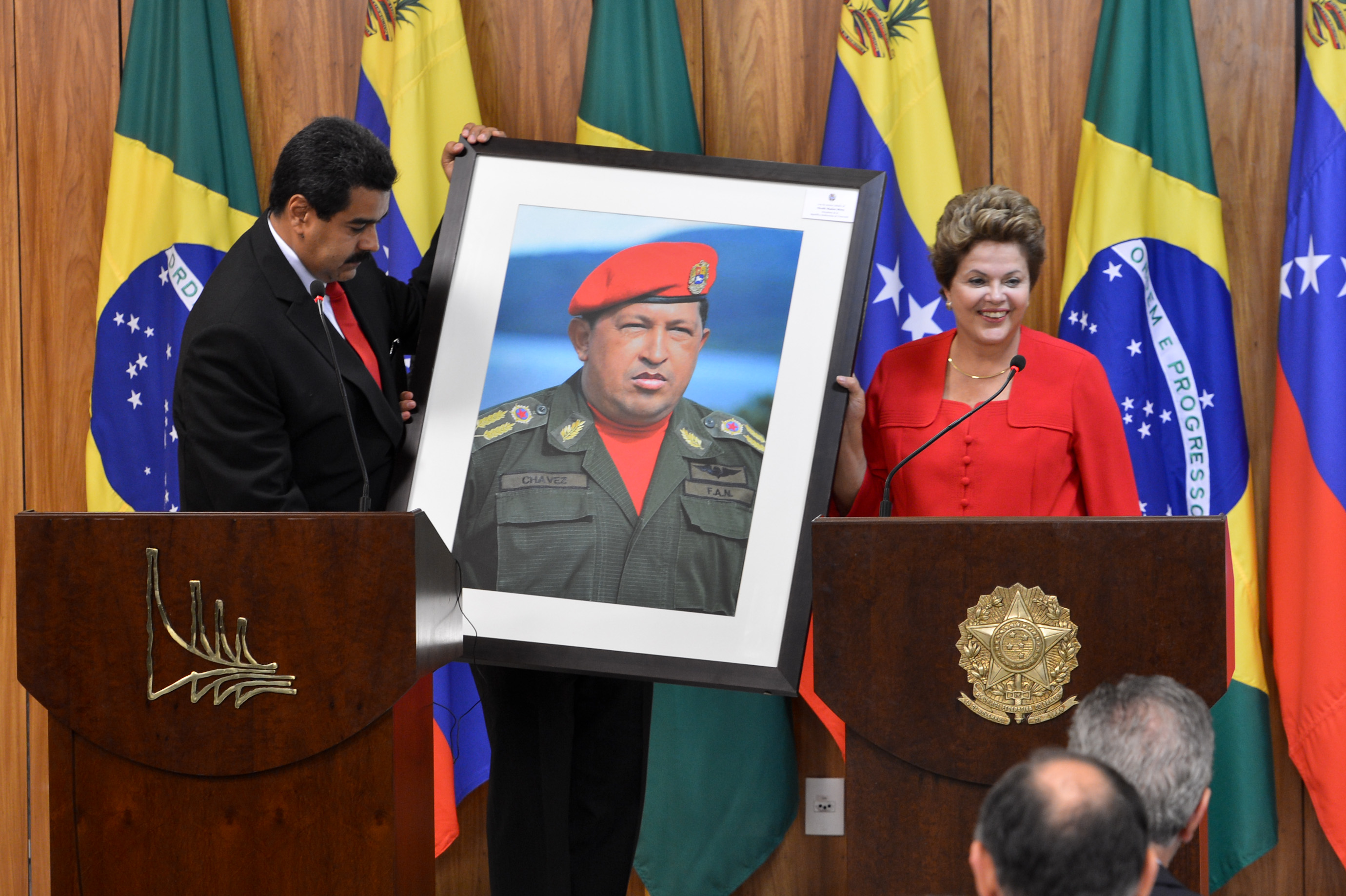
Nicolás Maduro on an official visit to Brazil, presenting a portrait of Chávez to Dilma Rousseff in 2013

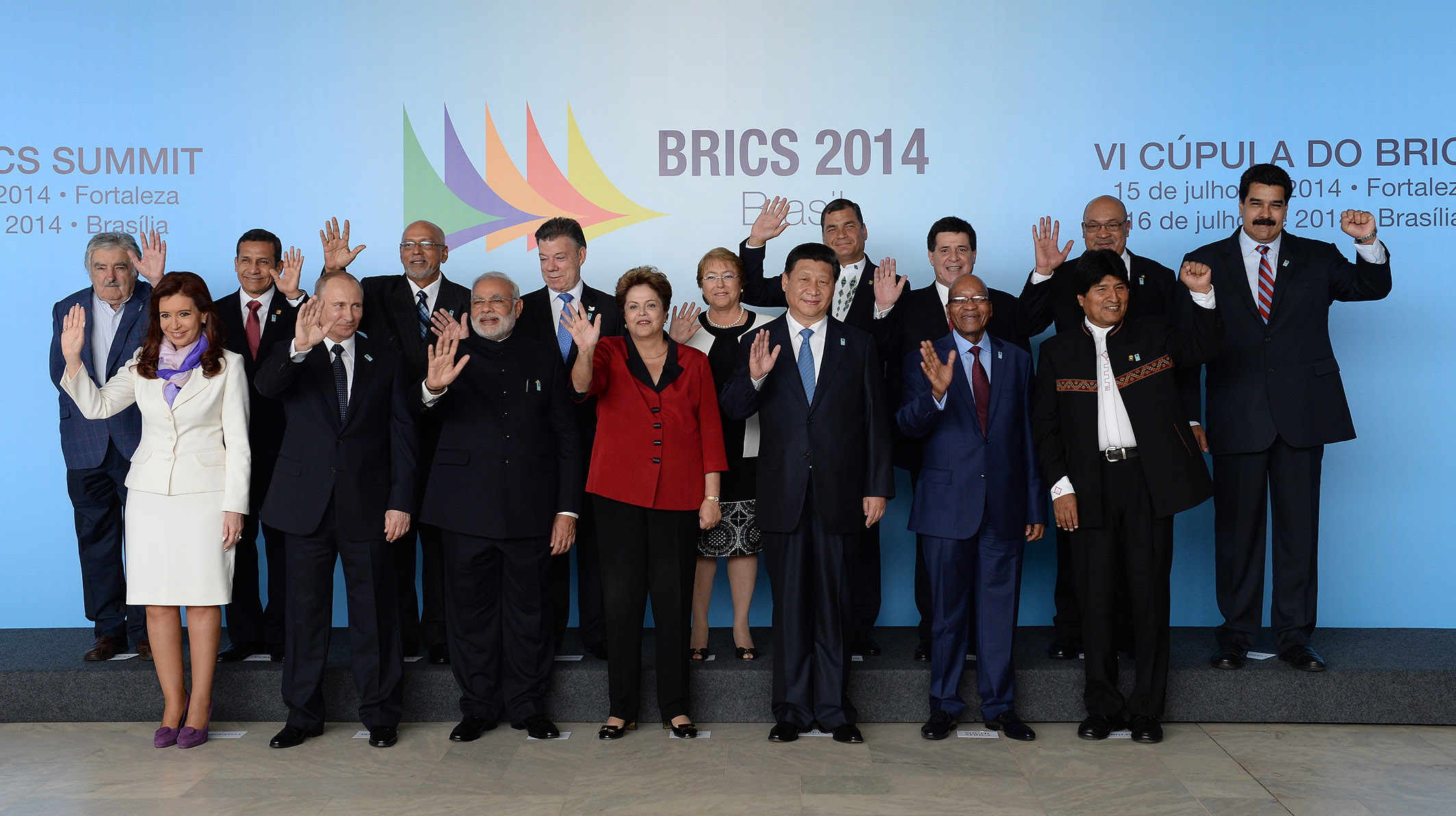
Maduro (far right) at the BRICS and South America Summit in Brazil, 2014

==== 2013 ====
Date	Place	Areas visited	Main purpose
18 April	Peru	Lima	Attended the extraordinary meeting of UNASUR.
7 May	Uruguay	Montevideo	Guest at the Mercosur Summit.
8 May	Argentina	Buenos Aires	Meeting with President Cristina Fernández de Kirchner.
25 May	Bolivia	Cochabamba	Meeting with President Evo Morales.
2 June	Nicaragua	Managua	Meeting with President Daniel Ortega.
2–3 June	Russia	Moscow	Meeting with President Vladimir Putin.
17 June	Vatican City	Vatican City	Meeting with Pope Francis.
26 June	Haiti	Port-au-Prince	Meeting with President Michel Martelly.
29 June	Nicaragua	Managua	Guest at the Petrocaribe summit.
3 July	Belarus	Minsk	Meeting with President Alexander Lukashenko.
30 August	Suriname	Paramaribo	Attended the UNASUR summit.

==== 2014 ====
Date	Place	Areas visited	Main purpose
28–29 January	Cuba	Havana	Guest at the CELAC Summit.
24 September	United States	New York City	Guest at the general debate of the United Nations session period.

==== 2015 ====
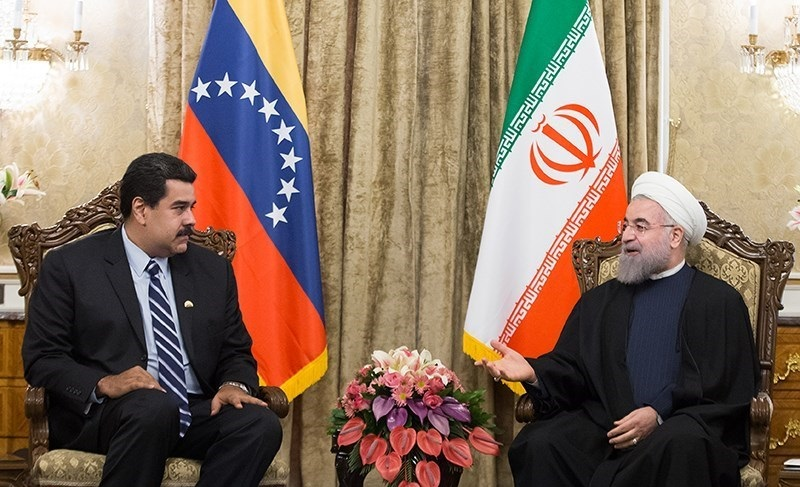
Iranian President Hassan Rouhani and Nicolás Maduro meeting at Sa'dabad Palace, Tehran, in 2015.

Date	Place	Areas visited	Main purpose
10 January	Iran	Tehran	Visit to OPEC member states because of the fall in oil prices.
11–12 January	Saudi Arabia	Jeddah	Working visit.
22 January	Bolivia	La Paz	Guest at the third presidential inauguration of Evo Morales.
8 May	Russia	Moscow	Celebrations of the 70th Victory Day (9 May).
30 August	Vietnam	Hanoi	Working visit.
3 September	China	Beijing	Attended the 2015 China Victory Day Parade.
5 September	Jamaica	Kingston	Guest at the 10th Petrocaribe Summit.
23–24 September	Dominica	Roseau	Meeting with Prime Minister Roosevelt Skerrit.
25 September	Saint Kitts and Nevis	Basseterre	Working visit.
16 October	Suriname	Paramaribo	Working visit.
17 October	Antigua and Barbuda	Saint John's	Meeting with Prime Minister Gaston Browne.
23 November	Iran	Tehran	3rd Gas Exporting Countries Forum Summit.

==== 2016 ====
Date	Place	Areas visited	Main purpose
18 March	Cuba	Havana	Meeting with President Raúl Castro, decorated with the Order José Martí.
21–22 May	Jamaica	Kingston	Meeting with Prime Minister Andrew Holness.
23 May	Trinidad and Tobago	Port of Spain	Meeting with Prime Minister Keith Rowley.
9–13 October	Turkey	Istanbul	World Energy Council.
22–23 October	Iran	Tehran	International tour to boost oil prices.
23 October	Saudi Arabia	Riyadh	International tour to boost oil prices.
24 October	Qatar	Doha	International tour to boost oil prices.
24 October	Vatican City	Vatican City	Meeting with Pope Francis.
4 December	Cuba	Havana	Guest at the state funeral of Fidel Castro.

==== 2017 ====
Date	Place	Areas visited	Main purpose
15 August	Cuba	Havana	Working visit. Meeting with General Secretary Raúl Castro. Visited the tomb of Fidel Castro at Santa Ifigenia Cemetery.
9 September	Kazakhstan	Astana	1st Summit of the Organisation of Islamic Cooperation.
4 October	Russia	Moscow	International energy forum, discussion of Venezuelan debt restructuring.
5–6 October	Turkey	Ankara	Meeting with President Recep Tayyip Erdoğan.

==== 2018 ====
Date	Place	Areas visited	Main purpose
21–22 April	Cuba	Havana	Meeting with President and First Secretary of the Communist Party Miguel Díaz-Canel.
13–16 September	China	Beijing	Meeting with President and General Secretary of the Communist Party Xi Jinping.
26 September	United States	New York City	Delivered a speech in the general debate of the United Nations session period.
31 October	Cuba	Havana	Meeting with General Secretary Raúl Castro.
1 December	Mexico	Mexico City	Guest at the presidential inauguration of Andrés Manuel López Obrador.
4 December	Russia	Moscow	Review of bilateral relations.

==== 2019 ====
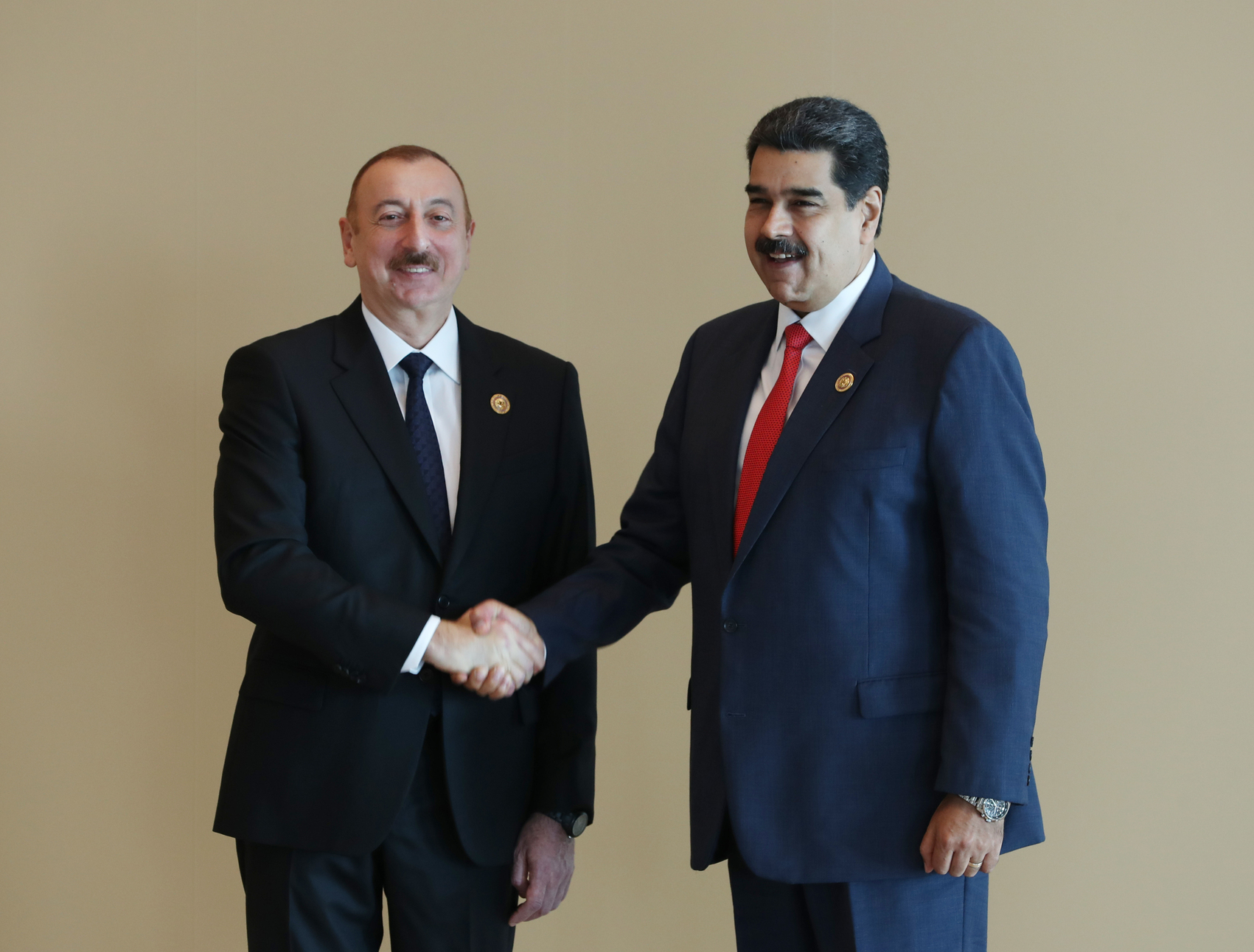
Meeting between Nicolás Maduro and Azerbaijani President Ilham Aliyev during the Non-Aligned Movement summit in Baku in 2019

Date	Place	Areas visited	Main purpose
25 September	Russia	Moscow	Review of bilateral relations.

==== 2022 ====
Date	Place	Areas visited	Main purpose
10 January	Nicaragua	Managua	Guest at the fourth inauguration of Daniel Ortega.
7 June	Turkey	Ankara	Review of bilateral relations.
8 June	Algeria	Algiers	Meeting with President Abdelmadjid Tebboune.
11–12 June	Iran	Tehran	Meeting with President Ebrahim Raisi.
13–14 June	Kuwait	Kuwait City	Working visit.
15 June	Qatar	Doha	Meeting with Emir Tamim bin Hamad Al Thani.
6–18 November	Egypt	Sharm El Sheikh	2022 United Nations Climate Change Conference.

==== 2023 ====
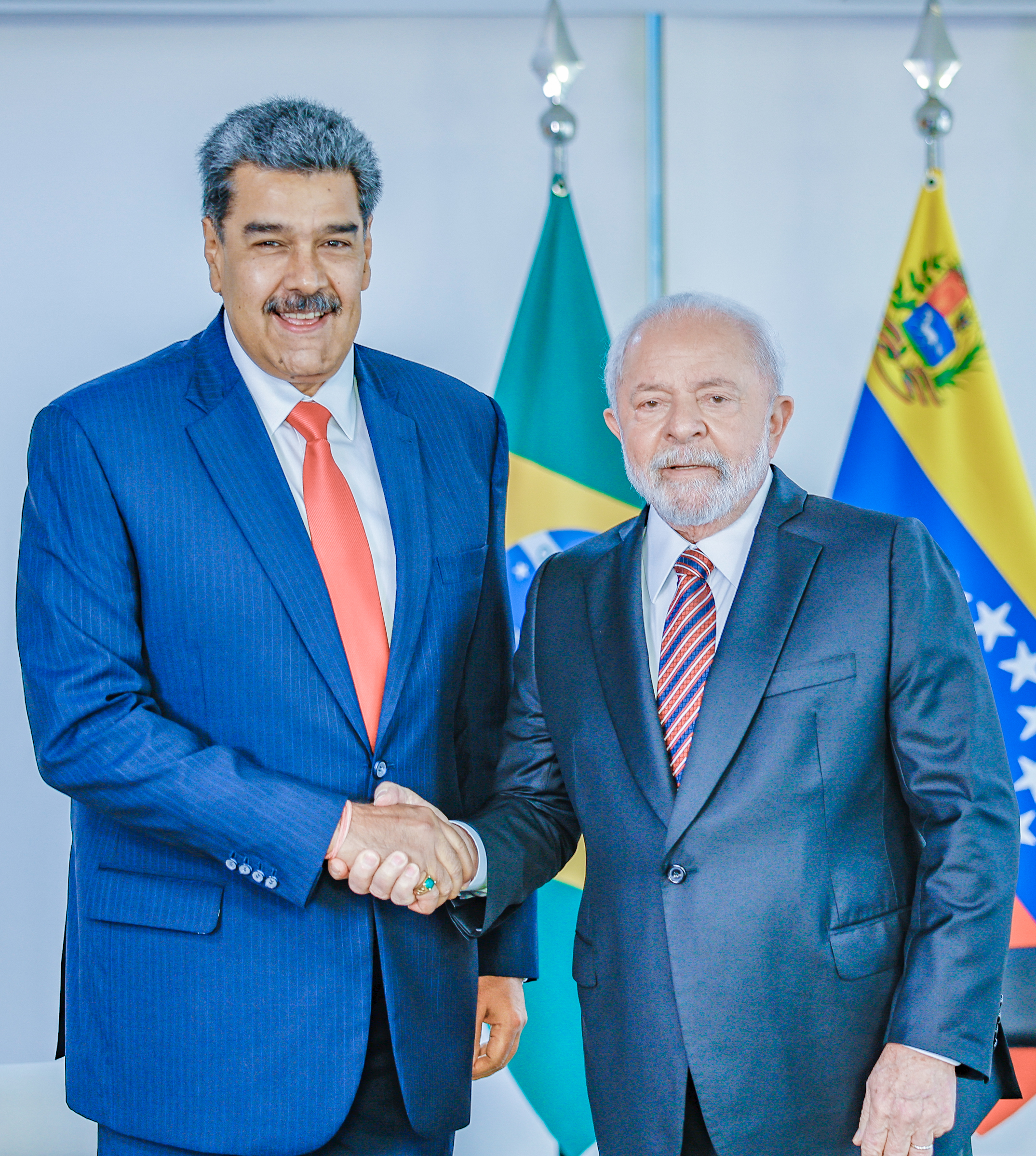
Official visit of Maduro to Brasília, meeting Lula da Silva at the Palácio do Planalto in 2023

Date	Place	Areas visited	Main purpose
16 February	Colombia	Cúcuta	Signing of a Partial Scope Agreement of a Commercial Nature.
6 June	Saudi Arabia	Jeddah	Working visit.
8–13 September	China	Beijing	Meeting with President and General Secretary of the Communist Party Xi Jinping.
22 October	Mexico	Palenque	Summit on migration.
14 December	Saint Vincent and the Grenadines	Kingstown	Meeting with President of Guyana Irfaan Ali, to discuss the Essequibo crisis.

==== 2024 ====
Date	Place	Areas visited	Main purpose
22–24 October	Russia	Kazan	16th BRICS summit.

== Opposition ==
=== 2014–present: Venezuelan protests ===
Since 2014, a series of protests, political demonstrations, and civil insurrection began in Venezuela due to the country's high levels of violence, inflation, and chronic shortages of basic goods attributed to economic policies such as strict price controls. Maduro's government saw the protests as an undemocratic coup d'etat attempt orchestrated by "fascist opposition leaders and the United States".

If they want to march every day, go ahead and march ... I will use the iron fist granted to me by Chávez. Make no mistake about me. I am willing to do anything to defend the homeland, its sovereignty and our people.

— Nicolás Maduro

Although Maduro, a former trade union leader, says he supports peaceful protesting, the Venezuelan government was widely condemned for its handling of the protests. Venezuelan authorities have reportedly gone beyond the use of rubber pellets and tear gas to instances of live ammunition use and torture of arrested protestors, according to organizations like Amnesty International and Human Rights Watch, while the United Nations accused the Venezuelan government of politically motivated arrests, most notably former Chacao mayor and leader of Popular Will, Leopoldo Lopez, who used the controversial charges of murder and inciting violence against him to protest the government's "criminalization of dissent."

Protests dwindled through 2015 and into 2016, though a movement to recall Maduro rekindled anti-government sentiment among Venezuelans, culminating with over one million protesting nationwide on September 1, 2016. Protests since then have continued, especially due to controversies surrounding the recall movement and the continued socioeconomic hardships Venezuelans face on a daily basis.

=== Recall referendum project ===
The process to hold a recall referendum to vote on recalling Maduro was started on May 2, 2016. On that date, opposition leaders in Venezuela handed in a petition to the National Electoral Council (CNE) that started a several stage process. As of July 2016, the Venezuelan government had stated that if enough signatures were collected, a recall vote would be held no sooner than 2017.

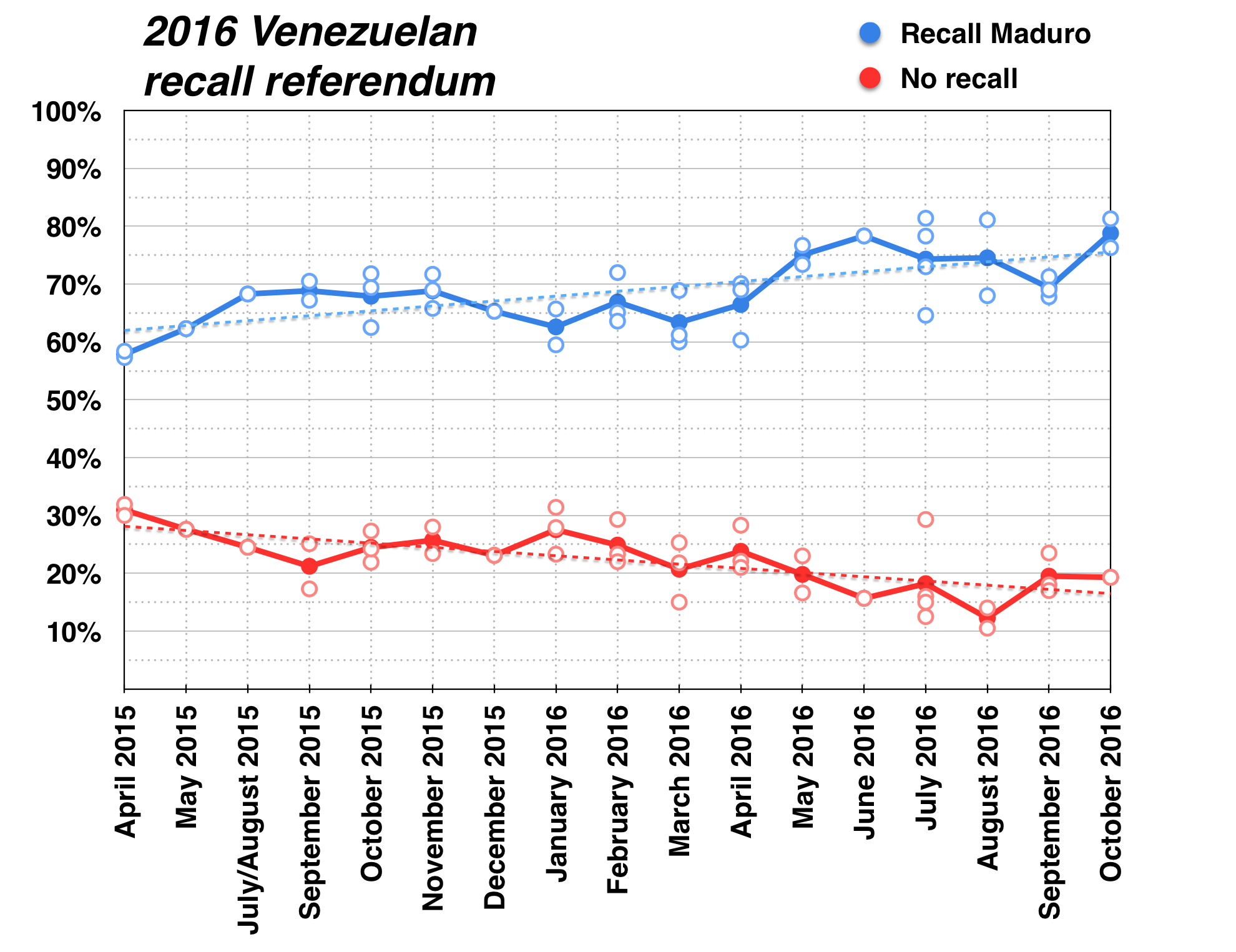
The blue line represents percentage that favor recalling President Maduro. The red line represents percentage that do not wish to recall President Maduro. Unfilled dots represent individual results of the polls. Most polls have been discontinued due to the suspension of the recall movement.

==== Initial petition ====
On May 2, 2016, opposition leaders in Venezuela handed in a petition calling for a recall referendum. On June 21, 2016, the BBC reported that signatures for a referendum to recall Maduro were being recorded by the National Electoral Council (CNE), with the process ongoing for several days. The petition required 1% of the electorate to endorse it before the next stage of voting could be held. According to opposition leaders, in July during a preliminary signature drive for the recall, the CNE "rejected more than half a million signatures for reasons ranging from unclear handwriting to smudged fingerprints."

In early July 2016, Barack Obama urged Venezuela to allow the recall referendum. On July 5, 2016, the Venezuelan intelligence service detained five opposition activists involved with the recall referendum, with two other activists of the same party, Popular Will, also arrested.

According to a July 27, 2016 article in The Guardian, "Venezuela's opposition has demanded authorities move forward on a referendum to force Nicolás Maduro from office, amid complaints that the government is digging in its heels to delay the process." Several days before protests on the issue at the headquarters of the CNE had been held after the CNE missed a deadline on announcing whether a recent petition had collected enough valid signatures. The government, in response, argued the protestors were part of a plot to topple Maduro. At the time, a poll by Venebarómetro found that "88% of 'likely' voters in a recall would choose to oust Maduro."

==== Second phase of the referendum ====
On August 1, 2016, the CNE announced that enough signatures had been validated for the recall process to continue. A date was not set by the CNE for the second phase to take place, which requires raising 20 percent of the electorates' signatures. While opposition leaders pushed for the recall to be held before the end of 2016, allowing a new presidential election to take place, the government vowed a recall would not occur until 2017, ensuring the current vice president would potentially come to power. Reuters reported that the government had launched 9,000 lawsuits alleging fraud in signature collection by that time.

On August 9, 2016, the CNE presented a timeline for the referendum that made it unlikely it would be held before the end of 2016, in part due to a new 90-day verification period for signatures. The second stage of the petition was estimated by the CNE to likely take place in October 2016, resulting in a vote likely happening in February 2017. Opposition leaders were reported to be planning a large protest march in response, with leaders accusing the CNE of favoring the incumbent Socialist Party with the wait time. According to Reuters on August 9, "Socialist Party leaders have dismissed the recall effort as fraudulent and noted that the elections council found nearly 10,000 signatures corresponding to people who were deceased."

Early on September 21, 2016, the National Electoral Council set new guidelines for the recall campaign that The Associated Press described as "unfavorable to the opposition." Among other rules, officials announced that signatures would need to be gathered from 20 percent of Venezuelan voters over three days, specifically October 26 until October 28. In addition, officials required campaigners to gather 20 percent from the electorate in each state, although "opposition leaders say they should only have to gather signatures from 20 percent of voters nationwide." The opposition, which had asked for 20,000 voting machines, was granted 5,400 by officials. On September 21, 2016, the National Electoral Council announced the recall referendum would not be held before January 10, meaning new elections would be ruled out in favor of the VP assuming Maduro's place until the end of the term in 2019. The CNE said that the vote "could be held in the middle of the first quarter of 2017."

==== Suspension of referendum ====
When this happens there is no democracy. What Venezuela has is dictatorship...

— Jose Vicente Haro, Venezuelan law expert

On 21 October 2016, the CNE suspended the referendum only days before preliminary signature-gatherings were to be held. The CNE blamed alleged voter fraud as the reason for the cancellation of the referendum.

===== Domestic reaction =====
Opposition leaders responded by calling on protests against the CNE's actions. The day after the government's announcement, several thousand Venezuelans marched through Caracas protesting against the suspension. Demonstrators were led by Lilian Tintori and Patricia Gutiérrez, wives of arrested opposition politicians.

Experts described the suspension as "unconstitutional". Venezuelan constitutional law expert Jose Vicente Haro stated that the move by the Bolivarian government shows no respect for the constitution while the Washington Office on Latin America called the suspension "a setback for democracy".

===== International reaction =====
Reuters reported on August 4, 2016, that U.S. Secretary of State John Kerry had stated that "we encourage Venezuela to embrace the recall not in a delayed way that pushes it into next year, but to do this as a sign of respect for the constitution of the country and the needs of the people of the country." On August 11, 2016, 15 countries in the Organization of American States released a joint statement urging for the referendum to be held "without delay," to "contribute to the quick and effective resolution of the current political, economic and social difficulties in the country."

=== Presidential crisis ===
The Venezuelan presidential crisis was a political crisis concerning the leadership and legitimacy of the president of Venezuela between 2019 and 2023, with the nation and the world divided in support for Nicolás Maduro or Juan Guaidó.

Venezuela is engulfed in a political and economic crisis which has led to seven million people leaving since 2015. The process and results of the 2018 presidential elections were widely disputed. The opposition-majority National Assembly declared Maduro a usurper of the presidency on the day of his second inauguration and disclosed a plan to set forth its president Guaidó as the succeeding acting president under article 233 of the Venezuelan Constitution. A week later, the Supreme Tribunal of Justice declared that the presidency of the National Assembly was the "usurper" of authority and declared the body to be unconstitutional. Minutes after Maduro took the oath as president, the Organization of American States (OAS) approved a resolution declaring Maduro's presidency illegitimate and urging new elections. Meetings of the OAS on 24 January and the United Nations Security Council on 26 January were held but no consensus reached. During the 49th General Assembly of the Organization of American States on 27 June, Guaidó's presidency was recognized by the organization. Guaidó and the National Assembly declared he was acting president and swore himself in on 23 January.

At his peak, Guaidó was recognized as legitimate by about 60 countries, despite never running as president; Maduro by about 20 countries. However, Guaidó's international support waned. Support followed geopolitical lines, with Russia, China, Cuba, Iran, Syria, and Turkey supporting Maduro, while most Western and Latin American countries supported Guaidó. Support for Guaidó began to decline when an uprising attempt in 2019 failed. Following this failure, representatives of Guaidó and Maduro began mediation. After a second meeting in Norway, no deal was reached. In July 2019, negotiations started again in Barbados. In September, Guaidó announced the end of dialogue following a forty-day absence by the Maduro government as a protest against US sanctions. In March 2020, the US proposed a transitional government that would exclude Maduro and Guaidó from the presidency. U.S. Secretary of State Mike Pompeo said the US would lift sanctions if Maduro agreed to organize elections that did not include him. Guaidó accepted the proposal, while Venezuela's foreign minister, Jorge Arreaza, rejected it.

By January 2020, efforts by Guaidó to create a transitional government had been unsuccessful and Maduro continued to control state institutions. In January 2021, the European Union stopped recognizing Guaidó as president, but still did not recognize Maduro as president; the European Parliament reaffirmed its recognition of Guaidó as president, and the EU threatened with further sanctions. After the announcement of regional elections in 2021, Guaidó announced a "national salvation agreement" and proposed negotiation with Maduro, with a schedule for free and fair elections, with international observers, in exchange for lifting sanctions.

In December 2022, three of the four main opposition political parties backed and approved a plan to dissolve the interim government and create a commission of five members to manage foreign assets, as deputies sought a united strategy ahead of the 2024 Venezuelan presidential election, stating that the interim government had failed to achieve the goals it had set.

==== 2019 Venezuelan protests ====
The 2019 Venezuelan protests were a collection of protests that were organized, since 11 January, as a coordinated effort to remove Nicolás Maduro from the presidency. Demonstrations began following Maduro's controversial second inauguration, developing into a presidential crisis between Maduro and National Assembly president Juan Guaidó. The protests also included counter-demonstrations organized by those who support Maduro.

The protests partially resumed early in 2020, but were suspended due to the arrival of COVID-19 to Venezuela.

=== 2019 Venezuelan uprising attempt ===
On 30 April 2019, during the Venezuelan presidential crisis, a group of several dozen military personnel and civilians joined Juan Guaidó in his call for the removal of Nicolás Maduro as part of what he labeled "Operation Freedom" (Spanish: Operación Libertad). Reuters reported an "uneasy peace" by the afternoon of 30 April. During the unrest, opposition leader Leopoldo López was freed from house arrest after being imprisoned for five years. Manuel Cristopher Figuera, the head of the Bolivarian Intelligence Service, denounced the Maduro government and was dismissed from his position before going into hiding. At least 25 military men who opposed Maduro sought asylum at the Brazilian embassy in Caracas.

=== Overthrow attempts ===
On 3 May 2020 Venezuelan security forces prevented an attempt to overthrow Maduro by armed deserters from Venezuela's security forces. The attempt, named Operation Gideon, was organised by former United States Army Special Forces operator Jordan Goudreau and the men were trained in Colombia. Goudreau said the operation had involved 60 troops, including two former US special forces members. The Venezuelan government stated that the United States and its Drug Enforcement Administration (DEA) were responsible for the operation and had support from Colombia. Juan Guaidó denied involvement in the operation, however, Goudreau said that Guaidó and two political advisers had signed a contract with him for $213 million in October 2019.

=== 2022 Venezuelan recall referendum project ===
On 26 January 2022, the Venezuelan opposition promoted a recall referendum against the Nicolás Maduro government. The National Electoral Council ordered the collection of the required signatures, 20% of the electoral registry, to be carried out in a single day, the equivalent of having to collect four million signatures in twelve hours, which resulted in not reaching the required signatures, the referendum being declared inadmissible and making it impossible to summon for another recall for Maduro's second presidential term.

=== 2024 Venezuelan presidential election protests ===
Protests followed the 2024 Venezuelan presidential election on 28 July, in response to voter fraud and other irregularities during the election cycle, as part of the 2024 Venezuelan political crisis. The election and unrest occurred in the context of the ongoing crisis in Venezuela.

Statistical analyses by multiple organizations indicated that the election was won convincingly by Edmundo Gonzalez but those results have not been recognized by incumbent Nicolás Maduro; the Democratic Unitary Platform (PUD), an alliance of opposition parties, released vote tallies at the precinct level indicating that González won by a wide margin, while the government-controlled National Electoral Council (CNE) announced an unsubstantiated result, without any precinct-level tallies, stating Maduro won. Both candidates claimed victory, while many countries recognized González as the winner.

Demonstrations to uphold the results of the election, along with vigils for political prisoners, occurred worldwide after the July election. Spontaneous protests broke out immediately after the election, while later rallies were organized by the Venezuelan opposition; Maduro claimed the opposition was encouraging a coup and has charged demonstraters with terrorism, while initiating an unprecedented crackdown. Maduro's security forces have gone door-to-door seeking to arrest protesters, poll workers and members of the opposition in what Maduro has referred to as Operation Tun Tun, and armed bands of Maduro supporters known as colectivos have joined security forces in repressing dissent. As of 14 August 2024, at least 2,200 persons are reported to have been arrested, and 25 killed; Maduro has announced plans to continue to seek the arrest of dissenters, and to rehabilitate two prisons to house those detained.

The repression has been widely condemned by international groups; Amnesty International penned an open letter requesting urgent action from the International Criminal Court (ICC), on the basis of an ongoing ICC investigation of possible crimes against humanity under Maduro's regime.

== Capture of Maduro ==
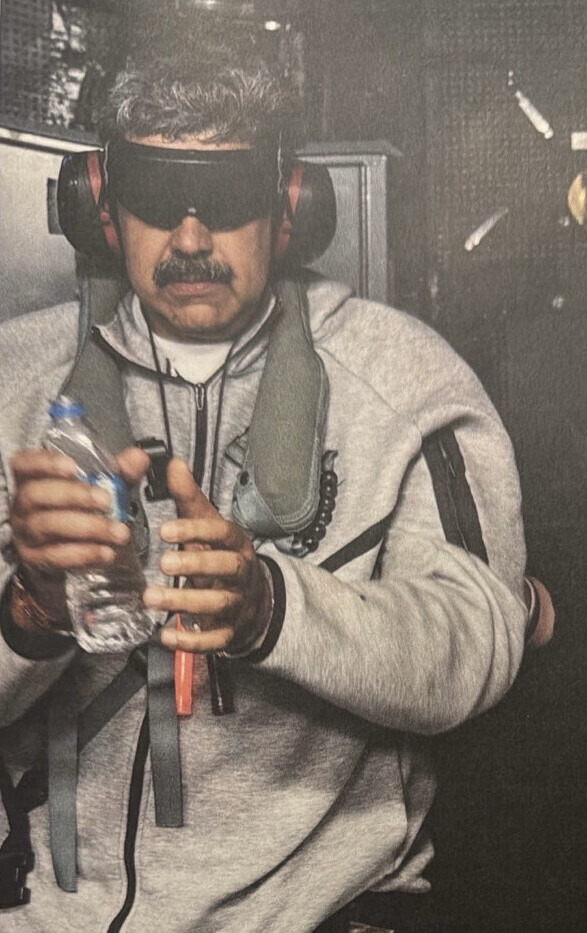
Nicolas Maduro aboard the USS Iwo Jima

On January 3, 2026, U.S. forces captured Maduro and his wife, Cilia Flores, in an operation, codenamed "Operation Absolute Resolve". The operation involved coordinated airstrikes across northern Venezuela and a surprise pre-dawn raid by elite U.S. troops on a Caracas military compound. The couple was transported to New York City to face federal charges of narco-terrorism and drug trafficking. Many analysts have likened the operation to Operation Nifty Package which led to the capture of Panamanian military leader, Manuel Noriega, as well as Operation Red Dawn, which led to the capture of former Iraqi president, Saddam Hussein.

=== Aftermath ===
Vice President Delcy Rodríguez assumed the presidency, following the ousting of Maduro. In just a few months, Rodríguez reshuffled roughly 40% of her cabinet, replacing 17 ministers and updating military leadership to install her own loyalists. Powerful Maduro loyalists, such as long-serving Defense Minister Vladimir Padrino López and Attorney General Tarek William Saab, were stripped of their posts. This consolidation was further highlighted when Venezuela’s Minister of Industry and National Production, Alex Saab, was also captured in February 2026 in a joint operation by American and Venezuelan intelligence agencies. In May 2026, he was deported to the US.

== See also ==
- Madurismo
- Bolivarian Revolution
- Second inauguration of Nicolás Maduro
- International Criminal Court investigation in Venezuela
- Sanctions during the Venezuelan crisis
