= Sanctions during the Venezuelan crisis =

Sanctions during the crisis in Venezuela

Map of countries that have introduced sanctions against Venezuela during the ongoing crisis in Venezuela Venezuela Countries that introduced sanctions European Union countries that introduced sanctions Non-E.U. European countries that aligned with E.U. sanctions Countries that had entry bans on Maduro government officials

During the crisis in Venezuela, the European Union (E.U.), Canada, Mexico, Panama and Switzerland applied sanctions against specific Venezuelan government entities and individuals associated with the administration of Nicolás Maduro, along with sanctions applied by the United States. As of 3 March 2025, the Atlantic Council's sanctions tracker listed 209 individuals with links to Venezuela sanctioned by the U.S., 123 by Canada, and 69 by the European Union.

Early sanctions came in response to repression during the 2014 and the 2017 Venezuelan protests, and activities both during the 2017 Constituent Assembly election and the 2018 presidential election. Sanctions were placed on current and former government officials, including members of the Supreme Tribunal of Justice (TSJ) and the 2017 Constituent National Assembly (ANC), members of the military and security forces, and private individuals accused of being involved in human rights abuses, degradation in the rule of law, repression of democracy, and corruption. Canada and the E.U. began applying sanctions in 2017.

In August 2017, the administration of Donald Trump imposed sanctions which prohibited Venezuela's access to U.S. financial markets, and in May 2018, expanded them to block purchase of Venezuelan debt. Beginning in January 2019, during the Venezuelan presidential crisis, the U.S. applied additional economic sanctions to individuals or companies in the petroleum, gold, mining, and banking industries and a food subsidy program; other countries also applied sanctions in response to the presidential crisis.

Companies in the petroleum sector evaded the sanctions on Venezuela's state-owned oil company, PDVSA, to continue oil shipments. In October 2023, the administration of Joe Biden temporarily lifted some U.S. sanctions on the oil, gas and gold industries in exchange for the promise of the release of political prisoners and free 2024 elections. Most of the sanctions were reimposed in April 2024 when the U.S. State Department said the Barbados Agreement to hold free elections had not been fully honored, although waivers were allowed to some companies in the form of individual licenses to continue operating in the oil sector.

As part of the 2026 United States intervention in Venezuela and after their capture of Nicolás Maduro, the remaining government led by Delcy Rodríguez passed a law to allow private companies to participate in the oil industry. As a consequence, the United States started eased various sanctions related on oil trade.

== United States ==
=== History and legislation ===
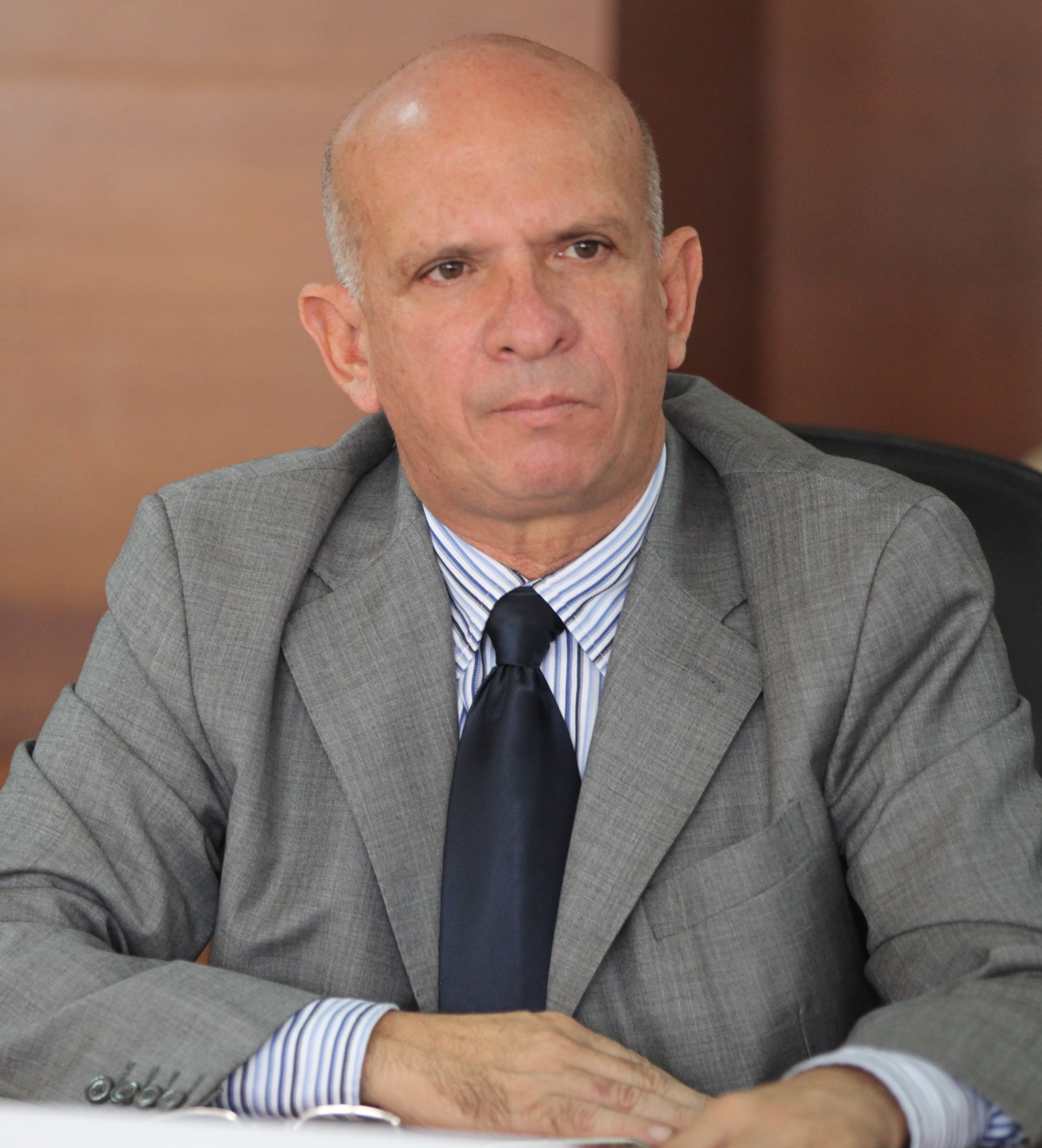
Hugo Carvajal in 2016; the former head of intelligence and confidant of Chávez was sanctioned by the U.S. in 2008, arrested in Spain in 2019, and pled guilty to narcoterrorism charges in the U.S. in 2025.

The U.S. had been concerned about Venezuelan narcotics trafficking since 2005 and Venezuela's lack of cooperation in combatting terrorism since 2006. In 2008, Executive Order (EO) 13224 aimed to reduce terrorist funding in Venezuela via sanctions; the United States Department of the Treasury has used the Foreign Narcotics Kingpin Designation Act to sanction at least 22 Venezuelans as of 2019.

Prior to the ongoing crisis in Venezuela, the U.S. Office of Foreign Assets Control (OFAC) sanctioned three current or former Venezuelan government officials in 2008, saying there was evidence they had materially helped the Revolutionary Armed Forces of Colombia (FARC) in the illegal drug trade. In 2011, four allies of Hugo Chávez were sanctioned for allegedly helping FARC obtain weapons and smuggle drugs.

U.S. President Barack Obama signed the Venezuela Defense of Human Rights and Civil Society Act of 2014, imposing sanctions on Venezuelan individuals held responsible by the U.S. for human rights violations during the 2014 Venezuelan protests.

==== 2015 ====
Barack Obama issued a presidential order on 9 March 2015 declaring Venezuela a "threat to [U.S.] national security", and ordered the Treasury Department to freeze property and assets of seven Venezuelan officials it held responsible for human rights abuses, repression and at least 43 deaths during demonstrations.

==== 2017 ====
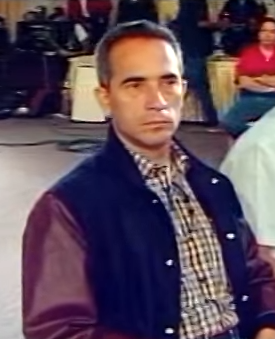
Freddy Bernal in 2003, sanctioned by Canada, the European Union, Panama and the United States

Tareck El Aissami, Vice President of Economy and Minister for National Industry and Production, and his frontman Samark Jose Lopez Bello were named in February as significant international narcotics traffickers. Five U.S. companies in Florida and an airplane registered in the U.S. were also blocked.

Maikel Moreno and seven members of the Venezuelan Supreme Justice Tribunal (TSJ) were sanctioned in May for usurping the functions of the Venezuelan National Assembly and permitting Maduro to govern by decree.

In July, thirteen senior officials of the Venezuelan government associated with the 2017 Venezuelan Constituent Assembly elections were sanctioned for what the U.S. labeled as their role in undermining democracy and human rights. Those sanctioned included Tibisay Lucena, President of the Maduro-controlled National Electoral Council (CNE); Néstor Reverol, Minister of Interior and former Commander General of Venezuelan National Guard (GNB); and Tarek William Saab, Ombudsman and President of Moral Council. The U.S. State Department condemned that election and refused to recognize it. The day after the election, the U.S. sanctioned Maduro.

The U.S. Treasury Department sanctioned eight officials associated with the 2017 Constituent National Assembly (ANC) in August, including Adán Chávez, the brother of Hugo Chávez.

In November, ten more government officials were added to OFAC's list of Venezuelans sanctioned after the regional elections.

==== 2018 ====
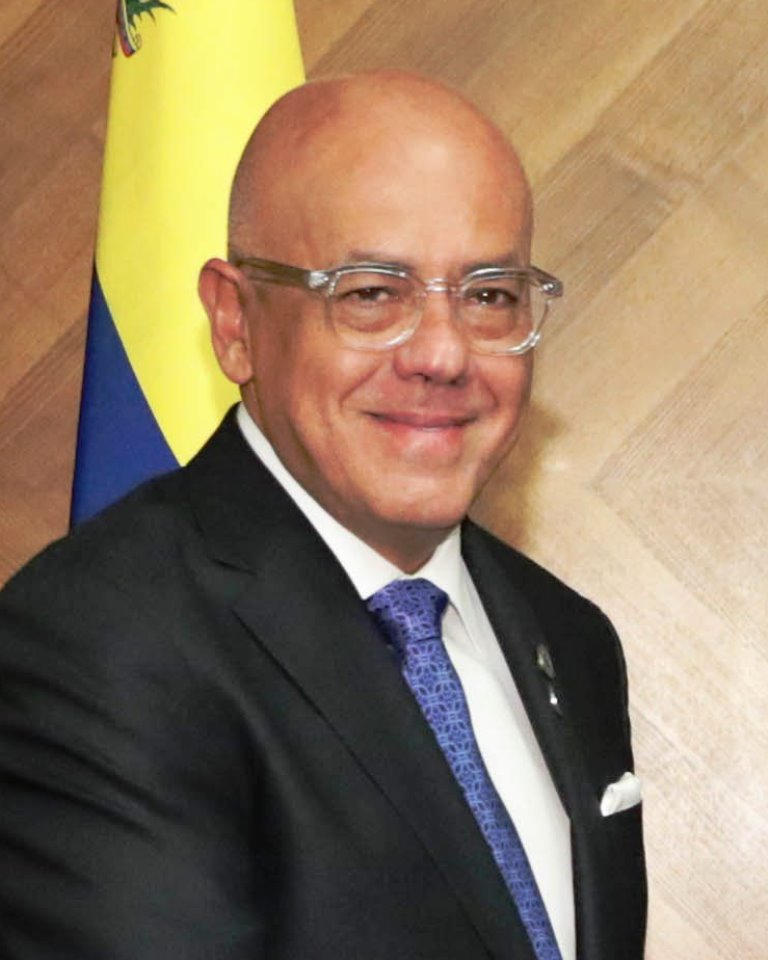
Jorge Rodríguez, National Assembly president and Delcy's brother, sanctioned by U.S. and Canada

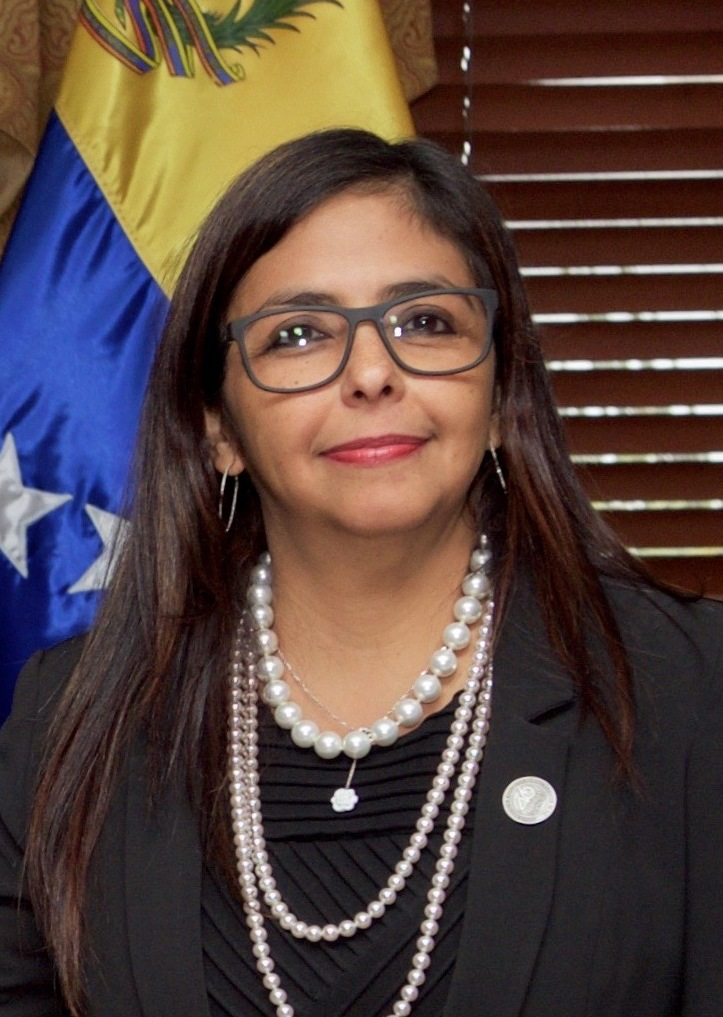
Venezuelan Vice President Delcy Rodríguez, sanctioned by Canada, the European Union, Mexico and the U.S.

The U.S. Treasury Department said on 5 January 2018 that corruption and repression continued in Venezuela and four senior military officers were sanctioned, followed by four more in March.

Just before the May 2018 Venezuelan presidential election, the U.S. sanctioned four Venezuelans and three companies it said were involved in corruption and money laundering including Diosdado Cabello, Chavismo's number two person and President of the ANC, and Cabello's wife and brother, along with fourteen properties owned or controlled by Rafael Sarria in Florida and New York.

The U.S. Treasury Department seized a private jet and imposed sanctions on Maduro's inner circle in September. Maduro's wife, Cilia Flores, Defense Minister Vladimir Padrino López, Vice President Delcy Rodríguez, and her brother Jorge Rodríguez, Minister of Communications, were sanctioned.

==== 2019 ====
On 8 January, the U.S. Treasury sanctioned seven individuals who they said were benefitting from a corrupt currency exchange scheme, and the Venezuelan private TV network Globovisión and other companies owned or controlled by Raúl Gorrín and Gustavo Perdomo.

On 15 February 2019, officials of Maduro's security and intelligence were sanctioned along with Manuel Quevedo, the head of PDVSA.

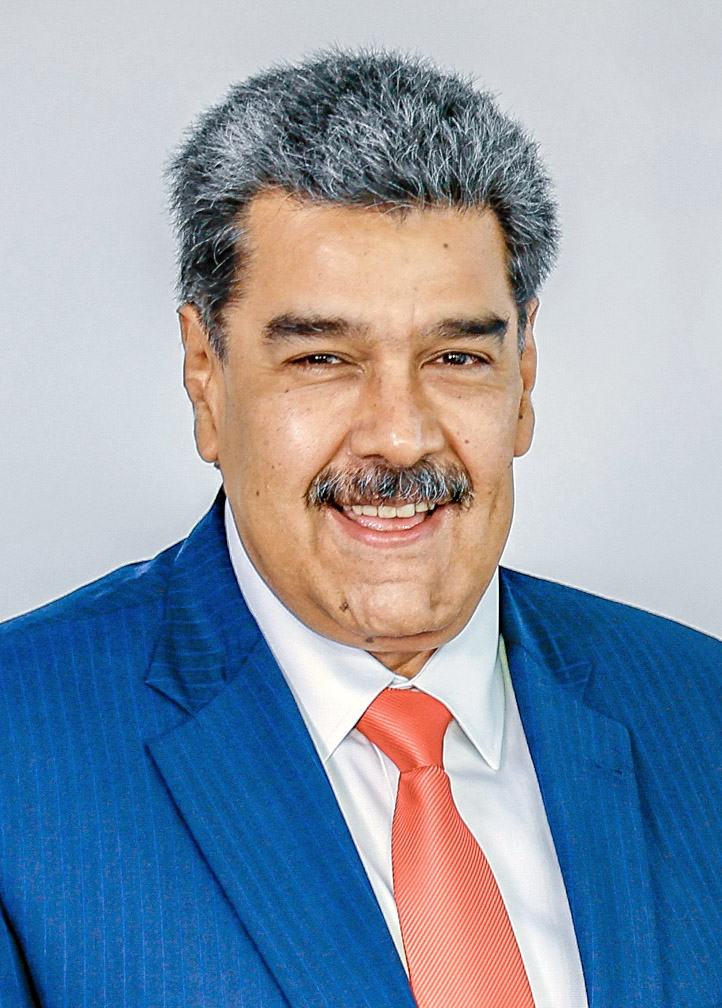
Nicolás Maduro in 2023

During the February 2019 shipping of humanitarian aid to Venezuela, four Venezuelan state governors were added to the sanctions list. In March, six more military and security forces individuals who the U.S. alleged helped obstruct the delivery of humanitarian aid were blacklisted, followed by the president of Minerven, Venezuela's state-run mining company, Adrian Antonio Perdomo.

The U.S. Treasury added sanctions on 17 April to the Central Bank of Venezuela and one of its directors, Iliana Ruzza, to two Central Bank directors already sanctioned. Maduro said the sanctions were "totally illegal".

On 26 April 2019, the U.S. Treasury accused Maduro's foreign minister Jorge Arreaza and Judge Carol Padilla of exploiting the U.S. financial system to support Maduro, and blacklisted them.

Following the Venezuelan uprising on 30 April 2019, the U.S. removed sanctions against former SEBIN chief Manuel Cristopher Figuera, who broke ranks with Maduro.

The U.S. sanctioned two former Venezuelan government officials, Luis Alfredo Motta Domínguez and Eustiquio Jose Lugo Gomez, on 27 June alleging they were engaging in significant corruption and fraud.

President Maduro's son, Nicolás Maduro Guerra, was sanctioned on 28 June 2019 as a member of Venezuela's Constituent Assembly.

Following the June death while in custody of Venezuelan navy captain Rafael Acosta Arévalo, the U.S. sanctioned Dirección General de Contrainteligencia Militar (DGCIM) and officials, accusing the defense agency of being responsible for his death.

Five politicians and security officials, who had earlier been sanctioned by the E.U. or Canada, were added to the U.S. sanctions list on 5 November 2019 for alleged corruption and violence during opposition protests.

==== 2020 ====
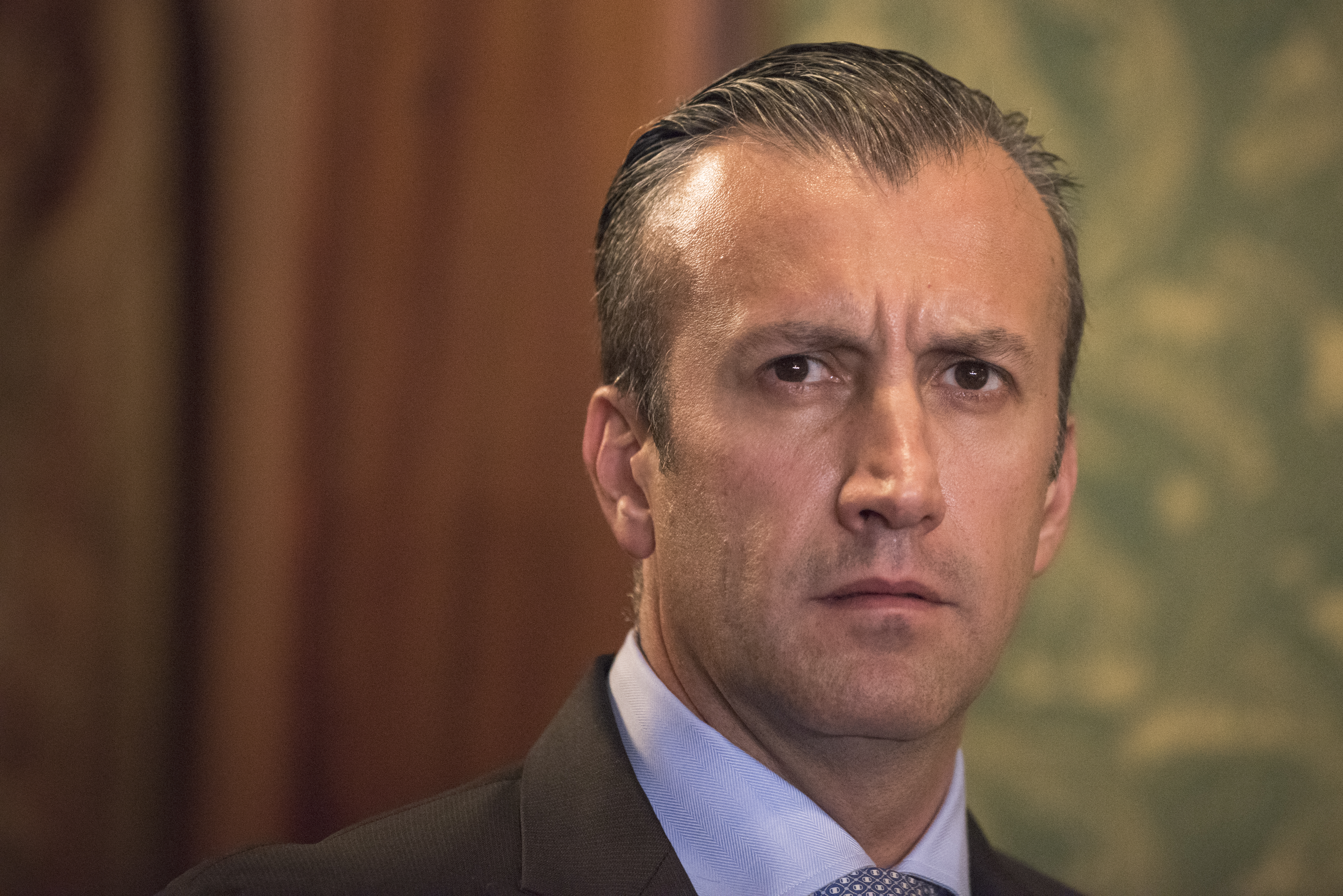
Tareck El Aissami, sanctioned by Canada, the European Union, Switzerland and the United States

The U.S. Treasury Department sanctioned seven individuals for their involvement in the disputed January 2020 Venezuelan National Assembly Delegated Committee election that resulted in two claims for the Presidency of the National Assembly: one by legislator Luis Parra, later supported by Maduro, and one by the incumbent Juan Guaidó. Parra was sanctioned along with Franklyn Duarte, José Brito and others.

OFAC sanctioned the president and board chairman, Didier Casimiro, of Rosneft on 18 February, for supporting Maduro's government by operating in the oil sector.

On 26 March 2020, the U.S. State Department offered a $15 million reward on Nicolás Maduro (increased to $25 million in 2025), and $10 million each on Diosdado Cabello, Hugo Carvajal, Clíver Alcalá Cordones and Tareck El Aissami, for information to bring those individuals to justice for alleged drug trafficking and narco-terrorism. Carvajal pled guilty to all charges in a U.S. court in 2025.

Two friends of Maduro and his son, Nicolas Ernesto Maduro Guerra, were sanctioned on 23 July for their alleged role in an illicit gold scheme.

On 22 September, the U.S. Treasury described five sanctioned individuals as supporting, manipulating and rigging the upcoming 2020 Venezuelan parliamentary elections. The company Ex-Cle Soluciones Biometricas CA, and individuals associated with it, were sanctioned on 18 December for providing services for that election.

==== 2024 ====
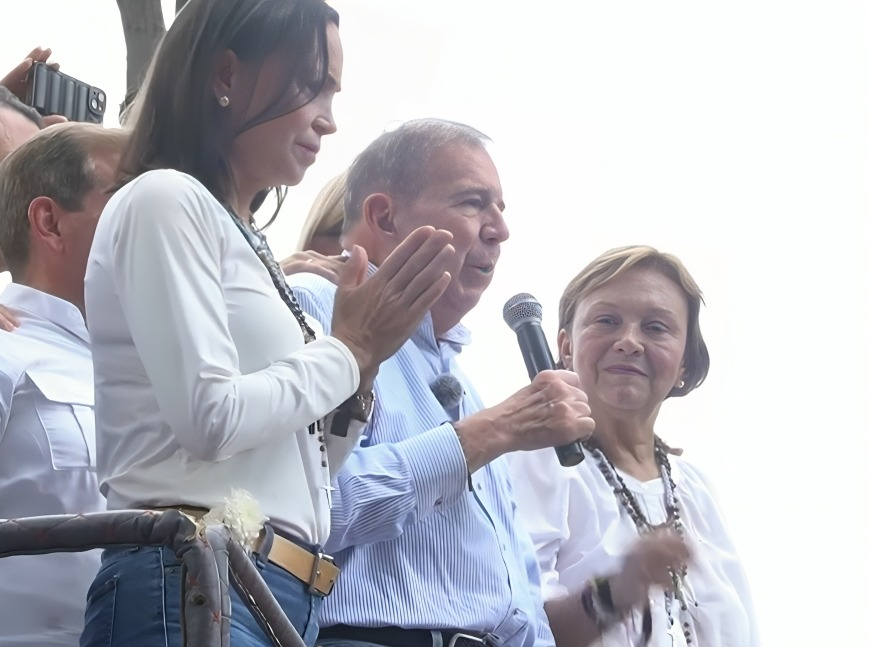
María Corina Machado and Edmundo González Urrutia along with his wife in July after the 2024 Venezuelan presidential election

Following the declaration without evidence by Venezuela's National Electoral Council (CNE) and validation by the Supreme Tribunal of Justice (TSJ) that Maduro had won the 28 July 2024 presidential election, condemned as fraudulent, the U.S. began reviewing a list of 60 individuals and their family members for possible sanctions.

On 12 September 16 individuals associated with Maduro and the subsequent repression were sanctioned. Among the sanctioned were five members of the TSJ, the lower-court judge who issued a warrant for the arrest of opposition candidate Edmundo González, the CNE, and "military and intelligence officials accused of post-election repression".

Caryslia Rodríguez, the head of the TSJ who issued the ruling validating Maduro's win, was sanctioned along with Edward Miguel Briceño Cisneros and Luis Ernesto Dueñez Reyes, the judge and prosecutor responsible for the arrest warrant against González

In an environment of repression that followed the election, 21 additional senior officials of the Maduro government were sanctioned by the U.S. on 27 November 2024.

==== 2025 ====
Following the disputed July 2024 Venezuelan presidential election, Maduro was inaugurated for a third term as president on 10 January 2025; that day, the U.S., E.U., U.K. and Canada placed new sanctions on Venezuelan individuals. The U.S. also increased the reward for Maduro's arrest to $25 million. U.S. Secretary of State Blinken stated that the U.S. "does not recognize Nicolas Maduro as the president of Venezuela". Maduro replied that the "outgoing government of the United States doesn't know how to take revenge on us". Héctor Obregón Pérez, the new head of PDVSA was sanctioned. The Biden administration continued authorizing Chevron and other oil companies to operate in Venezuela.

Seven alleged leaders and key members of the gang Tren de Aragua (Giovanni Vicente Mosquera Serrano, Hector Rusthenford Guerrero Flores, Yohan Jose Romero, Josue Angel Santana Pena, Wilmer Jose Perez Castillo, Wendy Marbelys Rios Gomez, and Felix Anner Castillo) were sanctioned in June and July. In December, the U.S. Treasury Department sanctioned additional individuals and companies, including model and actress Jimena Araya, accusing them of engaging in money laundering for Tren de Aragua.

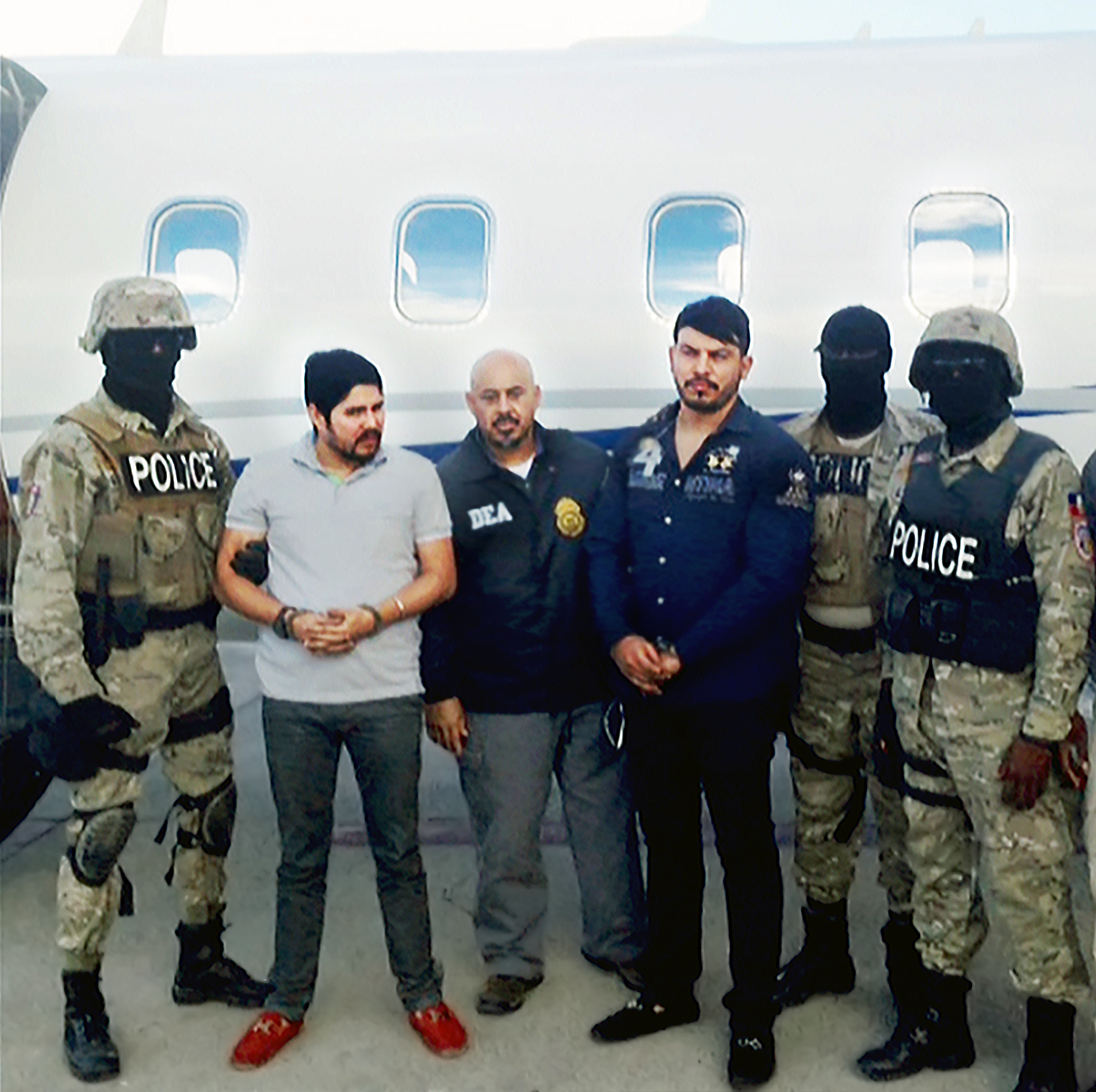
Efrain Antonio Campo Flores and Franqui Francisco Flores de Freitas, nephews of Maduro's wife Cilia Flores, after their 2015 arrest by the U.S. Drug Enforcement Administration

The day after the 10 December seizure of oil tanker Skipper by the U.S. off the coast of Venezuela, additional sanctions targeting Maduro's family and oil shipments by six vessels and associated companies were imposed. According to the Miami Herald, the sanctions aim to reverse loosening of sanctions under the Biden administration, which failed to help achieve a fair presidential election in 2024, and to "disrupt what the [U.S. Treasury] described as a persistent web of corruption, narcotrafficking and sanctions evasions". Ramon Carretero Napolitano, a Panamanian businessman who the U.S. alleges has profited from oil ventures with relatives of Maduro and his wife, Cilia Flores, was also sanctioned.

Three nephews of Flores sanctioned on 11 December are cousins Efraín Antonio Campo Flores and Franqui Francisco Flores de Freitas, and Carlos Erik Malpica Flores. The cousins were convicted and imprisoned on drug charges in the U.S. in 2016, and released by the Biden administration in a 2022 prisoner exchange. Malpica Flores was sanctioned in 2017, and removed from the sanctioned list by the Biden administration in 2022 during negotiations to encourage free and fair presidential elections in 2024. Seven more individuals related to Cilia Flores, Carlos Malpica Flores, and Carretero were sanctioned on 19 December.

Jose Jesus Urdaneta Gonzalez and Empresa Aeronautica Nacional SA were sanctioned on 30 December for trade with Iran of drones. Four Chinese-based tankers, and their owner/operators, were sanctioned on 31 December.

=== Scope of sanctions ===
==== On individuals ====
As of 7 August 2023, the Congressional Research Service said the U.S. maintained sanctions on more than 110 individuals.

==== On industries ====
Trump issued EO 13850 on 1 November 2018 to block the assets of anyone involved in alleged corruption in the gold sector, or "any other sector of the economy as determined in the future by the Secretary of the Treasury". Treasury secretary Steven Mnuchin announced on 28 January 2019 that EO 13850 applied to the petroleum sector.

Three additional Executive Orders were applied in 2017 and 2018. EO 13808, issued on 27 July 2017, prohibits the Venezuelan government from accessing U.S. financial markets, allowing for "exceptions to minimize the impact on the Venezuelan people and U.S. economic interests". Issued in 2018, EO 13827 prohibited the use of Venezuelan digital currency, and EO 13835 prohibited the purchase of Venezuelan debt.

===== Petroleum =====
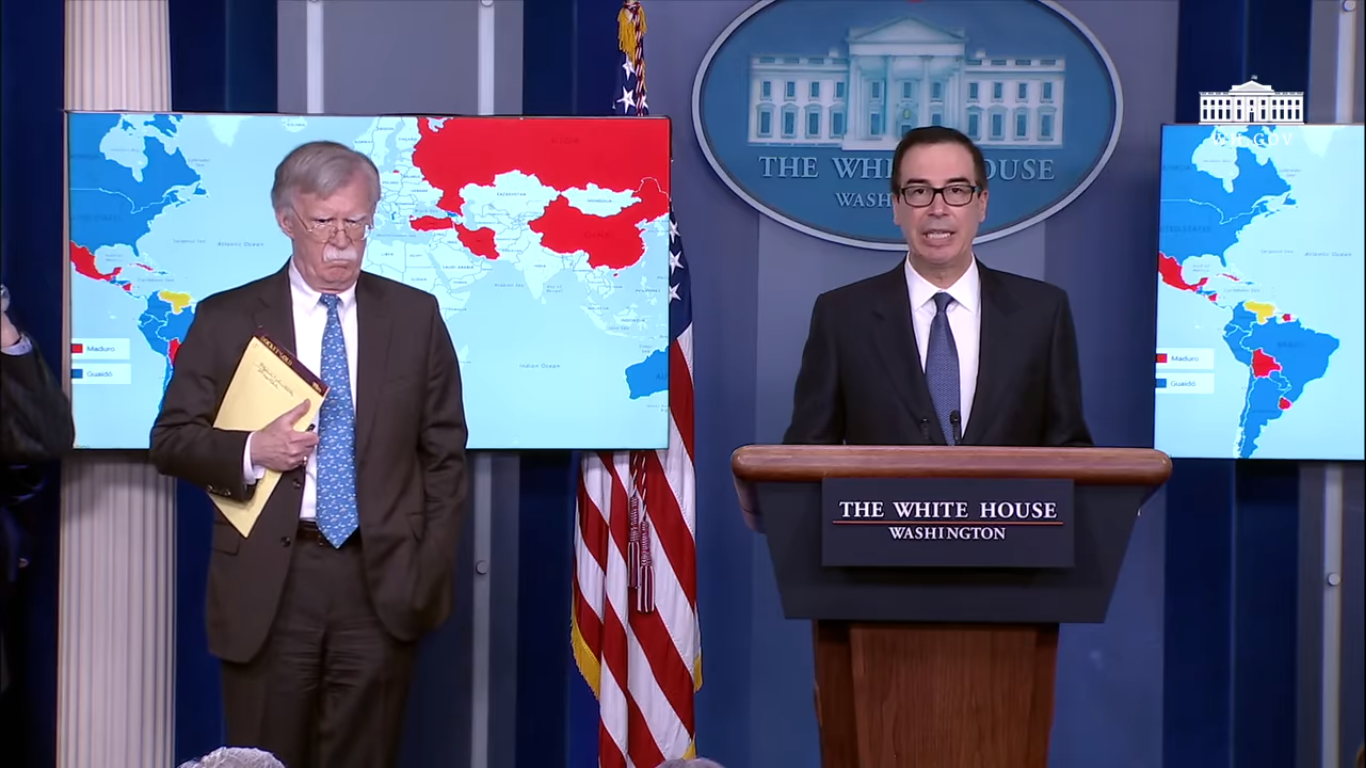
U.S. National Security Advisor John R. Bolton and Treasury Secretary Steven Mnuchin announce PDVSA sanctions

Trump imposed economic sanctions in August 2017 that affected Venezuela's petroleum industry by prohibiting the trading of Venezuelan bonds in U.S. markets. The New York Times said that loopholes in the sanctions would permit "financing of most commercial trade ... and financing for humanitarian services to the Venezuelan people". The White House saw the measures as a way to "protect the United States financial system from complicity in Venezuela's corruption and in the impoverishment of the Venezuelan people" without disallowing humanitarian aid while preventing the "fire sale" of Venezuelan assets.

The U.S. imposed additional sanctions on PDVSA on 28 January 2019 to pressure Maduro to resign during the 2019 Venezuelan presidential crisis. The sanctions prevented PDVSA from being paid for petroleum exports to the U.S., froze $7 billion of PDVSA's U.S. assets and prevented U.S. firms from exporting naphtha to Venezuela. Bolton estimated the expected loss to the Venezuelan economy at more than $11 billion in 2019.

In February 2019, Maduro ordered PDVSA to move its European office to Moscow to protect its overseas assets from U.S. sanctions. The Russian state-run oil company Rosneft had supplied naphtha to Venezuela and continued to purchase Venezuelan petroleum, which it said was through contracts that were in place prior to the U.S. sanctions. Exports of Venezuela's heavy crude oil depend on diluents that were imported from the U.S. before sanctions; Rosneft chartered a ship to load thinners from Malta and deliver them to Venezuela on 22 March, and arranged for Venezuelan crude oil to be processed in India. Other companies including India's Reliance Industries Limited, Spain's Repsol, and commodity trading companies Trafigura and Vitol continued to supply Venezuela's oil industry. On 18 February 2020, OFAC sanctioned Rosneft Trading S.A. for supporting Maduro's government by operating in the oil sector, and added a Swiss subsidiary of Rosneft, TNK Trading International S.A., on 12 March.

Reuters reported on 18 April 2019 that the Maduro administration was bypassing sanctions by funneling cash from petroleum sales through Russia's Rosneft. Reliance denied reports that it was in violation of U.S. sanctions and stated that its purchases of Venezuelan oil through Rosneft were approved by the U.S. State Department. April oil exports were steady at a million barrels daily, "partially due to inventory drains", with most shipments to buyers from India and China. With sanctions, shipments to Cuba were unchanged.

===== Cuban oil shipments =====
Alleging that Cuban personnel and advisors helped the Maduro government maintain power, the U.S. sanctioned two companies on 5 April 2019 that had shipped Venezuelan oil to Cuba, along with 34 ships owned by PDVSA, followed by nine more ships and four more shipping companies on 12 April.

In response to the arrest of National Assembly members, the U.S. sanctioned on 10 May 2019 two shipping companies and two ships that transported oil from Venezuela to Cuba between late 2018 and March 2019. Sanctions on some shipping companies were lifted later in 2019.

The Cuban state-run oil import and export company, Cubametales, was sanctioned on 3 July 2019; a Treasury press release said it had facilitated oil imports to Cuba from Venezuela in exchange for defense support, intelligence, and security assistance. Cuba continued to receive shipments, and four more companies facilitating oil shipments from Venezuela to Cuba were sanctioned in September. In November, the Cuban company Corporacion Panamericana SA was blacklisted for helping Cubametales evade sanctions.

===== Petrocaribe =====
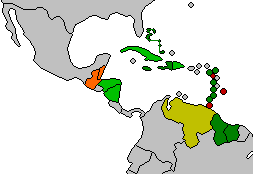
Venezuela Petrocaribe and CARICOM members Petrocaribe members not part of CARICOM CARICOM members not part of Petrocaribe

Through Petrocaribe, a regional oil procurement agreement between Venezuela and Caribbean member states, Caribbean countries could finance some of their Venezuelan crude oil purchases at 1% interest and Cuba received free oil in exchange for medical services.

Research by the journalism group Connectas said that Petrocaribe countries were intended to protect Venezuela's sovereignty in international organizations like the UN and OAS. Several leaders of Caribbean countries supporting Maduro criticized the US sanctions, saying their support for Maduro was based on principles, not oil, and that sanctions were affecting their countries' supply, debt payments, and the region's stability.

With the Venezuelan crisis dividing Caribbean countries, those countries that did not recognize Maduro were invited to meet with Trump in March 2019; Trump promised more investment to the countries supporting Guaidó (Bahamas, Dominican Republic, Haiti, Jamaica and Saint Lucia).

===== Gold =====
Venezuela's third-largest export (after crude oil and refined petroleum products) in 2019 was gold. The country's gold production is controlled by the military and is mined under dangerous conditions. The World Gold Council reported in January 2019 that Venezuela's foreign-held gold reserves had fallen by 69% to US$8.4 billion during Maduro's presidency, but that it was hard to track where the gold was going. Central Bank gold holdings decreased in November 2018 from US$6.1 billion to US$5.5 billion; the last independent observer to access the vault where gold is stored was Francisco Rodríguez, who saw an estimated US$15 billion in 2014. Reuters reported that 20 tons were removed from the vaults in 2018, and 23 tons of mined gold were taken to Istanbul, Turkey.

On 1 November 2018 Trump signed an executive order to "ban US persons from dealing with entities and individuals involved with 'corrupt or deceptive' gold sales from Venezuela".

In mid-February 2019, National Assembly legislator Angel Alvarado said that about eight tons of gold had been taken from the vault while the head of the Central Bank was abroad. In March, Ugandan investigators reported that 7.4 tonnes of gold worth over US$300 million could have been smuggled into that country.

The U.S. Treasury Department sanctioned Minerven, Venezuela's state-run mining company, in March 2019.

Government sources said another eight tonnes of gold was taken out of the Central Bank in the first week of April 2019; the government source said that there were 100 tonnes left. The gold was removed while the bank was not fully operational because of the 2019 Venezuelan blackouts and minimal staff was present; the destination of the gold was not known.

Between 2013 and 2016, Venezuela shipped US$5.2 billion worth of gold to Switzerland, which froze the assets of Maduro and 35 people close to him in January 2026.

===== Banking and finance =====
Trump signed an order on 19 March 2018 that prohibited people in the US from making any type of transaction with digital currency emitted by or in the name of the government of Venezuela as of 9 January 2018, referencing the Petro token.

On 11 March 2019, the U.S. sanctioned the Russian bank Evrofinance Mosnarbank, stating that the Moscow-based bank was an economic lifeline for Maduro's administration.

After the detention of Guaidó's chief of staff, Roberto Marrero, in March 2019, the US Treasury Department responded by placing sanctions on the Venezuelan bank BANDES and its subsidiaries. China Development Bank had paid billions of dollars through BANDES to the Venezuelan government in exchange for crude oil as of March 2019; the sanctions would make it difficult for Venezuela to restructure its US$20 billion debt with China.

The U.S. Treasury added sanctions to the Central Bank of Venezuela on 17 April 2019. Mnuchin stated that the sanction would "inhibit most Central Bank activities undertaken" by the Maduro administration, but "ensure that regular debit and credit card transactions can proceed and personal remittances and humanitarian assistance continue unabated". The new sanctions closed some loopholes that allowed for continued financing of the government; the Central Bank had been able to obtain loans without seeking approval from the National Assembly, and sold gold to the central banks of other countries. By interrupting the foreign exchange handled by the Central Bank, PDVSA purchases of production supplies were impacted.

The Venezuelan banking sanctions caused a ripple effect in that the New York Federal Reserve decided to restrict opening of new accounts in Puerto Rico's offshore banking industry, and planned tighter restrictions in that area.

===== CLAP food subsidy program =====
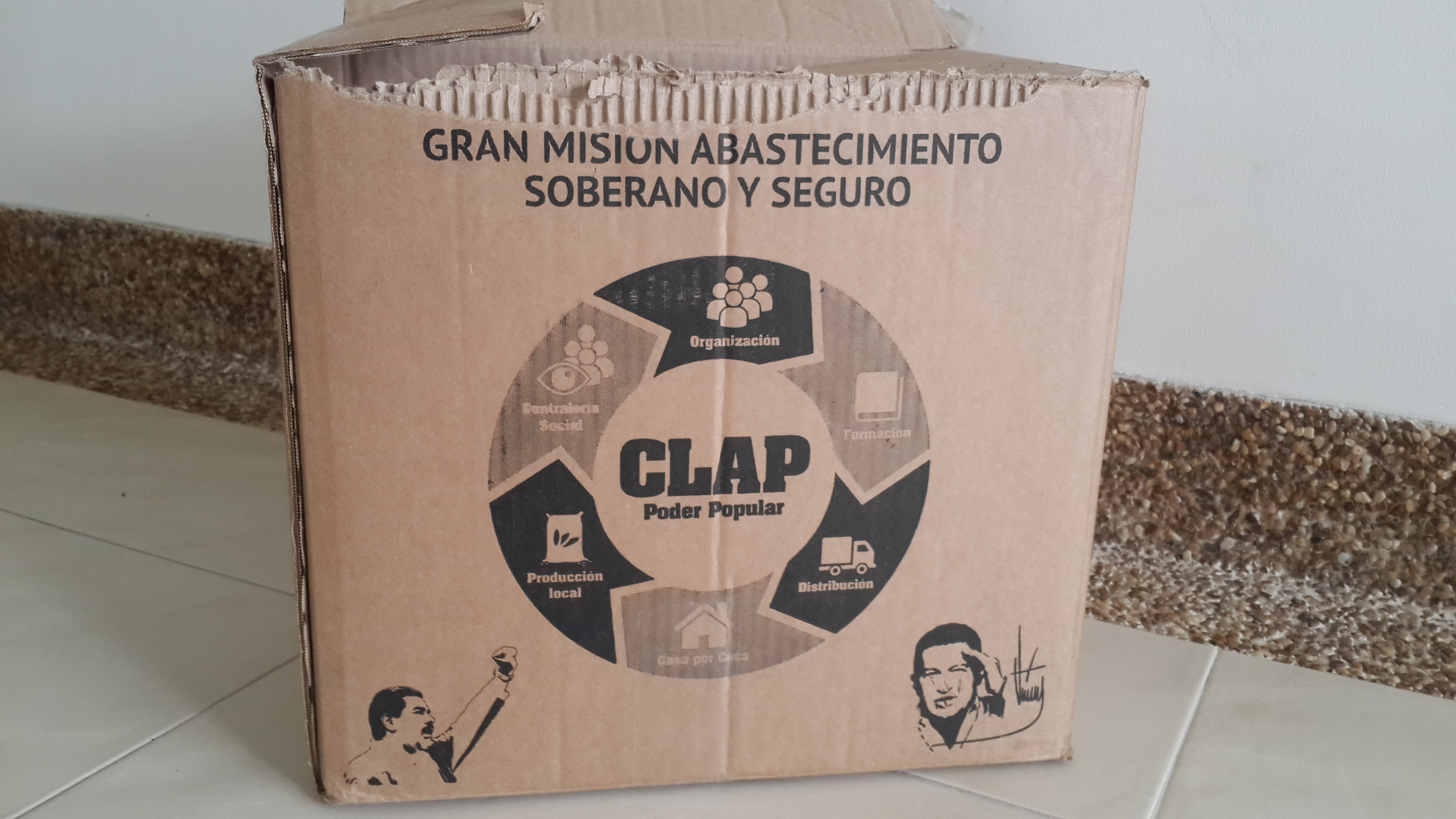
A food box provided by CLAP, with the supplier receiving government funds owned by President Maduro

On 25 July 2019, the U.S. Treasury Department sanctioned 13 companies involved in a Venezuelan food subsidy program called CLAP, along with 10 people including Maduro's stepsons and Colombian businessman Alex Saab. In 2017, the Venezuelan attorney general, Luisa Ortega Díaz, had named Saab as the owner of a Mexican firm that sold food to the CLAP.

According to Mnuchin, corruption in the "CLAP program has allowed Maduro and his family members to steal from the Venezuelan people" by using "food as a form of social control, to reward political supporters and punish opponents". Saab and another Colombian businessman were charged in the U.S. with money laundering related to a 2011–2015 scheme to pay bribes to take advantage of Venezuela's government-set exchange rate. U.S. Treasury Department officials had stated in April 2018 that Venezuelan officials pocketed 70% of the proceeds allocated for importation programs destined to alleviate hunger in Venezuela.

An April 2019 communication from the U.S. State Department highlighted the 2017 National Assembly investigation finding that the government paid US$42 for food boxes that cost under US$13, and that "Maduro's inner circle kept the difference, which totaled more than $200 million dollars in at least one case", adding that food boxes were "distributed in exchange for votes". On 17 September 2019, the U.S. Treasury Department expanded further sanctions on 16 entities and 3 individuals, accusing them of helping the Venezuelan government profit from food import and distribution.

===== Airline and aircraft =====
The U.S. sanctioned 15 PDVSA aircraft on 21 January 2020, stating that they had "been involved in the harassment of U.S. military flights in Caribbean airspace", and had been used to provide transport to sanctioned individuals.

Venezuela's state airline Conviasa (Consorcio Venezolano de Industrias Aeronáuticas y Servicios Aéreos) was blocked under Executive Order 13884 of 5 August 2019 that applied generally to property of the Government of Venezuela, but OFAC explicitly identified it and its fleet of 40 aircraft on the Specially Designated Nationals (SDN) list on 7 February 2020 to assure compliance.

The Biden Administration began relaxing sanctions on Conviasa in October 2023 under General License 45 for the purpose of deporting Venezuelan nationals from the U.S. General License 45A, issued in November 2023, further eased restrictions on Conviasa, allowing for maintenance of certain Embraer aircraft and was replaced by General License 45B on 29 February 2024, to allow for Venezuelans from non-U.S. jurisdictions to be repatriated.

In November 2023, the U.S. Bureau of Industry and Security named three companies that it said had circumvented sanctions by smuggling U.S. aviation parts to Venezuela.

On 2 September 2024, the U.S. seized Maduro's presidential airplane.

=== Sanctions relief ===
==== First sanctions relief (2022–2024) ====
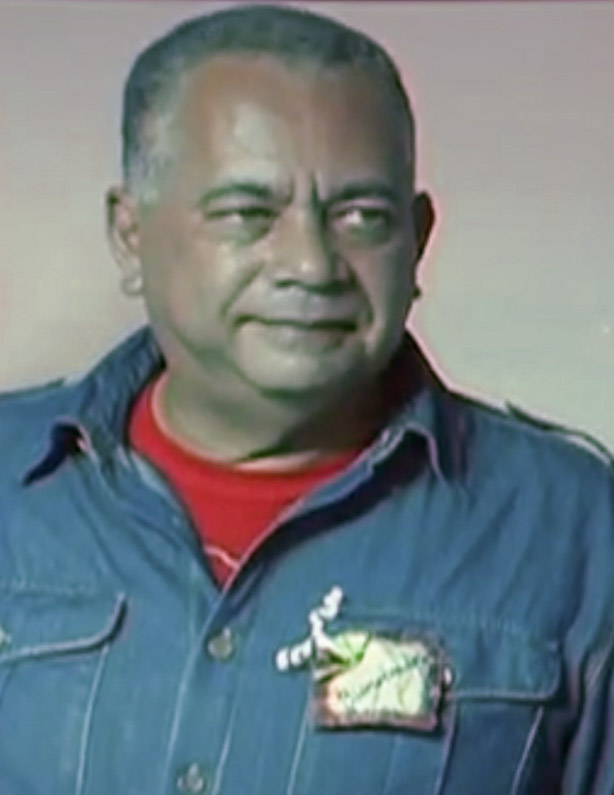
Elvis Amoroso, head of CNE, Venezuelan's electoral body, and former Comptroller General, sanctioned by Canada, the European Union, Panama, Switzerland and the United States

After Joe Biden took office, in 2022 his administration lowered some of the restrictions in the petroleum sector and allowed Chevron Corporation, which had existing investments in Venezuela, to increase production for sales to the U.S. Crude oil exports by July 2023, driven by Chevron and other new agreements allowed under sanctions, rose to their highest level in over three years. Countries like Cuba, China and Iran continued trading with Venezuela, and China become the main source of Venezuela's petroleum revenue in 2023.

In October 2023, the Biden administration eased some sanctions on the oil, gas and gold industries and secondary trading of bonds based on an election agreement signed in Barbados between the Maduro government and opposition parties. U.S. Secretary of State Antony Blinken stated Maduro would have another month to remove bans on candidates for the 2024 presidential election.

On 17 April 2024, the U.S. announced that some of these sanctions would be reinstated because the Barbados Agreement had not been fully honored and the leading opposition candidate María Corina Machado had not been allowed to run in presidential elections. Waivers to operate in spite of the sanctions were extended to companies with existing oil and gas assets and production in Venezuela; in addition to Chevron, these included Spain's Repsol, Italy's Eni, France's Maurel & Prom, and BP in Trinidad and Tobago,

After sanctions relief, Spain's 2024 imports through July of Venezuelan petroleum tripled from those of the same period in 2023. With Chevron telling the Biden Administration that it is important that it be allowed to continue operations in Venezuela, where it accounts for 20% of exports, and with Spain becoming a significant importer of Venezuelan petroleum, Venezuela's overall exports increased to the highest level in four years by August. A former PDVSA board member, Pedro Burelli, told The Wall Street Journal that: "Chevron ended up front-running all other interests the U.S. said it had with regard to Venezuela—democracy, the fight for human rights, migration and the fight against corruption".

Following the 2024 Venezuelan presidential election and the resulting political crisis, the U.S. imposed sanctions on 16 individuals on 12 September but did not impose additional sanctions in the petroleum sector; unnamed officials have stated that the Biden Administration was concerned that sanctions could lead to increased immigration or higher oil prices prior to the November 2024 U.S. elections.

==== Second sanctions relief (2026) ====
After the United States intervention in Venezuela and the capture of Nicolás Maduro. Most of Maduro administration remained in Venezuela, with vicepresident Delcy Rodríguez taking over as acting president of Venezuela. Rodríguez passed a new hydrocarbon law that allows private companies to participate in the oil industry. On 29 January, US Treasury's Office of Foreign Assets Control lifted various oil-related sanctions imposed on Venezuela, authorizing US companies to buy, sell, transport, store and refine Venezuelan crude oil. US sanctions on production of oil were not lifted. Trump administration also announced that additional sanctions will be lifted soon.

== Canada ==
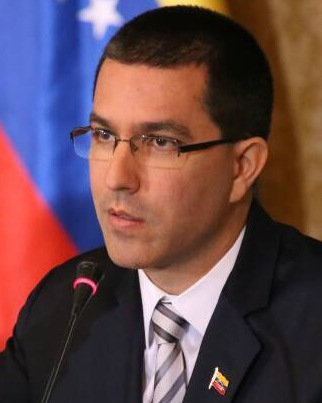
Jorge Arreaza, Maduro's Foreign Minister, sanctioned by Canada and the United States

Canada sanctioned 40 Venezuelan officials, including Maduro, in September 2017 for behaviors that undermined democracy after at least 125 people were killed in the 2017 protests and "in response to the government of Venezuela's deepening descent into dictatorship". Canadians were banned from transactions with the individuals, whose Canadian assets were frozen. The Canadian government held that Maduro played a "key role in [Venezuela's] political and economic crisis"; its sanctions targeted his cabinet, military officials, and the Supreme Tribunal of Justice and Electoral Council. Chrystia Freeland, Foreign Minister, said the sanctions were intended to pressure Maduro to "restore constitutional order and respect the democratic rights of the Venezuelan people".

The Canadian regulations of the Special Economic Measures Act prohibited dealings with listed persons subject to some exceptions.

=== November 2017 ===
On 23 November 2017, Canada added sanctions under the Justice for Victims of Corrupt Foreign Officials Act, stating the individuals were "responsible for, or complicit in, gross violations of internationally recognized human rights" and had "committed acts of significant corruption, or both". Three of the 19 individuals added to the Canadian list had already been sanctioned in September (Maduro, Tareck El Aissami and Gustavo González López), bringing to 56 the number of individuals sanctioned by Canada as of 2017.

=== May 2018 ===
Responding to the 2018 presidential elections, Canada sanctioned 14 more Venezuelans. Canada's Special Economic Measures (Venezuela) Regulations were amended on 30 May 2018 to account for the "economic, political and humanitarian crisis in Venezuela" that the Canadian statement said "moves [Venezuela] ever closer to full dictatorship". The government sanctioned Maduro's wife, Cilia Flores, and 13 other members of the ANC and TSJ.

=== April 2019 ===
In April 2019, Canada announced sanctions on 43 more individuals. The government statement said that high-ranking officials were sanctioned for "anti-democratic actions, particularly relating to the repression and persecution of the members of the interim government, censorship, and excessive use of force against civil society, undermining the independence of the judiciary and other democratic institutions." Foreign Minister Freeland stated that the "Maduro dictatorship" was responsible for the crisis.

The newly sanctioned Venezuelans included Jorge Arreaza, Maduro's Minister of Foreign Affairs.

=== January–March 2025 ===
Following the disputed July 2024 Venezuelan presidential election, Maduro was inaugurated for a third term as president on 10 January 2025; that day, Canada joined the U.S., E.U. and U.K. in applying new sanctions. Canada sanctioned 14 additional senior Venezuelan officials, stating that they had "engaged in activities that have directly or indirectly supported human rights violations in Venezuela".

In March 2025, Canada sanctioned eight government officials which they said had engaged in civil rights violations.

== European Union ==
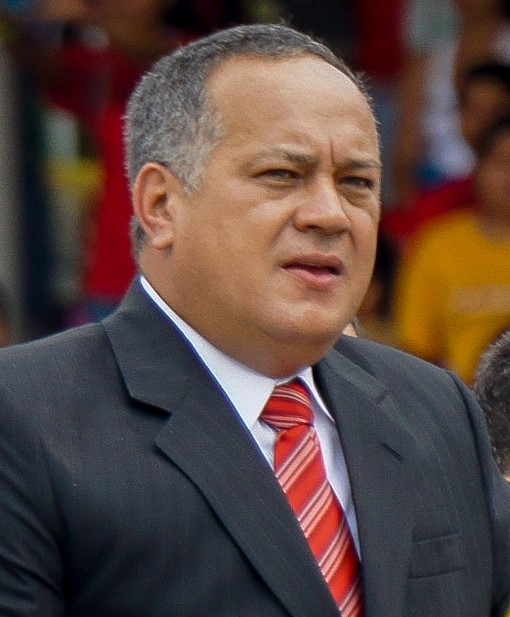
Diosdado Cabello, Constituent Assembly president, sanctioned by Canada, the European Union, Mexico, Panama, Switzerland, and the United States

In 2017, the E.U. approved an embargo on arms and material, adding Venezuela along with North Korea and Syria, to countries where European companies cannot sell material that may be used for repression. In 2018, those sanctions were continued for another year because of "human rights violations and undermining of democracy and the rule of law under President Nicolás Maduro".

The E.U. sanctioned seven Venezuela officials on 18 January 2018, stating they were responsible for deteriorating democracy in the country: Diosdado Cabello, Néstor Reverol (Interior Minister), Gustavo González López (Head of Intelligence), Antonio Benavides Torres (National Guard Commander), Tibisay Lucena (Head of Electoral Council), Maikel Moreno (Supreme Court President), and Tarek William Saab (Attorney General). The sanctioned individuals were prohibited from entering the nations of the E.U., and their assets were frozen. Cabello, known as number two in Chavismo, had not been sanctioned by the U.S. when the E.U. sanctioned him.

The Venezuelan government appealed the sanctions in the European General Court (EGC) in February 2018; the EGC dismissed the appeal on 20 September 2019.

On 25 June 2018, the E.U. sanctioned another eleven officials in response to the May 2018 Venezuelan presidential election, which it described as "neither free nor fair". The additional sanctions brought the total to 18 Venezuelans sanctioned in European nations. The sanctioned individuals included Tareck El Aissami (Vice President of Economy and Minister for Industry and Production, formerly SEBIN); Freddy Bernal (Head of Local Committees for Supply and Production and SEBIN commissioner); Elías Jaua (Minister of Education and former head of Presidential Commission for the ANC); and Delcy Rodríguez (Vice President).

Voice of America, an American state-backed news broadcaster, reported in April 2019 tension between the U.S. and the E.U. over increasing sanctions; E.U. nations were reluctant to apply sanctions to a nation, despite evidence that Russia's aid was propping up Maduro, but were considering tougher sanctions on individuals in his government. Spain was receiving Venezuelan oil in repayment for debt as of 10 April 2019 and many Spanish companies operated in Venezuela.

In June 2019, the Associated Press reported that the United Kingdom, France, Germany, Spain and the Netherlands were considering imposing sanctions on Maduro and several top officials for the crackdown on political opponents following the 30 April uprising. However, E.U. member states were divided over the timing of any action for fear of derailing a negotiated exit to the country's crisis.

The E.U. sanctioned seven intelligence and security officials in September 2019, taking what Reuters described as a more "severe tone" against torture and bringing to 25 the number of individuals sanctioned by the E.U. Those sanctioned were Alexander Granko, Rafael Antonio Franco Quintero, Carlos Calderón, Nestor Blanco Hurtado, Rafael Blanco Marrero, Alexis Escalona, and Hannover Guerrero.

The E.U. sanctioned eleven individuals on 29 June 2020. Disavowing the December 2020 Venezuelan parliamentary election, on 22 February 2021, the E.U. sanctioned 19 officials of the Maduro administration for what they characterized as violations of fundamental human rights and democratic principles.

In November 2023 the E.U. extended its Venezuelan sanctions through 14 May 2024, following earlier extensions. In its annual review in May 2024, intending to support dialogue ahead of the July 2024 Venezuelan presidential election, the E.U. made an exception and extended its restrictions through 10 January 2025 rather than the full year, recognizing the date the new president-elect would be sworn in. At the same time, the E.U. sought to incentivize free and fair elections, and temporarily lifted sanctions on Elvis Amoroso, head of CNE, the electoral body in Venezuela, and three former officials of that body, Socorro Hernández, Xavier Moreno and Leonardo Morales. Amoroso rejected that easing of restrictions, labeling it immoral, interference in Venezuela's elections and harassment, and demanding that sanctions on everyone in the country be lifted.

After the 2024 disputed elections and Maduro's inauguration for a third term as president on 10 January 2025, the E.U. joined other countries in applying new sanctions. The Council of the European Union sanctioned another 15 individuals, extended restrictive measures through 10 January 2026, and re-applied the restrictions they had removed in May 2024 on Elvis Amoroso, Socorro Hernández, Xavier Moreno and Leonardo Morales.

In December 2025, the E.U. again extended the sanctions from 10 January 2026 to 10 January 2027, stating that Maduro's government had taken "persistent actions undermining democracy and the rule of law, as well as continued human rights violations and the repression of civil society and democratic opposition, including in relation to the conduct of and developments following the Presidential Elections of 28 July 2024". As of 2025, the EU has sanctioned 69 Venezuelans comprising most of Maduro's inner circle.

== Other ==
=== Panama ===
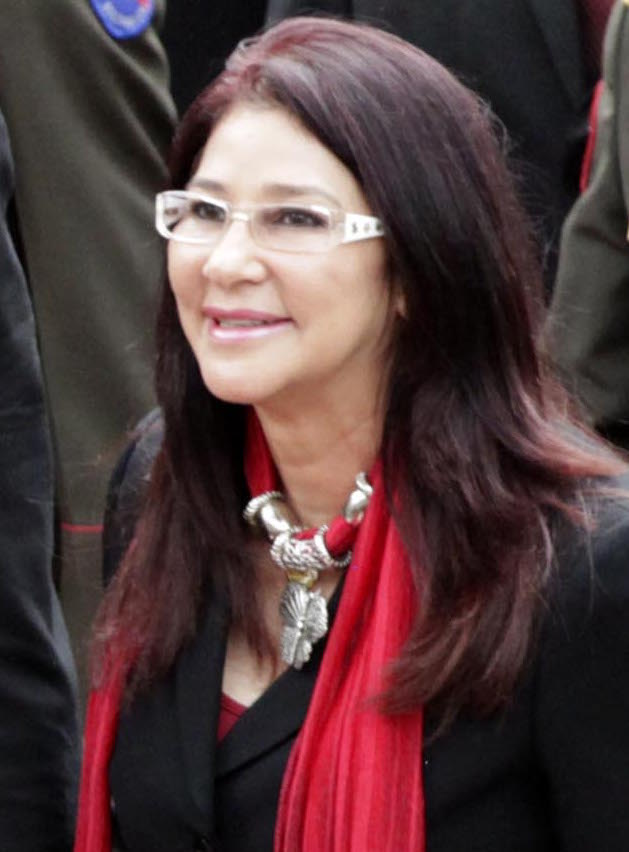
Cilia Flores, Maduro's wife, sanctioned by the U.S. and Canada; Panama sanctioned multiple Venezuelans and companies associated with family members of Flores.

On 27 March 2018, Panama sanctioned 55 public officials and 16 businesses that operate in Panama, related to the family of Maduro's wife, Cilia Flores. Panama thus become the first country in Latin America to sanction the Maduro administration, joining the U.S., Canada, the E.U. and Switzerland. The sanctioned businesses had members of the Malpica-Flores family on their boards of directors.

The sanctions imposed by Panama triggered a diplomatic crisis between the two countries, which ended on 26 April 2018, when Maduro and Panamanian President Juan Carlos Varela agreed to restore diplomatic relations.

=== Switzerland ===
Switzerland implemented sanctions against Venezuela on 28 March 2018, freezing the assets of seven ministers and high officials. The sanctions mimicked those of the E.U., expressing concern over individual freedoms, illegitimate elections, and separation of powers.

On 10 July 2018, Switzerland imposed sanctions against the eleven Venezuelans that were sanctioned by the E.U. in June 2018.

The Swiss sanctioned eleven more individuals in on 7 July 2020 for human rights violations.

Following the 3 January 2026 capture of Nicolás Maduro, the Swiss froze assets of Maduro and 36 people associated with him "to ensure that potentially illegally acquired assets cannot be transferred out of Switzerland".

=== Mexico ===
The Mexican Senate froze the assets of officials of the Maduro administration in April 2018 and prohibited them (Antonio Benavides Torres, Delcy Rodríguez, Diosdado Cabello, Maikel Moreno, Néstor Reverol, Tarek William Saab, and Tibisay Lucena) from entering Mexico.

In July 2019, the Mexican Ministry of Finance froze bank accounts of 19 companies related to the sale of low quality and over-priced food to the Venezuelan government's CLAP program and opened an investigation relating to money laundering after detecting "irregularities of more than 150 million dollars".

=== Curaçao ===
On 21 June 2019, Curaçao announced a gold import and transit ban on Venezuela. According to prime minister Eugene Rhuggenaath, criminal investigations indicated drug smuggling and money laundering were associated with the Venezuelan gold trade.

=== United Kingdom ===
After its exit from the E.U., the United Kingdom continued to issue sanctions aligned with the E.U. In July 2021 the U.K. issued a series of sanctions that included Colombian businessman Alex Saab, and the freezing of assets and travel bans. Álvaro Enrique Pulido, his associate, was also sanctioned—both for "exploiting two of Venezuela's public programs that were established to provide poor Venezuelans with affordable food and housing", stating that the men had inflated prices for personal enrichment, causing "more suffering to Venezuelans who were already in poverty".

Following Maduro's disputed inauguration for a third term as president on 10 January 2025, the U.K. joined the E.U., U.S. and Canada in applying new sanctions. The 15 new individuals sanctioned included the TSJ head and security and military officials held responsible by the UK for undermining democracy.

== Entry bans ==
=== Lima Group ===
After Maduro's second inauguration on 7 January 2019, the Lima Group (except Mexico) announced its member countries would follow Peru's decision to ban the entry of people linked with Maduro's administration. (Note: The Lima Group at the time was made up of Argentina, Brazil, Canada, Chile, Colombia, Costa Rica, Guatemala, Guyana, Honduras, Mexico, Panama, Paraguay, Peru and Saint Lucia.)

=== Colombia ===
Colombia did not directly sanction Venezuelans, rather banned figures close to Maduro from entering the country. Christian Krüger Sarmiento, director of Colombia Migration, announced in January 2019 that the Colombian government maintained a list of people banned from entering Colombia or subject to expulsion. The initial list had 200 people with a "close relationship and support for the Nicolás Maduro regime", but Krüger said it could change. The list—which was not disclosed in its entirely—was headed by Maduro, his wife Flores, Cabello, and Delcy Rodríguez and encompassed Venezuela's military leadership. The decision to ban collaborators of the Maduro administration from entering Colombia came after the Lima Group disavowed Maduro as the legitimate president of Venezuela.

The head of a company commissioned by the Maduro administration, Monómeros Colombovenezolanos, was not allowed to enter Colombia, nor was Omar Enrique, a Venezuelan singer seeking entry for a performance. Maduro's cousin, Argimiro Maduro Morán, and family were turned back when they sought refuge in Colombia during the 2019 Venezuelan blackouts. In March, Édgar Alejandro Lugo Pereira—an active military person working for Venezuela's Foreign Ministry—was detained and expelled; he was carrying US$14,000 and 20 passports.

Gustavo Petro ordered in September 2022 that Colombia's travel bans be removed.

=== Bolivia ===
On 4 January 2026, one day after the capture of Maduro by the United States, Bolivia imposed travel restrictions on members of the Venezuelan security forces and officials and former officials of the Maduro government.

== Evasion ==
Tareck El Aissami announced in October 2018 in response to U.S. sanctions that all foreign exchange government auctions would be quoted in euros, Chinese yuan and other hard currencies instead of U.S. dollars. He said the government would open bank accounts in Europe and Asia as potential workarounds to financial sanctions and that Venezuela's banking sector would be able to participate in currency auctions three times a week, adding that the government would sell some 2 billion euros amid a rebound in oil prices.

In January 2020, despite the entry ban imposed by the E.U., Maduro Vice President Delcy Rodríguez met in the guest area of the Madrid–Barajas Airport with Spain's minister José Luis Ábalos from the Spanish Socialist Workers' Party.

Following a five-year investigation of 30 Swiss banks for alleged corruption, as of 2021, five had been reprimanded by the Swiss Financial Market Supervisory Authority for laundering money linked to PDVSA, allowing "corrupt members of the Venezuelan government" to evade sanctions and transfer money to Switzerland.

Some ships' captains and owners sympathetic to Venezuela turned off their transponder locations to avoid the U.S. sanctions and deliver oil to Russia, China, and India, creating an environmental risk of ship collisions. As of 2020, Mexico defied the U.S. sanctions by allowing fuel shipments, and in spite of sanctions on both Iran and Venezuela, Iran sent five oil tankers to Venezuela.

Venezuela continued to send money and ship petroleum products to ally countries after sanctions were issued. In April 2022, it sent fuel oil and diesel to Cuba, and paid Saint Vincent and the Grenadines' debt with Petrocaribe, estimated to have been around $189 million. In August 2023, Petróleos de Venezuela increased fuel shipments to Cuba, from 53,000 barrels per day of petroleum products to 65,000 barrels.

Following an investigation by the F.B.I. of trading involving Mexican companies, in January 2021, the U.S. sanctioned a network comprising three people, fourteen companies and six ships for evading sanctions on Venezuelan petroleum products. Six months earlier, three Mexicans, eight Mexican-based companies and two ships were sanctioned.

== Analysis ==
=== Legality ===
In 2019, former UN rapporteur Alfred de Zayas said that US sanctions on Venezuela were illegal as they constituted economic warfare and "could amount to 'crimes against humanity' under international law". His report, which he says was ignored by the UN, was criticized by the Latin America and Caribbean programme director for the International Crisis Group for neglecting to mention the impact of a "difficult business environment on the country", which the director said "was a symptom of Chavismo and the socialist governments' failures", and that "Venezuela could not recover under current government policies even if the sanctions were lifted."

=== Impact ===
The Washington Office on Latin America (WOLA) said 78 Venezuelans associated with Maduro had been sanctioned by different countries as of March 2018. By September 2019, the Center for Strategic and International Studies said 119 Venezuelans had been sanctioned by several countries. As of 3 March 2025, the Atlantic Council's sanctions tracker listed 209 individuals with links to Venezuela sanctioned by the U.S., 123 by Canada, and 69 by the E.U.

Maduro and his administration have stated that the U.S. is responsible for the collapse of the Venezuelan economy. Maduro's Foreign Minister Arreaza said in 2019 that economic sanctions had cost the Venezuelan economy US$30 billion; a 2020 WOLA report agreed with that figure. Reporting on Arreaza's statement, the Associated Press said that Maduro was blocking aid on the premise that "Venezuelans are not beggars". After the 2020 U.S. sanctions on Luis Parra, Arreaza stated that the U.S. sanctions were undermining democratic institutions.

Guaidó stated in May 2019 that the sanctions had weakened a network of Cuban spies that he said operated in Venezuela. After the announcement of regional elections in 2021, Guaidó announced a "national salvation agreement" and proposed negotiation with Maduro with a schedule for free and fair elections and international support and observers, in exchange for lifting international sanctions.

Economists and news reports state that the crisis began, and shortages and high inflation existed in Venezuela, before the sanctions and that sanctions prior to 2019 targeted Maduro and Chavismo "elites" while having little impact on average Venezuelans. The Washington Post stated in April 2019 that "the deprivation long predates recently imposed US sanctions". The Wall Street Journal said in January 2019 that economists place the blame for Venezuela's economy shrinking by half on policies of the Maduro administration, "including widespread nationalizations, out-of-control spending that sparked inflation, price controls that led to shortages, and widespread graft and mismanagement". WOLA said that Venezuela "was already suffering from a years-long crisis" before the 2017 sanctions.

As the humanitarian crisis deepened and expanded, the Trump administration imposed more serious economic sanctions in 2017, and more in 2019. Some economists, scholars and non-governmental organizations state that the sanctions worsened the economic crisis, and limited income sources and public spending, considering that most of Venezuela's food and medicine is imported. In 2021, the US Government Accountability Office concluded that sanctions "likely contributed to Venezuela's economic decline". The report said that as a result of sanctions, Venezuela is selling less oil, at a higher cost and a lower price. In 2023, Al Jazeera wrote that the sanctions had affected citizens. In 2024, the Financial Times described the sanctions as "crippling".

Reuters stated that falling oil prices in 2020 during the COVID-19 recession, alongside the sanctions, contributed to fuel shortages in the country. A Transparencia Venezuela 2020 report stated that an "institutional, political, economic, social and environmental crisis" had "characterized Venezuela for more than a decade", caused by authoritarian administration, while noting that sanctions have impacted the economy. The Council on Foreign Relations called Venezuela "the archetype of a failed petrostate", and said that "oil continues to play the dominant role in the country's fortunes". It said that the fall in oil prices since 2014, due to the 2010s oil glut, "sent Venezuela into an economic and political spiral". Other reports also cited government mismanagement as the cause of or factors in the decline.

In March 2019, Michelle Bachelet, Office of the United Nations High Commissioner for Human Rights, stated after a five-person delegation visited Venezuela that the government had not acknowledged or addressed the dramatically deteriorating conditions, and she was concerned that although the serious, long-standing crisis pre-dated the early sanctions, the new sanctions could worsen the situation. Two United Nations special rapporteurs had earlier criticized the U.S. sanctions as "economic warfare", stating that their use to "overthrow an elected government is in violation of all norms of international law". In early 2021, Alena Douhan, UN special rapporteur, visited Venezuela; 66 Venezuelan NGOs asked her to consider the harmful impact of sanctions in the context of years of repression, corruption and economic mismanagement. In her preliminary report, Douhan said that the economic pressure against Venezuela worsened the crisis, but that Venezuela's economic decline "began in 2014 with the fall in oil prices" and that "mismanagement and corruption had also contributed". She asked the U.S., U.K. and Portugal to release an estimated $6 billion in frozen Venezuelan foreign assets. The government welcomed the report, while the opposition accused her of "playing into the hands of the regime". Douhan's report was criticized, and some NGOs manifested on social media with the hashtag "#Lacrisisfueprimero" (The crisis came first). In 2023, Douhan stated that the sanctions on PDVSA deprived Venezuela's budget of 99% of its external revenue, crippling the country's social programs.

Christopher Sabatini, the senior research fellow for Latin America at Chatham House, said in a July 2023 Foreign Policy article that as a result of sanctions, Western investors and institutions were either forbidden or discouraged from purchasing Venezuelan debt, and that the share migrated to "shadowy holders" via the United Arab Emirates and Turkey, among others, suspected to be fronts from buyers from China, Iran, Russia and other US rivals. Swiss hedge fund Mangart Capital estimated that the debt held by US interests decreased from 75% in 2017 to between 35% and 40% in 2023. Sabatini argued that as a result the new bondholders could prevent a democratic transition of the country and prevent it from entering global capital exchanges in the future.

Venezuelan economist Francisco Rodríguez said, "If it had not been for sanctions, Venezuela would have experienced a large economic crisis in the last decade, but it would have been more like other large economic crises in Latin America and even in prior Venezuela history (...) It wouldn't have been like what we've seen."

=== Impact on food, medicine and health ===
A 2019 joint report published by Human Rights Watch (HRW) and Johns Hopkins Bloomberg School of Public Health stated that most sanctions were focused on abusive officials involved in corruption, did not target the economy, and that the 2017 sanctions allowed exceptions for food and medicine. Consulting firm ANOVA Policy Research stated in 2021 that the sanctions were linked to a decrease in monthly oil production, and increases in monthly food and medicine imports; it found no evidence of negative effects on food and medicine imports, but wrote that the economic data did not account for price controls on imported products being abandoned in 2017. In 2018, Susana Raffalli had stated that 36% of Venezuelan children had stunted growth prior to sanctions; she cited the PDVAL affair (tons of imported food supplies found rotten during Hugo Chávez's government) as an example of food shortages before sanctions.

The Lancet journal editors noted in 2019 that Maduro had used food as a political weapon and resisted humanitarian aid, and that the U.S. had reacted with sanctions that they said resulted in collateral food and medicine shortages. The editors called for the involvement of non-governmental entities to provide distribution of food and medicine, and for the Venezuelan government to allow them to do so, and stated that the UN Human Rights Council considers economic sanctions a violation of human rights.

An April 2019 report by Mark Weisbrot and Jeffrey Sachs claimed that a 31% rise in deaths between 2017 and 2018 was due to the 2017 sanctions, and that 40,000 people in Venezuela may have died as a result; Weisbrot stated that he "could not prove those excess deaths were the result of sanctions, but said the increase ran parallel to the imposition of the measures and an attendant fall in oil production". The Independent wrote that similar concerns had been raised earlier by UN representatives. The report's findings and methodology were described as invalid and disputed by other economists, La Patilla, the US State department, and the Brookings Institution, who stated that most of the decline pre-dated the sanctions and that the methodology was flawed or speculative. Opposition-aligned academic and Guaido appointee Ricardo Hausmann and Frank Muci published a rebuttal in Americas Quarterly, stating that the analysis took Colombia as a counterfactual for Venezuela, when Colombia and Venezuela are "radically different in other dimensions". They argued that oil production trends between the two nations were different in the decade before sanctions and that a month after the 2017 sanctions, Maduro replaced the PDVSA president with an inexperienced military general who restructured the oil entity, worsening its performance.

=== Public perception ===
Polling in 2023 by Datanalisis found that 74% of Venezuelans do not support sanctions, 30% attribute Venezuela's problems to the sanctions, and half of Venezuelans agree with the sanctions on some administration officials. The director of Datanalisis stated that most Venezuelans recognize the government's blame for the sanctions, but have moved away from supporting them because their objectives have not been achieved and have worsened the lives of citizens. A poll by DatinCorp conducted among Venezuelans in 2019 found that 68% believed that the sanctions have affected their quality of life.

== Persons sanctioned ==
Legend: G – Government officials; S – Active or retired military or security officials; O – Other; Person no longer sanctioned

Date first sanctioned		Name	Summary	Sanctioned by					
Date first sanctioned		Name	Summary	US	Can	EU	Swi	Pan	Mex
G	2017-07-31	Nicolás Maduro	Former President of Venezuela, in U.S. custody since 3 January 2026						
S	2015-03-09	Antonio José Benavides	Commander in the armed forces and former leader of the National Guard						
G	2011-09-08	Freddy Bernal	Minister of Urban Agriculture, heads Local Committees for Supply and Production (CLAP), also sanctioned 9 November 2017, previously sanctioned under Foreign Narcotics Kingpin Designation Act						
G	2017-09-22	Diosdado Cabello	President of the ANC, Vice President of the United Socialist Party of Venezuela (PSUV), Chavismo's number two person						
S	2015-03-09	Gustavo González López	Director General of Bolivarian Intelligence Service (SEBIN)						
G	2015-03-09	Katherine Haringhton	National-level prosecutor						
G	2017-09-22	Socorro Elizabeth Hernández	National Electoral Council (CNE) Rector and member of National Electoral Board			(Note: On 13 May 2024, prior restrictions were temporarily eased on four rectors of the CNE: Elvis Amoroso, Socorro Hernández, Xavier Moreno and Leonardo Morales. They were reinstated on 10 January 2025.)			
G	2017-07-26	Elías Jaua	Presidential Commission for the ANC, Minister of Education, Minister of Foreign Affairs (former), Vice president (former)						
G	2017-07-26	Tibisay Lucena d. 2023-04-12	President of National Electoral Council (CNE)						
G	2017-05-18	Maikel Moreno	Supreme Tribunal of Justice (TSJ)						
G	2017-09-22	Sandra Oblitas Ruzza	Vice President and Rector of CNE						
G	2017-07-26	Néstor Reverol	Minister of Interior, Justice and Peace former Commander General of Venezuelan National Guard (GNB); US indictment for drug conspiracy (2016)						
S	2017-07-26	Sergio José Rivero	Commander General of the Bolivarian National Guard (GNB)						
G	2017-09-22	Delcy Rodríguez	Acting president (as of 2026), former vice president, sister of Jorge Rodríguez						
G	2017-07-26	Tarek William Saab	Ombudsman and President of Moral Council						
G	2008-09-12	Hugo Carvajal	Former director of military intelligence (DGIM), arrested in Spain on 12 April 2019 based on US warrant						
G	2008-09-12	Henry Rangel Silva	Director National Directorate of Intelligence and Prevention Services (DISIP)						
G	2008-09-12	Ramón Rodríguez Chacín	Minister of the Interior (former)						
S	2011-09-08	Cliver Alcalá	Major General Fourth Armored Division Venezuelan Army						
O	2011-09-08	Amilcar Jesus Figueroa Salazar	Member Latin American Parliament (Parlamento Latinamericano)						
S	2011-09-08	Ramón Isidro Madriz Moreno	Officer intelligence service (SEBIN)						
S	2015-03-09	Manuel Gregorio Bernal Martínez	Director General of SEBIN (former)						
S	2015-03-09	Justo José Noguera Pietri	General Commander of National Guard (former); Governor Bolivar State						
S	2015-03-09	Manuel Eduardo Pérez Urdaneta	Director of the Bolivarian National Police (PNB), Deputy Minister of Interior and Justice						
S	2015-03-09	Miguel Alcides Vivas Landino	Inspector General of the Venezuelan armed forces						
G	2017-02-13	Tareck El Aissami	Minister of Industries and National Production, former Vice President						
O	2017-02-13	Samark José Lopez Bello	Business associate of Tareck El Aissami						
G	2017-05-18	Arcadio de Jesús Delgado Rosales	TSJ						
G	2017-05-18	Luis Fernando Damiani Bustillos	TSJ Judge			(also UK)			
G	2017-05-18	Gladys Gutiérrez	TSJ						
G	2017-05-18	Juan José Mendoza Jover	TSJ						
G	2017-05-18	Calixto Antonio Ortega Rios	Magistrate (de facto) of the TSJ			(also UK)			
G	2017-05-18	Lourdes Benicia Suarez Anderson	TSJ Judge			(also UK)			
G	2017-05-18	Carmen Zuleta	TSJ						
G	2017-07-26	Rocco Albisinni Serrano	President of National Center for Foreign Commerce (CENCOEX)						
G	2017-07-26	Alejandro Antonio Fleming Cabrera	Vice Minister of Foreign Affairs, former President of CENCOEX						
S	2017-07-26	Franklin Horacio García Duque	Former Director of the Venezuelan National Police (PNB)						
G	2017-07-26	Carlos Erik Malpica Flores	Former National Treasurer and former Vice President of Finance for PDVSA, nephew of Cilia Flores						
S	2017-07-26	Carlos Alfredo Pérez Ampueda	National Director of PNB						
S	2017-07-26	Jesús Suárez Chourio	General Commander of the Army, formerly head of President's Protection and Security Unit						
G	2017-07-26	Maria Iris Varela Range	ANC and Prisons Minister						
G	2017-07-26	Simón Alejandro Zerpa Delgado	Finance VP for PDVSA, President of BANDES, Central Bank Director						
G	2017-08-09	Francisco Ameliach	ANC						
G	2017-08-09	Adán Chávez	ANC, brother of Hugo Chávez						
G	2017-08-09	Tania D'Amelio Cardiet	Rector of CNE who defended the ANC			(also UK)			
G	2017-08-09	Hermann Escarrá	ANC						
G	2017-08-09	Erika Farías	ANC, Libertador Bolivarian Municipality mayor of Caracas						
S	2017-08-09	Bladimir Lugo	Commander of the Special Unit to the Federal Legislative Palace of Bolivarian National Guard involved in assault on National Assembly						
G	2017-08-09	Carmen Meléndez	ANC, Lara state governor, Navy admiral, former Minister of Interior and Justice and Chief of Staff for Maduro's cabinet						
G	2017-08-09	Darío Vivas d. 2020-08-13	ANC						
G	2017-09-22	Susana Barreiros	Judge involved in Leopoldo López case						
G	2017-09-22	Pedro Carreño	ANC, former Interior Minister						
S	2017-09-22	Remigio Ceballos	Armed Forces						
G	2017-09-22	Roy Chaderton	Former Foreign Minister and ambassador						
G	2017-09-22	Manuel Enrique Galindo Ballesteros	ex-Comptroller						
G	2017-09-22	Aristóbulo Istúriz d. 2021-04-27	ANC, Education Minister, former Vice President						
G	2017-09-22	Andrés Eloy Méndez González	Former director of CONATEL						
S	2017-09-22	Vladimir Padrino López	Minister of Defense						
G	2017-09-22	Jorge Rodríguez	Minister of Communications and Information, Vice President of Communication and Culture, brother of Delcy Rodríguez						
G	2017-11-09	Manuel Ángel Fernández Meléndez	President of National Telephone Company (CANTV) and subsidiary Movilnet						
G	2017-11-09	Elvis Amoroso	Second Vice President of the ANC; President of the Republican Moral Council; Comptroller General of the Republic			(Note: On 13 May 2024, prior restrictions were temporarily eased on four rectors of the CNE: Elvis Amoroso, Socorro Hernández, Xavier Moreno and Leonardo Morales. They were reinstated on 10 January 2025.)			
G	2017-11-09	Jorge Elieser Márquez	Minister of the Office of the Presidency, former Director General of the National Telecommunications Commission (CONATEL)						
G	2017-11-09	Carlos Osorio Zambrano	President of Superior Organ of the Transport Mission, former Minister of the Office of the Presidency						
G	2017-11-09	Carlos Enrique Quintero Cuevas	CNE Vice president			(also UK)			
G	2017-11-09	Isaías Rodríguez d. 2025-01-12	Venezuelan Ambassador to Italy, former Second Vice President of the ANC						
G	2017-11-09	Ernesto Villegas	Minister of Culture, former Minister of Communication and Information, former President of Venezolana de Television (VTV)						
G	2017-11-23	José David Cabello	President of SENIAT, national tax authority, Diosdado Cabello's brother						
G	2017-11-23	Argenis Chávez	Barinas State Governor, brother of Hugo Chávez						
G	2017-11-23	Eulogio Del Pino	Former Oil Minister						
S	2017-11-23	Rodolfo Marco Torres	Governor of Aragua State, director on the board of% directors of PDVSA, former Minister of Food, retired General National Bolivarian Armed Forces						
G	2017-11-23	Nelson Merentes	Former president of Central Bank						
G	2017-11-23	Ricardo Molina	Housing Minister						
S	2017-11-23	Luis Motta Domínguez	Major General National Guard, Former Minister of Electrical Energy, Former President of the National Electric Corporation (CORPOELEC)						
G	2017-11-23	Rafael Ramírez Carreño	Former Minister of Energy, Permanent Representative of Venezuela to the UN, Minister of Foreign Affairs, president of PDVSA						
G	2017-11-23	José Vicente Rangel Ávalos	Mayor of Sucre						
S	2017-11-23	Francisco Rangel Gómez	Former Governor of Bolivar State, retired Army Division General						
G	2017-11-23	Luis Reyes Reyes	Former governor of Lara State						
G	2017-11-23	José Vielma Mora	Former governor of Tachira State						
S	2018-01-05	Gerardo José Izquierdo Torres	Major General of the Army						
S	2018-01-05	Fabio Enrique Zavarse Pabón	Division General of National Guard						
G	2018-03-19	William Antonio Contreras	Head of the Superintendency for the Defense of Socioeconomic Rights (SUNDDE), responsible for imposing price controls, Central Bank Director						
G	2018-03-19	Nelson Reinaldo Lepaje Salazar	Head of the Office of the National Treasury						
G	2018-03-19	Américo Alex Mata García	Alternate Director for National Bank of Housing and Habitat, former Vice Minister of Agricultural Economics						
G	2018-03-19	Carlos Alberto Rotondaro Cova	Former President of Venezuelan Institute of Social Security (IVSS)	X mark					
G	2018-05-18	Marleny Contreras	Tourism Minister, Diosdado Cabello's wife						
O	2018-05-18	Rafael Alfredo Sarría Diaz	Business associate of Diosdado Cabello						
G	2018-05-30	Indira Alfonzo	TSJ judge						
G	2018-05-30	Tania Díaz	First vice-president ANC						
G	2018-05-30	Cilia Flores; In U.S. custody since 3 January 2026	ANC, former First Lady of Venezuela						
G	2018-05-30	Malaquías Gil Rodríguez	TSJ, Vice-president			(also UK)			
G	2018-05-30	Jhannett María Madriz Sotillo	TSJ judge						
G	2018-05-30	Fanny Beatriz Márquez Cordero	TSJ Vice president			(also UK)			
G	2018-05-30	Xavier Antonio Moreno Reyes	Secretary-General of the National Electoral Council of Venezuela (CNE)			(Note: On 13 May 2024, prior restrictions were temporarily eased on four rectors of the CNE: Elvis Amoroso, Socorro Hernández, Xavier Moreno and Leonardo Morales. They were reinstated on 10 January 2025.)			
G	2018-05-30	Carolys Helena Pérez González	ANC sub-secretary						
G	2018-05-30	Fidel Ernesto General Vásquez Iriarte	Director of Executive Vice-presidency of the Republic						
G	2018-05-30	Christian Tyrone Zerpa	Former TSJ judge, defected to US						
S	2018-06-25	Ivan Hernandez Dala	Commander of Presidential Guard and Military Counterintelligence, DGCIM						
O	2018-09-25	José Omar Paredes	Chief pilot of sanctioned AVERUCA						
O	2018-09-25	Edgar Alberto Sarría Diaz	Director and CEO of sanctioned companies						
G	2019-01-08	Claudia Patricia Diaz Guillen	Former national Treasurer, married to Velásquez Figueroa						
O	2019-01-08	Leonardo González Dellan	Frontman and ex-president of Banco Industrial de Venezuela						
O	2019-01-08	Raúl Gorrín	President of Globovisión; US indictment for violating Foreign Corrupt Practices Act						
O	2019-01-08	Gustavo Adolfo Perdomo Rosales	Gorrin's brother-in-law						
O	2019-01-08	María Alexandra Perdomo Rosales	Gorrin's wife, sanctions removed in March	X mark					
O	2019-01-08	Mayela Antonina Tarascio-Perez de Perdomo	Gustavo Perdomo's wife, sanctions removed in March	X mark					
O	2019-01-08	Adrián José Velásquez Figueroa	Under house arrest in Spain, allegedly received bribes						
S	2019-02-15	Rafael Enrique Bastardo Mendoza	Commander of Police Special Actions Force (FAES)						
S	2019-02-15	Manuel Cristopher Figuera	Former Director General of Venezuelan National Intelligence Service, SEBIN	X mark	X mark				
G	2019-02-15	Manuel Salvador Quevedo Fernández	President of state-owned PDVSA and Minister of Petroleum and Mining, Brigadier General						
S	2019-02-15	Hildemaro José Rodríguez Múcura	First Commissioner of SEBIN						
G	2019-02-25	Ramón Carrizales	Apure state governor						
G	2019-02-25	Jorge García Carneiro d. 2021-05-22	Vargas state governor						
G	2019-02-25	Rafael Alejandro Lacava Evangelista	Carabobo state governor						
G	2019-02-25	Omar Prieto	Zulia state governor						
S	2019-03-01	Alberto Mirtiliano Bermudez Valderrey	Division General for Integral Defense Zone in Bolivar State						
S	2019-03-01	José Miguel Domínguez Ramírez	Chief Commissioner of the FAES in Tachira State former Director of Operations of FAES						
S	2019-03-01	Richard Jesús López Vargas	Major General and Commanding General Venezuelan National Guard (GNB)						
S	2019-03-01	Jesús Maria Mantilla Oliveros	Major General and Commander of Strategic Integral Defense Region Guayana						
S	2019-03-01	Cristhiam Abelardo Morales Zambrano	Director of the PNB and GNB colonel						
S	2019-03-01	José Leonardo Norono Torres	Division General and Commander for the Integral Defense Zone in Tachira State						
G	2019-03-19	Adrián Antonio Perdomo Mata	President of Minerven						
G	2019-04-12	María Carolina Ameliach Villarroel	TSJ						
G	2019-04-12	Jorge Arreaza	Foreign Minister						
G	2019-04-12	Víctor Hugo Cano Pacheco	Ministry of Mining						
G	2019-04-12	Bárbara Gabriela César Siero	Judge, TSJ						
S	2019-04-12	Giuseppe Alessandro Martín Alessandrello Cimadevilla	Navy Commander						
G	2019-04-12	Larry Devoe Márquez	Secretary Office of Human Rights						
G	2019-04-12	María Alejandra Díaz	ANC						
G	2019-04-12	Inocencio Antonio Figueroa Arizaleta	TSJ Judge			(also UK)			
G	2019-04-12	Eulalia Guerrero Rivero	Judge, TSJ						
G	2019-04-12	Earle Herrera	ANC						
S	2019-04-12	Carlos Augusto Leal Tellería	Commander, National Bolivarian Militia of Venezuela; Food Minister						
G	2019-04-12	Marco Antonio Medina	Judge, TSJ						
S	2019-04-12	José Miguel Montoya Rodríguez	National Guard General						
G	2019-04-12	Reinaldo Muñoz Pedroza	Solicitor, former SENIAT						
S	2019-04-12	José Ornella Ferreira	Commander National guard, Presidential Guard						
G	2019-04-12	Luis Eduardo Ortega Morales	CONATEL						
G	2019-04-12	Eduardo Piñate	Labor Ministry						
G	2019-04-12	Gladys del Valle Requena	Second vice-president of ANC						
G	2019-04-12	José Rivas	Mayor of Tinaco						
G	2019-04-12	Alfredo Ruiz Angulo	Defensoría del Pueblo						
G	2019-04-12	Franco Silva Avila	CANTV						
G	2019-04-17	Iliana Ruzza	Central Bank Director						
G	2019-04-26	Carol Padilla	First Special Court of First Instance in Control Functions, Substitute judge of the Court of Appeals of the criminal judicial circuit of Caracas						
G	2019-06-27	Eustiquio José Lugo Gómez	Deputy Minister of Finance, Investment, and Strategic Alliances for the Ministry of Electric Power						
G	2019-06-28	Nicolás Maduro Guerra	ANC, Corps of Inspectors of the Venezuelan Presidency, Son of Nicolás Maduro						
S	2019-07-19	Rafael Ramón Blanco Marrero	DGCIM former deputy director						
S	2019-07-19	Rafael Antonio Franco Quintero	Bolivarian Intelligence Service (SEBIN) agent DGCIM Director of Investigations (former)						
S	2019-07-19	Alexander Enrique Granko Arteaga	DGCIM Special Affairs Unit, GNB						
S	2019-07-19	Hannover Esteban Guerrero Mijares	DGCIM former Director of Investigations						
O	2019-07-25	Walter Jacob Gavidia Flores	Stepson of Nicolás Maduro						
O	2019-07-25	Yosser Daniel Gavidia Flores	Stepson of Nicolás Maduro						
O	2019-07-25	Mariana Andrea Staudinger Lemoine	Wife of Yosser Daniel Flores						
O	2019-07-25	Yoswal Alexander Gavidia Flores	Stepson of Nicolás Maduro						
O	2019-07-25	Alex Saab	Colombian businessman, in US custody since October 2021						
O	2019-07-25	Isham Ali Saab Certain	Son of Alex Saab						
O	2019-07-25	Shadi Nain Saab Certain	Son of Alex Saab, served as director of Group Grand Limited from 2015 to 2017						
O	2019-07-25	Alvaro Enrique Pulido Vargas	Colombian business owner and associate of Alex Saab						
O	2019-07-25	Emmanuel Enrique Rubio Gonzalez	Son of Alvaro Pulido Vargas						
O	2019-09-17	Amir Luis Saab Moran	Brother of Alex Saab						
O	2019-09-17	Luis Alberto Saab Moran	Brother of Alex Saab						
O	2019-09-17	David Nicolás Rubio González	Son of Alvaro Pulido Vargas, brother of Emmanuel Enrique Rubio Gonzalez						
G	2019-09-27	Alexis Enrique Escalona Marrero	Chief in Charge of the National Office Against Organized Crime and Terrorist Financing (ONDOFT); National Commander of National Anti-Extortion and Kidnapping Command (CONAS)						
S	2019-09-27	Néstor Blanco Hurtado	General of the Bolivarian National Guard (GNB)						
S	2019-09-27	Carlos Alberto Calderón Chirinos	Deputy Director of Bolivarian Intelligence Service (SEBIN)						
G	2020-01-13	Luis Parra	National Assembly						
G	2020-01-13	José Brito	National Assembly						
G	2020-01-13	Franklyn Duarte	National Assembly						
G	2020-01-13	Negal Manuel Morales Llovera	National Assembly						
G	2020-01-13	José Gregorio Noriega Figueroa	National Assembly						
G	2020-01-13	Conrado Antonio Pérez Linares	National Assembly						
G	2020-01-13	Adolfo Superlano	National Assembly						
O	2020-02-18	Didier Casimiro	Chairman of the board of directors and president of Rosneft Trading S.A.	X mark					
O	2020-06-18	Veronica Esparza Garcia	Companies Libre Abordo and Schlager Business Group						
O	2020-06-18	Joaquin Leal Jimenez	Coordinating between companies Libre Abordo, Schlager Business Group, and PdVSA						
O	2020-06-18	Olga Maria Zepeda Esparza	Companies Libre Abordo and Schlager Business Group						
G	2020-07-07	Farik Karin Mora Salcedo	DCGIM prosecutor						
G	2020-07-07	Dinorah Yoselin Bustamante Puerta	DCGIM prosecutor						
O	2020-07-23	Ricardo José Moron Hernandez	Friend of Maduro's son, active in gold mining sector						
O	2020-07-23	Santiago José Moron Hernandez	Friend of Maduro's son, active in gold mining sector						
G	2020-09-22	Miguel Antonio Jose Ponente Parra	Chief of staff to Luis Eduardo Parra Rivero						
G	2020-09-22	Guillermo Antonio Luces Osorio	Alleged involvement in Operation Scorpion (Operación Alacrán), a vote-buying bribery scheme						
G	2020-09-22	Jose Bernabe Gutierrez	"Expelled from Accion Democratica in June 2020 for conspiring with the Maduro regime to force AD to join a false opposition"						
G	2020-09-22	Chaim Jose Bucaran Paraguan	"UNT deputy in the AN until he was expelled from the party in January 2020 for participating in a Maduro regime effort to elect a pro-regime deputy as AN Speaker by physically preventing many opposition deputies from voting"						
G	2020-09-22	Williams José Benavides Rondón	ad hoc President of Tupamaro party						
O	2020-12-18	Marcos Javier Machado Requena	Worked with Ex-Cle Soluciones Biometricas CA on 2020 elections						
O	2020-12-18	Guillermo Carlos San Agustin	Worked with Ex-Cle Soluciones Biometricas CA on 2020 elections						
O	2021-01-19	Philipp Apikian	Owner and director of Swissoil	X mark					
O	2021-01-19	Alessandro Bazzoni	Owner of Elemento Oil and Gas Ltd and others	X mark					
O	2021-01-19	Francisco Javier D'Agostino Casado	Owner of companies that coordinated purchase and sale of crude oil for PDVSA	X mark					
G	2021-02-22	René Alberto Degraves Almarza	TSJ						
G	2021-02-22	Leonardo Enrique Morales Poleo	CNE			(Note: On 13 May 2024, prior restrictions were temporarily eased on four rectors of the CNE: Elvis Amoroso, Socorro Hernández, Xavier Moreno and Leonardo Morales. They were reinstated on 10 January 2025.)			
G	2021-02-22	Carlos Ramón Enrique Carvallo Guevara	Deputy director of DCGIM, president of Corporación Ecosocialista Ezequiel Zamora, S.A (Corpoez)						
G	2021-02-22	Jesús Emilio Vásquez Quintero	Attorney General of the Military Prosecutor's Office						
G	2021-02-22	Carlos Enrique Terán Hurtado	Brigadier General and head of criminal investigation unit of DGCIM						
G	2021-02-22	Douglas Rico	Director of the Scientific, Penal, and Criminal Investigation Corps (CICPC)						
G	2024-09-12	Juan Carlos Hidalgo Pandares	TSJ Judge			(UK)			
G	2024-09-12	Caryslia Rodríguez	TSJ President			(also UK)			
G	2024-09-12	Edward Miguel Briceño Cisneros	Judge that issued arrest warrant for Edmundo González						
G	2024-09-12	Luis Ernesto Dueñez Reyes	Prosecutor that sought arrest warrant for Edmundo González						
G	2024-09-12	Rosalba Gil Pacheco	CNE Rector			(also UK)			
G	2024-09-12	Antonio José Meneses Rodríguez	CNE Secretary-General						
G	2024-09-12	Pedro José Infante Aparicio	National Assembly first vice-president						
S	2024-09-12	Asdrúbal José Brito Hernandez	DCGIM Director of Criminal Investigations			(also UK)			
S	2024-09-12	Elio Ramón Estrada Paredes	GNB Commander			(also UK)			
S	2024-09-12	Domingo Antonio Hernández Lárez	Bolivarian National Armed Forces Commander			(also UK)			
S	2024-09-12	Johan Alexander Hernández Lárez	GNB Commander						
S	2024-09-12	Miguel Antonio Muñoz Palacios	SEBIN Deputy director			(also UK)			
S	2024-11-27	Dilio Guillermo Rodriguez Diaz	FANB, REDI commander (Strategic Regions for Integral Defense)						
S	2024-11-27	Jose Yunior Herrera Duarte	GNB						
S	2024-11-27	Carlos Eduardo Aigster Villamizar	FANB, ZODI commander						
S	2024-11-27	Jesus Rafael Villamizar Gomez	FANB, ZODI, REDI						
S	2024-11-27	Angel Daniel Balestrini Jaramillo	FANB, ZODI						
S	2024-11-27	Pablo Ernesto Lizano Colmenter	FANB, ZODI						
S	2024-11-27	Luis Gerardo Reyes Rivero	FANB, ZODI						
S	2024-11-27	Jose Alfredo Rivera Bastardo	GNB						
S	2024-11-27	Alberto Alexander Matheus Melendez	GNB						
S	2024-11-27	Jesus Ramon Fernandez Alayon	GNB						
S	2024-11-27	Ruben Dario Santiago Servigna	BNP Brigadier General						
S	2024-11-27	Alexis Jose Rodriguez Cabello	SEBIN Director, cousin of Diosdado Cabello						
S	2024-11-27	Javier Jose Marcana Tabata	DCGIM Director, head of Presidential Honor Guard						
S	2024-11-27	Orlando Ramon Romero Bolivar	Bolivarian Militia commander						
G	2024-11-27	Anibal Eduardo Coronado Millan	Minister of Office of the President						
G	2024-11-27	William Alfredo Castillo Bolle	Minister of Anti-Blockade Policies						
G	2024-11-27	Ricardo Menendez	Vice President of Planning for Office of the President						
G	2024-11-27	Freddy Nanez	Minister for Communication and Information						
G	2024-11-27	Daniella Cabello	President of the Venezuelan Export Promotion Agency, daughter of Diosdado Cabello						
G	2024-11-27	Julio Jose Garcia Zerpa	Minister of Penitentiary Services						
G	2024-11-27	America Valentina Perez Davila	National Assembly						
G	2025-01-10	Conrado Ramón Pérez Briceño	CNE Rector (not to be confused with Conrado Pérez, National Assembly legislator)						
S	2025-01-10	Alexis José Rodríguez Cabello	SEBIN Director						
S	2025-01-10	Rubén Dario Santiago Servigna	Bolivarian National Police, Brigadier General						
G	2025-01-10	Héctor Andrés Obregón Pérez	PDVSA President						
G	2025-01-10	Ramon Celestino Velasquez Araguayan	Transportation Minister						
S	2025-01-10	Félix Ramón Osorio Guzmán	Interior Ministry, Vice minister of legal security, former FANB						
S	2025-01-10	Danny Ramon Ferrer Sandrea	CICPC						
S	2025-01-10	Jhonny Rafael Salazar Bello	CICPC						
S	2025-01-10	Manuel Enrique Castillo Rengifo	FANB						
S	2025-01-10	José Ramón Figuera Valdez	Capital District Defense Zone						
S	2025-03-20	Florencio Ramón Escalona	PNB						
S	2025-03-20	Leonel Alberto García Rivas	PNB						
G	2025-03-20	Ronny Fernando González Montesinos	DAET						
O	2025-06-24	Giovanni Vicente Mosquera Serrano	Tren de Aragua						
O	2025-07-17	Hector Guerrero Flores	Tren de Aragua						
O	2025-07-17	Yohan Jose Romero	Tren de Aragua						
O	2025-07-17	Josue Angel Santana Pena	Tren de Aragua						
O	2025-07-17	Wilmer Jose Perez Castillo	Tren de Aragua						
O	2025-07-17	Wendy Marbelys Rios Gomez	Tren de Aragua						
O	2025-07-17	Felix Anner Castillo Rondon	Tren de Aragua						
O	2025-12-03	Jimena Romina Araya Navarro (a.k.a. "Rosita")	Tren de Aragua affiliation						
O	2025-12-03	Eryk Manuel Landaeta Hernandez	Tren de Aragua affiliation						
O	2025-12-03	Kenffersso Jhosue Sevilla Arteaga	Tren de Aragua affiliation						
O	2025-12-03	Richard Jose Espinal Quintero	Tren de Aragua affiliation						
O	2025-12-03	Noe Manases Aponte Cordova	Tren de Aragua affiliation						
O	2025-12-03	Asdrubal Rafael Escobar Cabrera	Tren de Aragua affiliation						
O	2025-12-03	Cheison Royer Guerrero Palma	Tren de Aragua affiliation						
O	2025-12-11	Ramon Carretero Napolitano	Panamanian businessman linked to Maduro-Flores family oil ventures						
O	2025-12-11	Efraín Antonio Campo Flores	Nephew of Maduro's wife, Cilia Flores, convincted in U.S. on drug charges						
O	2025-12-11	Franqui Francisco Flores de Freitas	Nephew of Maduro's wife, Cilia Flores, convincted in U.S. on drug charges						
O	2025-12-19	Eloisa Flores de Malpica	Sister of Cilia Flores, mother of Carlos Erik Malpica Flores						
O	2025-12-19	Carlos Evelio Malpica Torrealba	Father of Carlos Erik Malpica Flores						
O	2025-12-19	Iriamni Malpica Flores	Sister of Carlos Erik Malpica Flores						
O	2025-12-19	Damaris del Carmen Hurtado Perez	Wife of Carlos Erik Malpica Flores						
O	2025-12-19	Erica Patricia Malpica Hurtado	Daughter of Carlos Erik Malpica Flores						
O	2025-12-19	Roberto Carretero Napolitano	Immediate family of Ramon Carretero Napolitano						
O	2025-12-19	Vicente Luis Carretero Napolitano	Immediate family of Ramon Carretero Napolitano						
O	2025-12-30	Jose Jesus Urdaneta Gonzal	Chairperson of Empresa Aeronautica Nacional SA						

== Entities sanctioned ==
Legend: A – Aircraft; C – Company; G – Governmental organization/state institution; S – Ship; Entity no longer sanctioned

Company, vessel or entity		Sanction date	Source	Sanctioned by	Based in	Notes
C	Elemento Ltd	2021-01-19	X mark	U.S.	Malta	Brokered the sale of Venezuelan crude oil
C	Swissoil Trading SA	2021-01-19	X mark	U.S.	Geneva, Switzerland	Participated in sale and shipping of Venezuelan crude oil
C	Elemento Oil and Gas Ltd; Elemento Solutions Limited; Element Capital Advisors Ltd; AMG S.A.S. di Alessandro Bazzoni & C.; Serigraphiclab di Bazzoni Alessandro; Jambanyani Safaris; D'Agostino & Company, Ltd; Catalina Holdings Corp.; 82 Elm Realty LLC	2021-01-19	X mark	U.S.	Malta; U.K.; Panama; Italy; Italy; Zimbabwe; Venezuela; New York; New York	Companies owned or controlled by Bazzoni, D'Agostino, or Elemento
S	Baliar crude oil tanker (IMO:9192258); Balita crude oil tanker (IMO:9176773); Domani shuttle tanker (IMO:9041057); Freedom crude oil tanker (IMO:9018464).	2021-01-19		U.S.	Liberia; Cameroon; Cameroon; Cameroon	Owned by Fides Ship Management LLC
S	Maksim Gorky	2021-01-19		U.S.	Russia	Crude oil tanker (IMO:9590008); owned by Instituto Nacional de los Espacios Acuaticos e Insulares, Venezuela
S	Sierra	2021-01-19		U.S.	Russia	Crude oil tanker (IMO:9147447); owned by Rustanker LLC, Russia
C	Ex-Cle Soluciones Biometricas CA	2020-12-18		U.S.	Venezuela, Argentine subsidiary	Provided "goods and services that the Maduro regime used to carry out the fraudulent December 6, 2020 parliamentary elections"
C	Libre Abordo	2020-06-18		U.S.	Mexico	Company engaged in resale of Venezuela crude oil
C	Schlager Business Group	2020-06-18		U.S.	Mexico	Company engaged in resale of Venezuela crude oil
C	Alel Technologies LLC, Cosmo Resources Pte. Ltd, Luzy Technologies LLC and Washington Trading Ltd.	2020-06-18		U.S.	Delaware, Singapore, Delaware, U.K.	Companies owned or controlled by Leal or Zepeda
S	Delos Voyager	2020-06-18		U.S.	Panama flag	Crude oil tanker (IMO:9273052); owned by Delos Voyager Shipping Ltd
S	Euroforce	2020-06-18		U.S.	Liberia flag	Crude oil tanker (IMO:9251585); owned by Romina Maritime Co Inc
C	TNK Trading International S.A.	2020-03-12		U.S.	Switzerland	Facilitating oil shipments of Venezuelan crude for Rosneft
C	Rosneft Trading S.A.	2020-02-18		U.S.	Russia; Switzerland	"Responsible for operating in the oil sector of the Venezuelan economy and brokered the sale and transport of Venezuelan crude oil."
A	PDVSA aircraft (15)	2020-01-21		U.S.	Venezuela	
C	Consorcio Venezolano de Industrias Aeronáuticas y Servicios Aéreos, S.A. (Conviasa)	2020-02-07		U.S.	Venezuela	
A	Conviasa aircraft (40)	2020-02-07		U.S.	Venezuela	
C	Corporacion Panamericana S.A.	2019-11-26		U.S.	Cuba	Facilitating oil shipments from Venezuela to Cuba
C	Caroil Transport Marine Ltd.	2019-09-24		U.S.	Cypres	Facilitating oil shipments from Venezuela to Cuba
C	Trocana World Inc.	2019-09-24		U.S.	Panama	Facilitating oil shipments from Venezuela to Cuba
C	Tovase Development Corp	2019-09-24		U.S.	Panama	Facilitating oil shipments from Venezuela to Cuba
C	Bluelane Overseas SA	2019-09-24		U.S.	Panama	Facilitating oil shipments from Venezuela to Cuba
S	Carlota C	2019-09-24		U.S.	Cypress	Chemical/products tanker (IMO:9502453); operated by Caroil Transport Marine Ltd.
S	Sandino	2019-09-24		U.S.	Panama	Chemical/products tanker (IMO:9441178); owned by Tovase Development Corp
S	Petion	2019-09-24		U.S.	Panama	Products tanker (IMO:9295098); owned by Trocana World Inc.
S	Giralt	2019-09-24		U.S.	Panama	Crude oil tanker (IMO:9259692); owned by Bluelane Overseas SA
C	Fundacion Venedig	2019-09-17		U.S.	Panama	
C	Inversiones Rodime S.A.	2019-09-17		U.S.	Panama	
C	Saafartex Zona Franca SAS	2019-09-17		U.S.	Colombia	
C	Venedig Capital S.A.S.	2019-09-17		U.S.	Colombia	
C	AGRO XPO S.A.S.	2019-09-17		U.S.	Colombia	
C	Alamo Trading S.A.	2019-09-17		U.S.	Colombia	
C	Antiqua Del Caribe S.A.S.	2019-09-17		U.S.	Colombia	
C	Avanti Global Group S.A.S.	2019-09-17		U.S.	Colombia	
C	Global Energy Company S.A.S.	2019-09-17		U.S.	Colombia	
C	Gruppo Domano S.R.L.	2019-09-17		U.S.	Italy	
C	Manara S.A.S.	2019-09-17		U.S.	Colombia	
C	Techno Energy, S.A.	2019-09-17		U.S.	Panama	
C	Corporacion ACS Trading S.A.S.	2019-09-17		U.S.	Colombia	
C	Dimaco Technology, S.A.	2019-09-17		U.S.	Panama	
C	Global De Textiles Andino S.A.S.	2019-09-17		U.S.	Colombia	
C	Saab Certain & Compania S. En C.	2019-09-17		U.S.	Colombia	
C	Silver Bay Partners FZE (Silver)	2019-07-25		U.S.	United Arab Emirates	"Responsible for or complicit in, or directly or indirectly involved in, a transaction or series of transactions involving deceptive practices or corruption and the Government of Venezuela or projects or programs administered by the Government of Venezuela."
C	Clio Management Corp.	2019-07-25		U.S.	Panama	Owned and controlled by Emmanuel Enrique Rubio Gonzalez
C	Sun Properties LLC	2019-07-25		U.S.	Delaware	Owned and controlled by Emmanuel Enrique Rubio Gonzalez
C	Multitex International Trading, S.A.	2019-07-25		U.S.	Panama	Owned and controlled by Emmanuel Enrique Rubio Gonzalez
C	Global Structure S.A.	2019-07-25		U.S.	Panama	Owned and controlled by Emmanuel Enrique Rubio Gonzalez
C	Emmr & CIA S.A.S.	2019-07-25		U.S.	Colombia	Owned and controlled by Emmanuel Enrique Rubio Gonzalez
C	C I Fondo Global De Alimentos LTDA	2019-07-25		U.S.	Colombia	Owned and controlled by Emmanuel Enrique Rubio Gonzalez
C	Seafire Foundation	2019-07-25		U.S.	Panama	"Saab and his direct family members were the beneficiaries of the entity that facilitated payments to Saab as a part of the CLAP corruption scheme."
C	Mulberry Proje Yatirim Anonym Sirketi (Mulberry A.S.)	2019-07-25		U.S.	Turkey	"Responsible for or complicit in, or directly or indirectly involved in, a transaction or series of transactions involving deceptive practices or corruption and the Government of Venezuela or projects or programs administered by the Government of Venezuela. Mulberry was used to facilitate payments made as a part of Saab's CLAP corruption network for the sale of gold in Turkey."
C	Group Grand Limited General Trading	2019-07-25		U.S.	United Arab Emirates	"It is a part of the global network of front and shell companies used by Saab and Pulido to facilitate the CLAP corruption scheme."
C	Group Grand Limited, S.A. de C.V.	2019-07-25		U.S.	Mexico	"It is part of the network of shell and front companies used by Pulido and Saab to facilitate the CLAP corruption scheme."
C	Group Grand Limited	2019-07-25		U.S.	Hong Kong (China)	"The company served as a primary entity in the global network of shell and front companies used by both Saab and Pulido to facilitate the CLAP corruption scheme."
C	Asasi Food FZE	2019-07-25		U.S.	United Arab Emirates	"This company received money from food companies in Venezuela that were receiving food imports and paying money to food providers in Mexico as a means to facilitate the CLAP corruption scheme."
C	19 Mexican food companies	2019-07-18		Mexico	Mexico	Mexico's Financial Intelligence Unit accuses the 19 companies of money laundering after detecting "irregularities for 150 million USD." The companies were under investigation since 2016 for selling expensive low quality food products to CLAP, a food distribution program established by the Venezuelan government.
G	Dirección General de Contrainteligencia Militar	2019-07-11		U.S.	Venezuela	Agency implicated in the death of Rafael Acosta Arévalo on 29 June 2019
C	Cubametales	2019-07-03		U.S.	Cuba	Facilitating oil shipments from Venezuela to Cuba
C	Monsoon Navigation Corporation	2019-05-10		U.S.	Marshall Islands	Registered owner of the tanker, Ocean Elegance
C	Serenity Maritime Limited	2019-05-10	X mark	U.S.	Liberia	Registered owner of the tanker, Leon Dias
S	Ocean Elegance	2019-05-10		U.S.	Panama flag	Crude oil tanker (IMO: 9038749), owned by Monsoon Navigation Corporation
S	Leon Dias	2019-05-10	X mark	U.S.	Panama flag	Chemical and oil tanker (IMO: 9396385), owned by Serenity Maritime Limited
G	Central Bank of Venezuela	2019-04-17		U.S.	Venezuela	"While this designation will inhibit most Central Bank activities undertaken by the illegitimate Maduro regime, the United States has taken steps to ensure that regular debit and credit card transactions can proceed and personal remittances and humanitarian assistance continue unabated and are able to reach those suffering under the Maduro regime's repression."
C	Jennifer Navigation Limited	2019-04-12		U.S.	Liberia	
C	Large Range Limited	2019-04-12		U.S.	Liberia	
C	Lima Shipping Corporation	2019-04-12	X mark	U.S.	Liberia	
C	PB Tankers S.P.A.	2019-04-12	X mark	U.S.	Italy	
S	Alba Marina	2019-04-12	X mark	U.S.	Italy	Floating Storage Tanker, IMO 9151838, PB Tankers
S	Gold Point	2019-04-12	X mark	U.S.	Malta	Chemical/Oil Tanker, IMO 9506693, PB Tankers
S	Ice Point	2019-04-12	X mark	U.S.	Malta	Chemical/Oil Tanker, IMO 9379337, PB Tankers
S	Indian Point	2019-04-12	X mark	U.S.	Malta	Chemical/Oil Tanker, IMO 9379325, PB Tankers
S	Iron Point	2019-04-12	X mark	U.S.	Malta	Chemical/Oil Tanker, IMO 9388209, PB Tankers
S	Nedas renamed Esperanza	2019-04-12		U.S.	Greek	Crude Oil Tanker, IMO 9289166, Jennifer Navigation
S	New Hellas	2019-04-12	X mark	U.S.	Greek	Crude Oil Tanker, IMO 9221891, Lima Shipping
S	Silver Point	2019-04-12		U.S.	Malta	Chemical/Oil Tanker, IMO 9510462, PB Tankers
S	S-Trotter	2019-04-12		U.S.	Panama	Oil Products Tanker, IMO 9216547, Large Range
S	Despina Andrianna	2019-04-05		U.S.	Liberia	Crude oil tanker (IMO: 9182667)
C	Ballito Bay Shipping Incorporated	2019-04-05		U.S.	Liberia	Registered owner of the vessel, Despina Andrianna
C	ProPer In Management Incorporated	2019-04-05		U.S.	Greece	Operator of the vessel, Despina Andrianna
S	PDVSA Vessels (34)	2019-04-05		U.S.		Blocked vessels in which PDVSA has an interest: Amapola 1, Amuay, Bicentenario I, Bicentenario Ii, Bicentenario Iii, Bicentenario Iv, Bicentenario V, Bicentenario Vi, Bicentenario Vii, Bicentenario Viii, Bicentenario Ix, Bicentenario X, Bicentenario Xi, Bicentenario Xii, Bicentenario Xiii, Bicentenario Xiv, Bicentenario Xv, Bicentenario Xvi, Caribe, Cayaurima, Cumanagoto, Gardenia, Gp-21, Gp-23, Jazmin, L-409, Manaure, Mara, Margarita 1, PDVSA Cardon, Sabaneta, Tribilin, Urdaneta, Yoraco
C	BANDES	2019-03-22		U.S.	Venezuela	Simon Zerpa, CEO and President of the Board
C	Banco Bandes Uruguay S.A.	2019-03-22		U.S.	Uruguay	
C	Banco Bicentenario del Pueblo, de la Clase Obrera, Mujer y Comunias, Banco Universal C.A.	2019-03-22		U.S.	Venezuela	
C	Banco de Venezuela, S.A. Banco Universal	2019-03-22		U.S.	Venezuela	
C	Banco Prodem S.A.	2019-03-22		U.S.	Bolivia	
C	Minerven	2019-03-19		U.S.	Venezuela	a.k.a. Compania General de Mineria de Venezuela; Corporacion Venezolana de Guayana Minverven C.A.; CVG Compania General de Mineria de Venezuela CA; CVG Minerven; Via principal Carapal, El Callao, Bolivar, Venezuela; Zona Industrial Caratal, El Callao, Bolivar, Venezuela; National ID No. J006985970 (Venezuela) [VENEZUELA-EO13850]. President, Adrian Antonio Perdomo
C	Evrofinance Mosnarbank	2019-03-11		U.S.	Russia	Bank jointly owned by Russian and Venezuelan state companies.
C	Petroleos de Venezuela, S.A. (PdVSA)	2019-01-28		U.S.	Venezuela	
C	Constello No. 1 Corporation	2019-01-08		U.S.	Delaware	Owned or controlled by Gustavo Perdomo
C	Constello Inc.	2019-01-08		U.S.	St. Kitts and Nevis	Owned or controlled by Gustavo Perdomo
C	Corpomedios GV Inversiones, C.A.	2019-01-08		U.S.	Venezuela	Owned or controlled by Raúl Gorrín and Gustavo Perdomo
C	Corpomedios LLC	2019-01-08		U.S.	Florida	Owned or controlled by Raúl Gorrín and Gustavo Perdomo
C	Globovision Tele C.A.	2019-01-08		U.S.	Venezuela	Owned or controlled by Raúl Gorrín and Gustavo Perdomo
C	Globovision Tele CA, Corp.	2019-01-08		U.S.	Florida	Owned or controlled by Raúl Gorrín and Gustavo Perdomo
C	Magus Holdings USA, Corp.	2019-01-08		U.S.	Florida	Owned or controlled by Gustavo Perdomo
C	Magus Holding LLC	2019-01-08		U.S.	Florida	Owned or controlled by Gustavo Perdomo
C	Magus Holding II LLC	2019-01-08		U.S.	Florida	Owned or controlled by Gustavo Perdomo
C	Planet 2 Reaching Inc.	2019-01-08		U.S.	Delaware	Owned or controlled by Raúl Gorrín
C	Potrico Corp.	2019-01-08		U.S.	Delaware	Owned or controlled by Gustavo Perdomo
C	Posh 8 Dynamic Inc.	2019-01-08		U.S.	Delaware	Owned or controlled by Raúl Gorrín
C	RIM Group Investments, Corp.	2019-01-08		U.S.	Florida	Owned or controlled by Raúl Gorrín
C	RIM Group Investments I Corp.	2019-01-08		U.S.	Florida	Owned or controlled by Raúl Gorrín
C	RIM Group Investments II Corp.	2019-01-08		U.S.	Florida	Owned or controlled by Raúl Gorrín
C	RIM Group Investments III Corp.	2019-01-08		U.S.	Florida	Owned or controlled by Raúl Gorrín
C	RIM Group Properties of New York, Corp.	2019-01-08		U.S.	New York	Owned or controlled by Raúl Gorrín
C	RIM Group Properties of New York II Corp.	2019-01-08		U.S.	New York	Owned or controlled by Raúl Gorrín
C	Seguros La Vitalicia	2019-01-08		U.S.	Venezuela	Owned or controlled by Raúl Gorrín
C	Tindaya Properties Holding USA Corp.	2019-01-08		U.S.	New York	Owned or controlled by Gustavo Perdomo
C	Tindaya Properties of New York, Corp.	2019-01-08		U.S.	New York	Owned or controlled by Gustavo Perdomo
C	Tindaya Properties of New York II Corp.	2019-01-08		U.S.	New York	Owned or controlled by Gustavo Perdomo
C	Windham Commercial Group Inc.	2019-01-08		U.S.	Delaware	Owned or controlled by Raúl Gorrín and Gustavo Perdomo
A	N133JA tail number	2019-01-08	X mark	U.S.	U.S.	Dassault Mystere Falcon 50EX private aircraft, beneficially owned by Gustavo Perdomo
A	N488RC tail number	2018-09-25		U.S.	Florida	Gulfstream 200 private jet
C	Agencia Vehiculos Especiales Rurales y Urbanos, C.A. (AVERUCA, C.A.)	2018-09-25		U.S.	Florida	Venezuelan company that operates the aircraft N488RC; President Rafael Sarria
C	Panazeate SL	2018-09-25		U.S.	Spain	Owned or controlled by Edgar Sarria
C	Quiana Trading Limited (Quiana Trading)	2018-09-25		U.S.	British Virgin Islands	Rafael Sarria, 2009 President; beneficial owner of aircraft N488RC
C	SAI Advisors Inc.	2018-05-18		U.S.	Florida	Owned or controlled by Rafael Sarria
C	Noor Plantation Investments LLC	2018-05-18		U.S.	Florida	Owned or controlled by Rafael Sarria
C	11420 Corp.	2018-05-18		U.S.	Florida	Owned or controlled by Rafael Sarria
C	American Quality Professional S.A.	2018-03-27		Panama	Panama	
C	International Business Suppliers, Inc.	2018-03-27		Panama	Panama	
C	Inversiones Cemt, S.A.	2018-03-27		Panama	Panama	
C	Lumar Development S.A.	2018-03-27		Panama	Panama	
C	Marine Investment Group Inc.	2018-03-27		Panama	Panama	
C	Marine Investor Corp.	2018-03-27		Panama	Panama	
C	Maritime Administration Group Inc.	2018-03-27		Panama	Panama	
C	Maritime Administration Panama Inc.	2018-03-27		Panama	Panama	
C	Maritime Crews Inc.	2018-03-27		Panama	Panama	
C	Maritime Tanker Administration, S.A.	2018-03-27		Panama	Panama	
C	Maritime Tanker Services, S.A.	2018-03-27		Panama	Panama	
C	Oceanus Investors Corp.	2018-03-27		Panama	Panama	
C	Proalco S.A.	2018-03-27		Panama	Panama	
C	Seaside Services Inc.	2018-03-27		Panama	Panama	
C	Tanker Administrators Corp.	2018-03-27		Panama	Panama	
C	Technical Support Trading	2018-03-27		Panama	Panama	
C	Maiquetia VIP Bar Restaurant; Eryk Producciones SAS	2025-12-03		U.S.	Colombia	Owned by Eryk Manuel Landaeta Hernandez
C	Global Import Solutions S.A.	2025-12-03		U.S.	Venezuela	Jimena Romina Araya Navarro, President
C	Yakera y Lane SAS	2025-12-03		U.S.	Colombia	Owned by Kenffersso Jhosue Sevilla Arteaga, a.k.a. Jose Daniel Martinez Lopez
C	1. Poweroy Investment Limited); 2. Arctic Voyager Incorporated; 3. Ready Great Limited; 4. Full Happy Limited; 5. Sino Marine Services Limited; 6. Myra Marine Limited	2025-12-11		U.S.	1. BVI; 2. Marshall Islands; 3. MI; 4. MI; 5. UK; 6. MI	1. Owner of H. Constance; 2. Owner of Kiara M 3. Owner of Lattafa; 4. Owner of Monique; 5. Manager and operator of Tamia; 6. Owner of White Crane
S	1. H. Constance; 2. Kiara M 3. Lattafa; 4. Monique; 5. Tamia; 6. White Crane	2025-12-11		U.S.	1. Panama; 2. Panama; 3. Panama; 4. Cook Islands; 5. Hong Kong; 6. Panama	1. Crude oil tanker (IMO: 9237773); 2. Crude oil tanker (IMO: 9285823); 3. Crude oil tanker (IMO: 9245794); 4. Crude oil tanker (IMO: 9311270); 5. Crude oil tanker (IMO: 9315642); 6. Crude oil tanker (IMO:9323429)
C	Empresa Aeronautica Nacional SA	2025-12-30		U.S.	Venezuela	Chairperson Jose Jesus Urdaneta Gonzalez, drone trade with Iran
S	1. Della; 2. Valiant; 3. Rosalind; 4. Nord Star	2025-12-31		U.S.	1. Hong Kong; 2. Hong Kong; 3. Guinea; 4. Panama	1. Crude oil tanker (IMO: 9227479); 2. Crude oil tanker (IMO: 9409247); 3. Oil products tanker (IMO: 9277735) aka Lunar TID; 4. Crude oil tanker (IMO: 9323596)
C	1. Aries Global Investment LTD; 2. Winky International Limited; 3. Corniola Limited; 4. Krape Myrtle Co LTD	2025-12-31		U.S.	1. China; 2. China; 3. China; 4. China	1. Owner of Della, interest in Valiant; 2. Owner of Rosalind; 3. Owner of Nord Star; 4. Operator of Nord Star

== See also ==
- Cartel of the Suns
- International sanctions during the Russo-Ukrainian War
- International sanctions during the 2022 Russian invasion of Ukraine
- International sanctions against Iran
- International sanctions during apartheid
- United States embargoes
