= Venezuela Defense of Human Rights and Civil Society Act of 2014 =

Act of the United States Congress

- Long title: A bill to impose targeted sanctions on persons responsible for violations of human rights of antigovernment protesters in Venezuela, to strengthen civil society in Venezuela, and for other purposes.
- Announced in: the 113th United States Congress
- Sponsored by: Senator Bob Menendez (D–NJ)
- Number of co-sponsors: 4

Legislative history
- Introduced in the Senate as S. 2142 by Bob Menendez (D–NJ) on March 13, 2014; Committee consideration by Senate Foreign Relations; Passed the Senate on December 7, 2014 (voice vote); Passed the House on December 10, 2014 (voice vote); Signed into law by President Barack Obama on December 18, 2014

The Venezuela Defense of Human Rights and Civil Society Act of 2014 (S. 2142) is a United States law used to impose targeted sanctions on certain individuals in Venezuela that were responsible for violations of human rights of antigovernment protesters during the 2014 Venezuelan protests. The law is also used to strengthen civil society in Venezuela, and for other purposes.

The ACT was extended in 2016 to expire on 31 December 2019.

== Procedural history ==
The bill was introduced by Senator Robert Menendez on March 13, 2014. It was then passed by the Senate on December 7, 2014, and passed the House on December 10, 2014, to be signed into law by President Barack Obama. On December 18, 2014, President Obama signed the bill into law.

== Actions ==
On February 2, 2015, the United States Department of State imposed visa restrictions on current and former Venezuelan officials that were allegedly linked to presumed human rights abuses and political corruption. The visa restrictions also included family members of those involved in the allegations, with the Department of State saying, "We are sending a clear message that human rights abusers, those who profit from public corruption, and their families are not welcome in the United States".

=== March 2015 ===
On 9 March 2015, Obama ordered the United States Department of the Treasury to freeze property and assets of the following individuals:

- Benavides Torres, Antonio José: commander in the Venezuelan armed forces and former leader of the Venezuelan National Guard
- Bernal Martínez, Manuel Gregoria: former Director General of SEBIN
- González López, Gustavo Enrique: Director General of SEBIN
- Haringhton Padron, Katherine Nayarith: national-level prosecutor in Venezuela
- Noguera Pietri, Justo José: former General Commander of Venezuela's National Guard
- Pérez Urdaneta, Manuel Eduardo: Director of the Bolivarian National Police
- Vivas Landino, Miguel Alcides: Inspector General of the Venezuelan armed forces

== See also ==
- List of bills in the 113th United States Congress
- Corruption in Venezuela
- Human rights in Venezuela
- International sanctions during the Venezuelan crisis
