= Pedroza =

Pedroza is a surname. Notable people with the surname include:

- Anthony Pedroza (born 1979), Mexican-American basketball player
- Antonio Pedroza (born 1991), English-Mexican footballer
- César Octavio Pedroza Gaitán (born 1959), Mexican politician
- Engels Pedroza (born 1966), Venezuelan boxer
- Enrique Ibarra Pedroza (born 1952), Mexican politician
- Erik Pedroza (born 1994), Mexican footballer
- Eusebio Pedroza (1956–2019), Panamanian boxer
- Héctor Pedroza Jiménez (born 1964), Mexican politician
- Martin A. Pedroza (born 1965), Panamanian jockey
- Paola Pedroza, Mexican television presenter
- Rafael Pedroza (born 1955), Panamanian boxer
- Reinaldo Muñoz Pedroza (born 1971), Venezuelan politician
- Sebastián Pedroza (born 1999), Colombian footballer
