= General Rivera =

General Rivera may refer to:

- Fructuoso Rivera (1784–1854), Uruguayan general
- Isabelo Rivera (born 1956), U.S. Army National Guard brigadier general
- Pedro N. Rivera (born 1946), U.S. Air Force brigadier general

== See also ==
- Sergio José Rivero (born 1964), Venezuelan National Guard general
