= Iliana Ruzza =

Venezuelan public official

Vice President of Finance of Petróleos de Venezuela

Personal details
- Occupation: Public official

Iliana Josefa Ruzza Terán is a Venezuelan public official who has held different financial positions during the administrations of Hugo Chávez and later of Nicolás Maduro, including director of the board of directors of the Central Bank of Venezuela.

== Career ==
According to a review of the Poderopedia portal, since 2009 Ruzza has appeared in different financial positions in several Official Gazettes during the administrations of Hugo Chávez and later of Nicolás Maduro. In May 2018, she was appointed vice president of finance of Petróleos de Venezuela, and in July as director of the board of directors of Corporación Venezolana de Comercio Exterior (CORPOVEX). In the Official Gazette number 41.434, on 6 July 2018, she was appointed as director of the board of directors of the Central Bank of Venezuela.

== Sanctions ==
On 17 April 2019, the United States Treasury Department sanctioned and issued Office of Foreign Assets Control designations against the Central Bank of Venezuela and Iliana Ruzza to prevent it from being used "as a tool of the Maduro regime, which continues to plunder Venezuelan assets and exploit government institutions to enrich" corrupt officials. Treasury Secretary Steven Mnuchin stated that while the designation disqualifies most of the Central Bank actions taken by the Maduro administration, the United States has taken steps to ensure that debit and credit card transactions could proceed, and that both personal remittances and humanitarian assistance remained intact and could help those suffering "under the repression of the Maduro regime".

== See also ==
- International sanctions during the Venezuelan crisis
