= Jesús Suárez Chourio =

Venezuelan military officer

Jesús Rafael Suárez Chourio (born 19 July 1962) is a Venezuelan military officer who served as the General Commander of the Bolivarian Army of Venezuela from 20 June 2017 until 8 July 2019.

== Biography ==
Chourio served as General of the Army Division, graduated in the "Francisco de Paula Alcántara" promotion of 1986 of the Military Academy of Venezuela. Commander of the 42 Parachute Brigade of Maracay, Aragua. He is also commander of the Comprehensive Defense Operations Zone (ZODI) for the State of Aragua. He participated in the coup d'état of 1992, led by Hugo Chávez and, after his death, was one of those who helped to load his coffin during the funeral.

Until 2011, he was leader of the Protection and Security Unit in charge of the protection of the President of the Republic and head of the private guard of Chávez. He was one of the military of his greatest confidence. In an official ceremony on 5 March 2014, the anniversary of the death of Hugo Chávez, the first words he spoke were "Chávez vive!" (English: "Long Live Chávez") to which President Nicolás Maduro responded "The struggle continues" (Spanish: "La lucha sigue").

In July 2016, President Nicolás Maduro appointed Chourio to command the Comprehensive Defense Region of the Central Zone (REDI Central), which comprises the States of Aragua, Carabobo and Yaracuy states, and promoted to major general.

On 8 July 2019, President Nicolás Maduro dismissed Chourio as general commander of the Venezuelan Army and appointed Rodriguez Cabello as his successor, brother of PSUV vice president Diosdado Cabello.

== Sanctions ==
Chourio has been sanctioned by several countries and is banned from entering neighboring Colombia. The Colombian government maintains a list of people banned from entering Colombia or subject to expulsion; as of January 2019, the list had 200 people with a "close relationship and support for the Nicolás Maduro regime".

=== United States ===
In July 2017, thirteen senior officials of the Venezuelan government, including Chourio, associated with the 2017 Venezuelan Constituent Assembly elections were sanctioned by the United States for their role in undermining democracy and human rights.

=== Canada ===
On 22 September 2017, Canada sanctioned Chourio due to rupture of Venezuela's constitutional order.

=== Panama ===
On 29 March 2018, Chourio was sanctioned by the Panamanian government for his alleged involvement with "money laundering, financing of terrorism and financing the proliferation of weapons of mass destruction".

=== European Union ===
The European Union sanctioned seven Venezuela officials, including Chourio, on 18 January 2018, singling them out as being responsible for deteriorating democracy in the country. The sanctioned individuals were prohibited from entering the nations of the European Union, and their assets were frozen.

=== Switzerland ===
Switzerland sanctioned Chourio on 10 July 2018, freezing his assets and imposing a travel ban while citing the same reasons of the European Union.
