= Carmen Zuleta =

Venezuelan judge (born 1947)

- Born: 13 December 1947 (age 78)
- Education: University of Zulia
- Occupation: Judge

Carmen Auxiliadora Zuleta de Merchán (13 December 1947) is a Venezuelan judge. She is currently a judge of the Constitutional Chamber of the Supreme Tribunal of Justice of Venezuela.

== Career ==
Zuleta graduated as a medic from the University of Zulia and has studied at the University of Bologna, Italy, as well as the University of La Sorbonne, France. She has held nine academic positions at the University of Zulia and has worked at both the Ministry of Labor and the Supreme Tribunal of Justice since 1999.

Carmen has been a judge of the Constitutional Chamber of the Supreme Tribunal of Justice since 2005. She was ratified in her position for a 12-year term by the National Assembly with a pro-government majority.

In July 2014, criminal lawyer Morly Uzcátegui, from Maracaibo, denounced Zuleta for using influence to her benefit when she claimed ownership of a plot of land in the Isla Dorada urbanization in the city. According to Uzcátegui, his client, identified as Sonsiles Medina Chávez, built a house on the land, which for more than twenty years had been abandoned, and Carmen subsequently claimed ownership of it.

On 1 November 2016, she was part of the Venezuelan delegation in Geneva, Switzerland, to the Universal Periodic Review conducted by the United Nations Human Rights Council, whose objective is the evaluation of human rights commitments.

== Sanctions ==
On 30 March 2018, it was sanctioned by the government of Panama as it was considered "high risk for money laundering, terrorist financing and financing the proliferation of weapons of mass destruction.".

== See also ==
- International sanctions during the Venezuelan crisis
