= Carol Padilla =

Venezuelan judge (born 1972)

- Born: 19 February 1972 (age 54)
- Occupation: Judge

Carol Bealexis Padilla Reyes de Arretureta (born 19 February 1972) is a Venezuelan judge currently serving at the First Special Court of First Instance in Control Functions and a substitute judge of the Court of Appeals of the criminal judicial circuit of Caracas. She is known for issuing arrest warrants against National Assembly deputies Julio Borges and Juan Requesens in 2018, and being involved in the March 2019 arrest of Roberto Marrero, Guaido's chief of staff.

According to National Assembly deputy Julio Borges, Padilla is the right-hand man of the president of the National Constituent Assembly, Diosdado Cabello.

== Career ==
Padilla currently serves as judge in control of Caracas and has worked in the executive direction of the judiciary since 1990. In 2002, she represented one of the "victims" of the Llaguno Bridge Events when filing a lawsuit that determined whether there were merits in prosecuting to Franklin Arrieche, Blanca Rosa Marble of León and Hadel Mostafá Paolini, magistrates of the Supreme Court of Justice, under the charge of "political plot". On that occasion they suggested to the then president of the Supreme Court, Ivan Rincon, that he resign his post to guarantee continuity of the maximum court before the "coup d'état".

Judge Padilla was a judicial representative of Yonny Bolívar in 2005, whose trial was against him for kidnapping, concealing firearms, usurping a military title and obtaining a passport with false information. Yonny Bolívar is also responsible for the murder of journalist Adriana Urquiola during the 2014 protests.

=== During the crisis in Venezuela ===
Judge Padilla issued the arrest warrants against opposition politicians Julio Borges and Juan Requesens in August 2018, following the failed drone attack on President Maduro. In March 2019, she signed the arrest warrant against Roberto Marrero, chief of staff to interim president Juan Guaidó in March 2019.

Padilla was also involved in the case of councilman Fernando Albán and ordered the arrest of Luis Sánchez Rangel, assistant prosecutor Pedro Lupera; both were responsible for the investigation of the Odebrecht case in Venezuela. Along with prosecutors Farik Mora and Dinorah Bustamante, they have been identified in numerous cases characterized by dubious political procedure.

== Irregularities ==
Padilla was involved in the falsification of a public document that led to a criminal investigation and why she was detained preventively. Padilla admitted to being the author of the falsification of a communication that had to be emanated from the Social Security Institute of the Lawyer in which it was certified that Yohan Arretureta Guevara, accused of extortion, was a lawyer, fact that was false.

== Sanctions ==
The United States sanctioned Padilla along with Maduro's Foreign Minister Jorge Arreaza on 26 April 2019 as they were determined to be current or former officials of the Government of Venezuela. Both were accused of exploiting the U.S. financial system to support the “illegitimate” regime of Nicolas Maduro. The U.S. Department of State issued a statement describing Padilla as the judge involved in the March 2019 detention of Roberto Marrero, Guaidó's top aide.
