= Sergio José Rivero =

Venezuelan General

Sergio José Rivero Marcano (born 8 November 1964) is a Venezuelan general. As of 2017, he was the Commander General of the Venezuelan National Guard. He was formerly a commander of the National Bolivarian Armed Forces of Venezuela.

Nicolás Maduro appointed Rivero Commander of the National Guard on 24 June 2017, and replaced him with Richard Jesús López Vargas less than a year later; Rivero accused the media of portraying protestors like "the good ones". The change in command came after Óscar Alberto Pérez was killed by security forces in El Junquito raid, amid public criticism that Pérez and his supporters were killed after they had surrendered.

== International sanctions ==
Rivero has been sanctioned by several countries and is banned from entering neighboring Colombia. The Colombian government maintains a list of people banned from entering Colombia or subject to expulsion; as of January 2019, the list had 200 people with a "close relationship and support for the Nicolás Maduro regime".

In July 2017, the United States sanctioned thirteen senior officials of the Venezuelan government associated with the 2017 Venezuelan Constituent Assembly elections for their role in undermining democracy and human rights, including Rivero.

Canada sanctioned 40 Venezuelan officials, including Rivero, in September 2017. The sanctions were for behaviors that undermined democracy after at least 125 people will killed in the 2017 Venezuelan protests and "in response to the government of Venezuela's deepening descent into dictatorship". Canadians were banned from transactions with the 40 individuals, whose Canadian assets were frozen.

In March 2018, Panama sanctioned 55 public officials, including Rivero.

In June 2018, the European Union sanctioned eleven officials, including Rivero, in response to the May 2018 Venezuelan presidential election, which the E.U. described as "neither free nor fair", stating that "their outcome lacked any credibility as the electoral process did not ensure the necessary guarantees for them to be inclusive and democratic".

On 10 July 2018, Sergio José Rivero, among eleven Venezuelans previously sanctioned by the European Union in June 2018, was added to the sanctions list of Switzerland.
