= Antonio José Benavides =

Venezuelan Major General

Personal details
- Born: Antonio José Benavides Torres; 13 June 1961 (age 65) Venezuela

Military service
- Allegiance: Venezuela
- Branch/service: National Bolivarian Armed Forces of Venezuela
- Rank: Major General

Antonio José Benavides Torres (born 13 June 1961) is a Venezuelan Major General and former commander of the Venezuelan National Guard.

As of 2015, Benavides was head of the Central Integral Defense Strategic Region for the National Bolivarian Armed Forces of Venezuela.

Benavides was Head of Government of the Capital District.

Benavides took a one-year course from the United States Western Hemisphere Institute for Security Cooperation in Georgia in 2000.

== International sanctions ==
Benavides has been sanctioned by several countries.

=== United States ===
The U.S. sanctioned Benavides for his role in the 2014 Venezuelan protests. U.S. President Barack Obama issued a presidential order in 2015 declaring Venezuela a "threat to its national security" and ordered the United States Department of the Treasury to freeze property and assets of seven Venezuelan officials. The U.S. held the seven individuals, including Benavides, responsible for "excesses committed in the repression of the demonstrations of February 2014 that left at least 43 dead" including "erosion of human rights guarantees, persecution of political opponents, restrictions on press freedom, violence and human rights abuses in response to anti-government protests, arbitrary arrests and arrests of anti-government protesters, and significant public corruption" according to BBC Mundo.

=== Canada ===
Canada sanctioned 40 Venezuelan officials, including Benavides, in September 2017. The sanctions were for behaviors that undermined democracy after at least 125 people will killed in the 2017 Venezuelan protests and "in response to the government of Venezuela's deepening descent into dictatorship". Canadians were banned from transactions with the 40 individuals, whose Canadian assets were frozen.

=== European Union ===
The European Union sanctioned seven Venezuela officials, including Benavides, on 18 January 2018, singling them out as being responsible for deteriorating democracy in the country. The sanctioned individuals were prohibited from entering the nations of the European Union, and their assets were frozen.

=== Panama ===
In March 2018, Panama sanctioned 55 public officials, including Benavides, and Switzerland implemented sanctions, freezing the assets of seven ministers and high officials, including Benavides, due to human rights violations and deteriorating rule of law and democracy.

=== Mexico ===
On 20 April 2018, the Mexican Senate froze the assets of officials of the Maduro administration, including Benavides, and prohibited them from entering Mexico.
