= Katherine Haringhton =

Venezuelan prosecutor

Katherine Nayartih Haringhton Padrón (5 December 1971) is a Venezuelan lawyer who was the deputy attorney general between 2017 and 2018. She is known for taking important political legal cases and for being the only civilian among seven officials sanctioned during the Barack Obama administration by the Executive Order 13692 in March 2015 because of human rights violations between February and March 2014.

== Sanctions ==
On 27 March 2018, Panama sanctioned 55 public officials, including Haringhton.

On 25 June 2018, the European Union sanctioned 11 officials, including Haringhton, in response to the May 2018 Venezuelan presidential election.

On 10 July 2018, Haringhton, among 11 Venezuelans previously sanctioned by the European Union in June 2018, was added to the sanctions list of Switzerland.

Haringhton was sanctioned by the Canadian government on 15 April 2019 under the Special Economic Measures Act. The government statement said that "the sanctions hit high ranking officials of the Maduro regime, regional governors, and people directly implicated in activities undermining democratic institutions".
