= Reinaldo Muñoz Pedroza =

Venezuelan politician

Reinaldo Enrique Muñoz Pedroza (born 28 November 1971, Caracas) is a Venezuelan politician. He is the Attorney general of Venezuela and was appointed by President Nicolas Maduro.

== Sanctions ==
In September 2020, Pedroza was sanctioned by the United States Department of Treasury. The U.S. accused Pedroza and three other Venezuelan nationals of undermining democracy and election interference in Venezuela.
