= United States sanctions during the Venezuelan crisis =

During the crisis in Venezuela, the United States applied sanctions against specific Venezuelan government entities and individuals associated with the administration of Nicolás Maduro, along with sanctions applied by the European Union, Canada, Mexico, Panama and Switzerland. As of 3 March 2025, the Atlantic Council's sanctions tracker listed 209 individuals with links to Venezuela sanctioned by the U.S.

Early sanctions came in response to repression during the 2014 and the 2017 Venezuelan protests, and activities both during the 2017 Constituent Assembly election and the 2018 presidential election. Sanctions were placed on current and former government officials, including members of the Supreme Tribunal of Justice (TSJ) and the 2017 Constituent National Assembly (ANC), members of the military and security forces, and private individuals accused of being involved in human rights abuses, degradation in the rule of law, repression of democracy, and corruption. In March 2015, the U.S. administration under Barack Obama imposed asset and visa sanctions against 110 Venezuelan individuals, and eight entities. In August 2017, the administration of Donald Trump imposed sanctions which prohibited Venezuela's access to U.S. financial markets, and in May 2018, expanded them to block purchase of Venezuelan debt.

Beginning in January 2019, during the Venezuelan presidential crisis, the U.S. applied additional economic sanctions to individuals or companies in the petroleum, gold, mining, and banking industries and a food subsidy program. Companies in the petroleum sector evaded the sanctions on Venezuela's state-owned oil company, PDVSA, to continue oil shipments. In October 2023, the administration of Joe Biden temporarily lifted some U.S. sanctions on the oil, gas and gold industries in exchange for the promise of the release of political prisoners and free 2024 elections. Most of the sanctions were reimposed in April when the U.S. State Department said the Barbados Agreement to hold free elections had not been fully honored, although waivers were allowed to some companies in the form of individual licenses to continue operating in the oil sector.

After U.S. forces capture Maduro in January 2026, the Trump administration begin to gradually lift sanctions on the Venezuelan interim authorities in order to boost oil sales.

== History and legislation ==
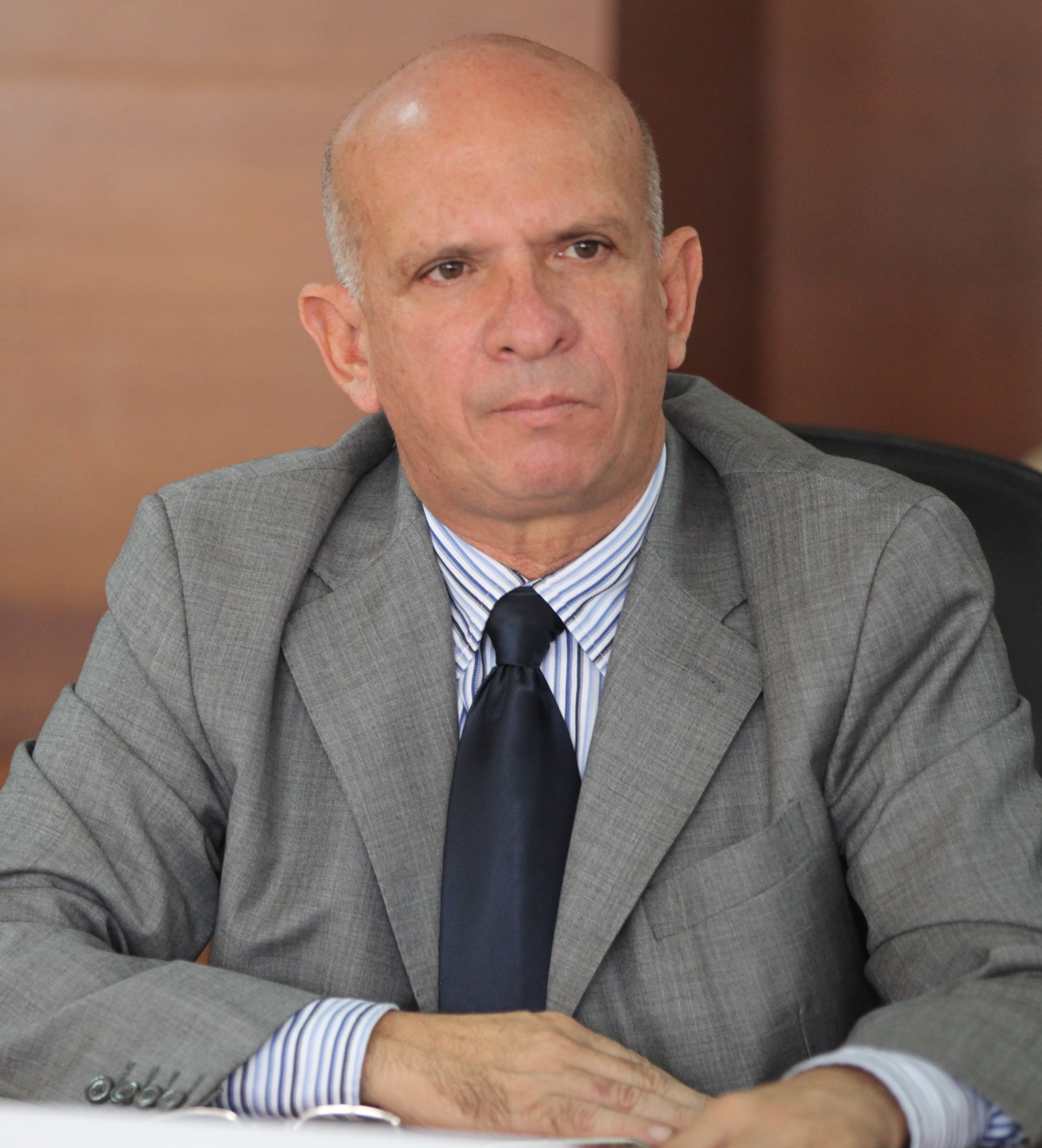
Hugo Carvajal in 2016; the former head of intelligence and confidant of Chávez was sanctioned by the U.S. in 2008, arrested in Spain in 2019, and pled guilty to narcoterrorism charges in the U.S. in 2025.

The U.S. had been concerned about Venezuelan narcotics trafficking since 2005 and Venezuela's lack of cooperation in combatting terrorism since 2006. The U.S. implemented sanctions as a policy tool to combat terrorism-related activity as well as narcotics and human trafficking, corruption and human rights violations, according to the Congressional Research Service. In 2008, Executive Order (EO) 13224 aimed to reduce terrorist funding in Venezuela via sanctions; the United States Department of the Treasury has used the Foreign Narcotics Kingpin Designation Act (Kingpin Act) to sanction at least 22 Venezuelans as of 2019.

Prior to the ongoing crisis in Venezuela, the U.S. Office of Foreign Assets Control (OFAC) sanctioned three current or former Venezuelan government officials in 2008, saying there was evidence they had materially helped the Revolutionary Armed Forces of Colombia (FARC) in the illegal drug trade. The order "[froze] any assets the designated entities and individuals may have under U.S. jurisdiction and prohibit[ed] U.S. persons from conducting financial or commercial transactions involving [the] assets" of Hugo Carvajal, former director of Venezuela's military intelligence (DGIM); Henry Rangel Silva, director of the National Directorate of Intelligence and Prevention Services (DISIP); and Ramón Rodríguez Chacín, former Minister of the Interior. In 2021, Carvajal was arrested by Spanish police in Madrid and extradited to the U.S. in July 2023. He pled guilty to all charges in a U.S. court in 2025.

In 2011, four allies of Hugo Chávez, including a general, two politicians, and an intelligence official, were sanctioned for allegedly helping FARC obtain weapons and smuggle drugs.

U.S. president Barack Obama signed the Venezuela Defense of Human Rights and Civil Society Act of 2014, imposing sanctions on Venezuelan individuals held responsible by the U.S. for human rights violations during the 2014 Venezuelan protests. The Act was extended in 2016 through 31 December 2019. On 2 February 2015, the United States Department of State imposed visa restrictions on Venezuelan officials that were linked to alleged human rights abuses and political corruption. The visa restrictions included family members. Obama issued Executive Order 13692 in March 2015 to block assets or impose travel bans on those "involved in or responsible for the erosion of human rights guarantees, persecution of political opponents, curtailment of press freedoms, use of violence and human rights violations and abuses in response to antigovernment protests, and arbitrary arrest and detention of antigovernment protestors, as well as significant public corruption by senior government officials in the country."

The U.S. maintained both broad and targeted sanctions against the leadership of the governments of Cuba, Nicaragua, and Venezuela. Into 2020, Trump expressed that he believed that the removal of Maduro from office was occurring too slowly and that incremental processes, such as sanctions, did not provide results; he began to consider military options, including a naval blockade.

Through April 2019, the U.S. sanctioned more than 150 companies, vessels and individuals, in addition to revoking visas of 718 individuals.

== On individuals ==
Under EO 13692, the Obama administration sanctioned 7 individuals, and the Trump administration had sanctioned 73 as of 8 March 2019. As of 7 August 2023, the Congressional Research Service said the U.S. maintained sanctions on more than 110 individuals.

=== 2015 ===
Obama issued a presidential order on 9 March 2015 declaring Venezuela a "threat to [U.S.] national security", and ordered the Treasury Department to freeze property and assets of seven Venezuelan officials it held responsible for human rights abuses, repression and at least 43 deaths during demonstrations. Among those sanctioned were Antonio Benavides Torres, former leader of the Venezuelan National Guard, and SEBIN directors Manuel Bernal Martínez and Gustavo González López.

=== 2017 ===
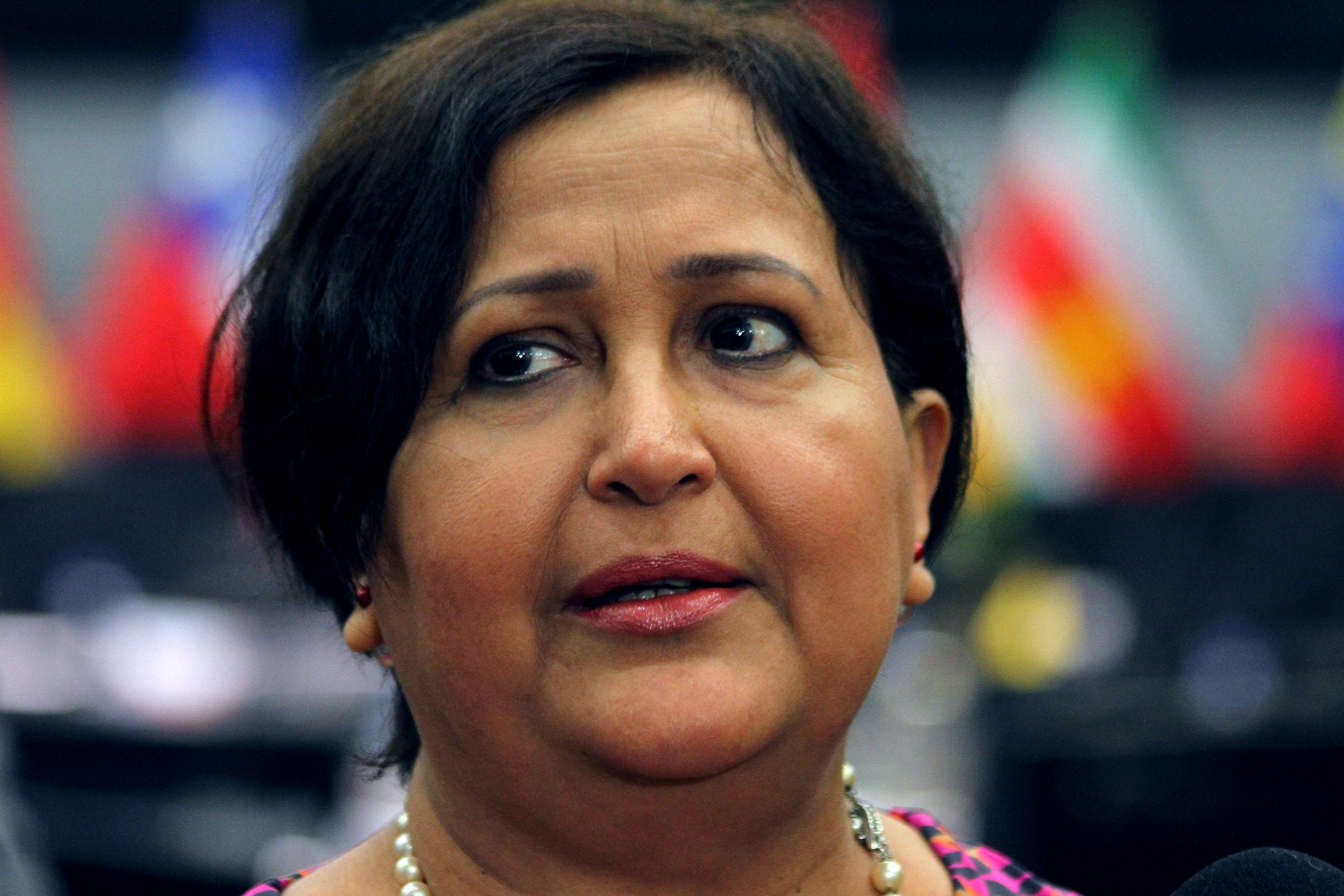
Tibisay Lucena (died 2023), sanctioned for her role in the Venezuelan elections

Tareck El Aissami, Vice President of Economy and Minister for National Industry and Production, and his frontman Samark Jose Lopez Bello were named in February under the Kingpin Act as significant international narcotics traffickers. Five U.S. companies in Florida and an airplane registered in the U.S. were also blocked.

The U.S. Treasury Department sanctioned Maikel Moreno and seven members of the Venezuelan Supreme Justice Tribunal (TSJ) in May for usurping the functions of the Venezuelan National Assembly and permitting Maduro to govern by decree.

In July, thirteen senior officials of the Venezuelan government associated with the 2017 Venezuelan Constituent Assembly elections were sanctioned for what the U.S. labeled as their role in undermining democracy and human rights. Those sanctioned included Elías Jaua, Presidential Commission for the ANC and Minister of Education; Tibisay Lucena, President of the Maduro-controlled National Electoral Council (CNE); Néstor Reverol, Minister of Interior and former Commander General of Venezuelan National Guard (GNB), indicted in 2016 by U.S. for drug conspiracy; Tarek William Saab, Ombudsman and President of Moral Council; Iris Varela ANC member and Prisons Minister; and Carlos Erik Malpica Flores, former finance VP for PDVSA.

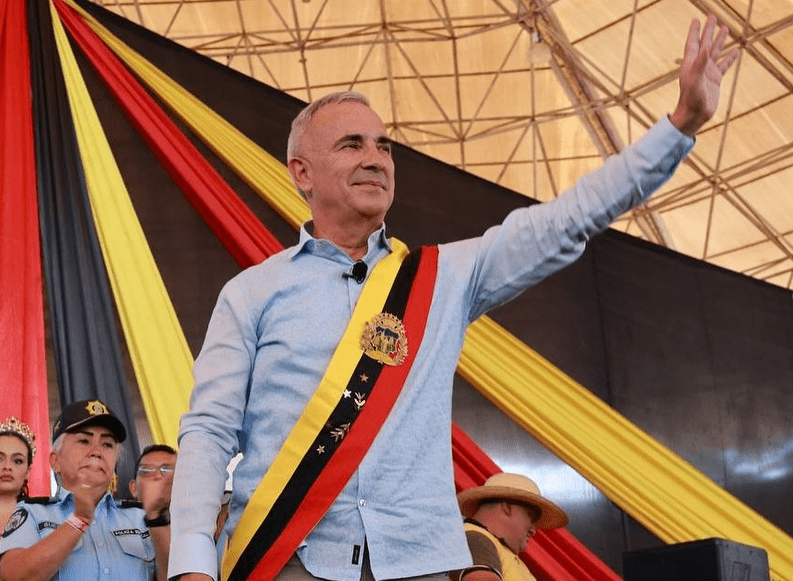
Freddy Bernal

The U.S. State Department condemned the Venezuelan Constituent Assembly election and refused to recognize it. The day after the election, the U.S. sanctioned Maduro, stating that the election "aspires illegitimately to usurp the constitutional role of the democratically elected National Assembly, rewrite the constitution, and impose an authoritarian regime". Maduro became the fourth head of state to be sanctioned by the U.S. government after Bashar al-Assad of Syria, Kim Jong-un of North Korea and Robert Mugabe of Zimbabwe. Maduro fired back at the sanctions during his victory speech saying "I don't obey imperial orders. I'm against the Ku Klux Klan that governs the White House, and I'm proud to feel that way."

The U.S. Treasury Department sanctioned eight officials associated with the 2017 Constituent National Assembly (ANC) in August, for participating in "anti-democratic actions pursuant to Executive Order 13692" by facilitating the "illegitimate Constituent Assembly to further entrench [Maduro's] dictatorship". The individuals sanctioned included Francisco Ameliach and Adán Chávez, the brother of Hugo Chávez.

In November, ten more government officials were added to OFAC's list of Venezuelans sanctioned after the regional elections; the U.S. Treasury Department described the individuals as being "associated with undermining electoral processes, media censorship, or corruption in government-administered food programs in Venezuela". Those sanctioned included Minister Freddy Bernal, who headed the Local Committees for Supply and Production (CLAP) food subsidy program, and was previously named in 2011 as a drug trafficker under the Kingpin Act for aiding FARC.

=== 2018 ===
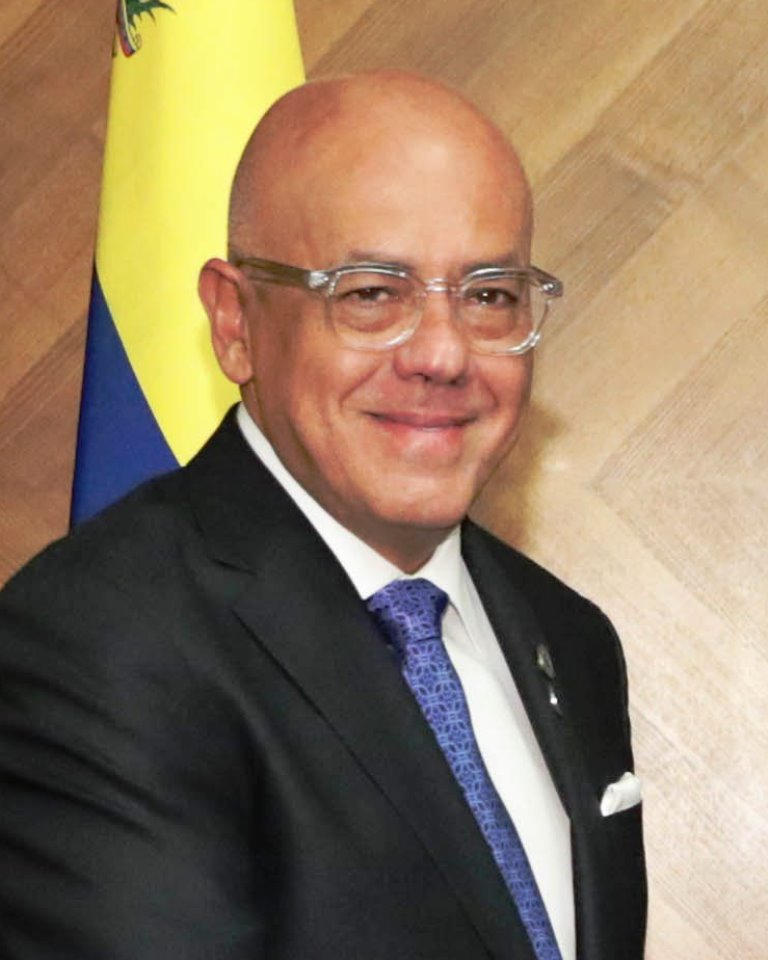
Jorge Rodríguez, National Assembly president and Delcy's brother

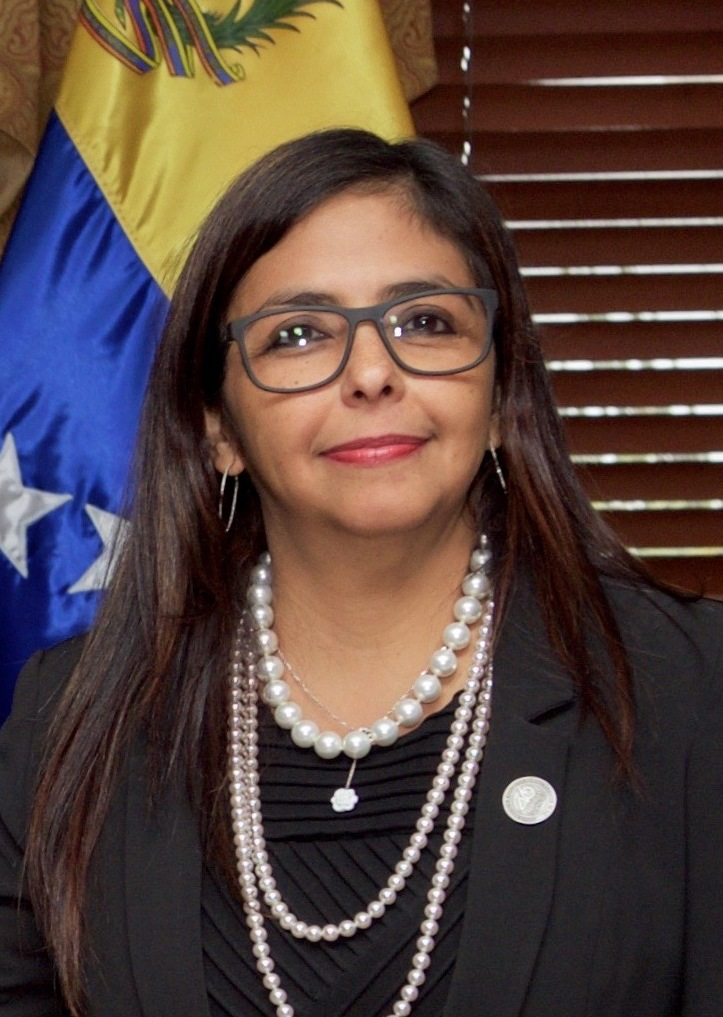
Then Venezuelan Vice President Delcy Rodríguez

The U.S. Treasury Department said on 5 January that corruption and repression continued in Venezuela and four senior military officers were sanctioned. Four more current or former officials were added to the sanctioned list in March 2018.

Just before the May 2018 Venezuelan presidential election, the U.S. sanctioned four Venezuelans and three companies it said were involved in corruption and money laundering including Diosdado Cabello, Chavismo's number two person and President of the ANC, Cabello's wife, Marleny Contreras Hernández de Cabello, Venezuela's Tourism Minister, and Cabello's brother, José David Cabello Rondón, the president of Venezuela's tax authority, SENIAT. The Florida companies were owned or controlled by sanctioned front man Rafael Sarria in Florida. Fourteen other properties owned or controlled by Sarria in Florida and New York were also sanctioned. The U.S. Treasury Department said the Cabello brothers had "approved a money laundering scheme based on illicit financial activities targeting the Venezuelan state-owned oil company Petroleos de Venezuela, S.A. (PDVSA)."

The U.S. Treasury Department seized a private jet and imposed sanctions on Maduro's inner circle in September. Maduro's wife, Cilia Flores, Defense Minister Vladimir Padrino López, Vice President Delcy Rodríguez, and her brother Jorge Rodríguez, Minister of Communications, were sanctioned. Companies owned or controlled in the U.S., British Virgin Islands, and Spain by sanctioned parties were also listed.

=== 2019 ===
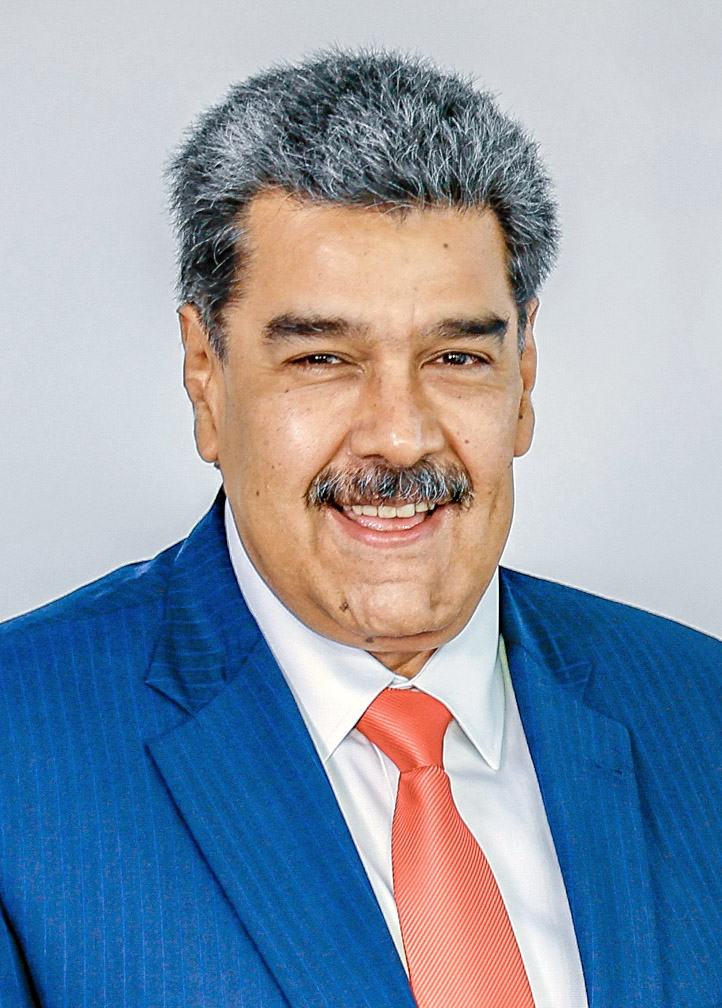
Nicolás Maduro

The U.S. Treasury Department sanctioned seven individuals on 8 January 2019, who they said were benefitting from a corrupt currency exchange scheme. Alejandro Jose Andrade Cedeño, a former national Treasurer, "was sentenced by the U.S. District Court for the Southern District of Florida on November 27, 2018, to 10 years in prison for accepting over $1 billion in bribes for his role" in the scheme. OFAC also sanctioned five other individuals and 23 companies, including Venezuelan private TV network Globovisión and other companies owned or controlled by Raúl Gorrín and Gustavo Perdomo.

On 15 February 2019, officials of Maduro's security and intelligence were sanctioned; the U.S. Treasury Department said they were responsible for torture, human rights abuses, and extrajudicial killings. Manuel Quevedo, the head of PDVSA, was also blacklisted.

During the February 2019 shipping of humanitarian aid to Venezuela, U.S. Vice-president Mike Pence announced that four Venezuelan state governors, who the U.S. said had furthered the humanitarian crisis by participating in the blocking of aid, were added to the sanctions list. On 1 March, six more military and security forces individuals were blacklisted, including members of FAES (Fuerzas de Acciones Especiales), a special police force, who the U.S. alleged helped obstruct the delivery of humanitarian aid.

The U.S. sanctioned Minerven, Venezuela's state-run mining company, and its president, Adrian Antonio Perdomo in March 2019; the U.S. Treasury department said that the Venezuelan military had granted access to criminal organizations in exchange for money.

The U.S. Treasury added sanctions on 17 April to the Central Bank of Venezuela and one of its directors, Iliana Ruzza. Directors Simon Alejandro Zerpa Delgado and William Antonio Contreras were already sanctioned. U.S. National Security Advisor John R. Bolton said the sanction was "aimed at restricting U.S. transactions with the bank and cutting off the bank's access to U.S. currency", as a warning to Russia and others. United States Secretary of the Treasury Steven Mnuchin stated that the sanction was to prevent the Central Bank "from being used as a tool of the illegitimate Maduro regime". Maduro said the sanctions were "totally illegal" and that "Central banks around the world are sacred, all countries respect them. ... To me the empire looks crazy, desperate."

On 26 April 2019, the U.S. Treasury accused Maduro's foreign minister Jorge Arreaza and Judge Carol Padilla of exploiting the U.S. financial system to support Maduro, and blacklisted them. The U.S. State Department described Arreaza as being "at the forefront" of the Maduro administration attempts "to thwart the democratic aspirations of the Venezuelan people", and Padilla as the judge involved in the detention of Roberto Marrero, who was Juan Guaidó's top aide.

Following the Venezuelan uprising on 30 April 2019, the U.S. removed sanctions against former SEBIN chief Manuel Cristopher Figuera, who broke ranks with Maduro, to demonstrate that sanctions could be removed from those who help "restore democratic order" in Venezuela.

The U.S. sanctioned two former Venezuelan government officials, Luis Alfredo Motta Domínguez and Eustiquio Jose Lugo Gomez, on 27 June alleging they were engaging in significant corruption and fraud. The Miami U.S. attorney's office stated that Motta was indicted on seven counts of money laundering and one count of money laundering conspiracy, after awarding US$60 million in contracts to three Florida-based companies in return for bribes. In April, Maduro dismissed Motta as Electricity Minister after a series of March blackouts.

President Maduro's son, Nicolás Maduro Guerra, was sanctioned on 28 June 2019 as a member of Venezuela's Constituent Assembly. The U.S. Treasury Department accused him of maintaining a stranglehold on the economy and suppressing the people of Venezuela.

Following the June death while in custody of Venezuelan navy captain Rafael Acosta Arévalo, the U.S. sanctioned Dirección General de Contrainteligencia Militar (DGCIM) on 11 July 2019, accusing the defense agency of being responsible for his death. On 19 July 2019, Mike Pence announced new sanctions on DGCIM officials who he held responsible for repressing and torturing Venezuelans, stating that the United Nations had reported nearly 7,000 "killings by [the] Maduro regime in the last 18 months".

Five politicians and security officials, who had earlier been sanctioned by the E.U. or Canada, were added to the U.S. sanctions list on 5 November 2019 for alleged corruption and violence during opposition protests.

=== 2020 ===
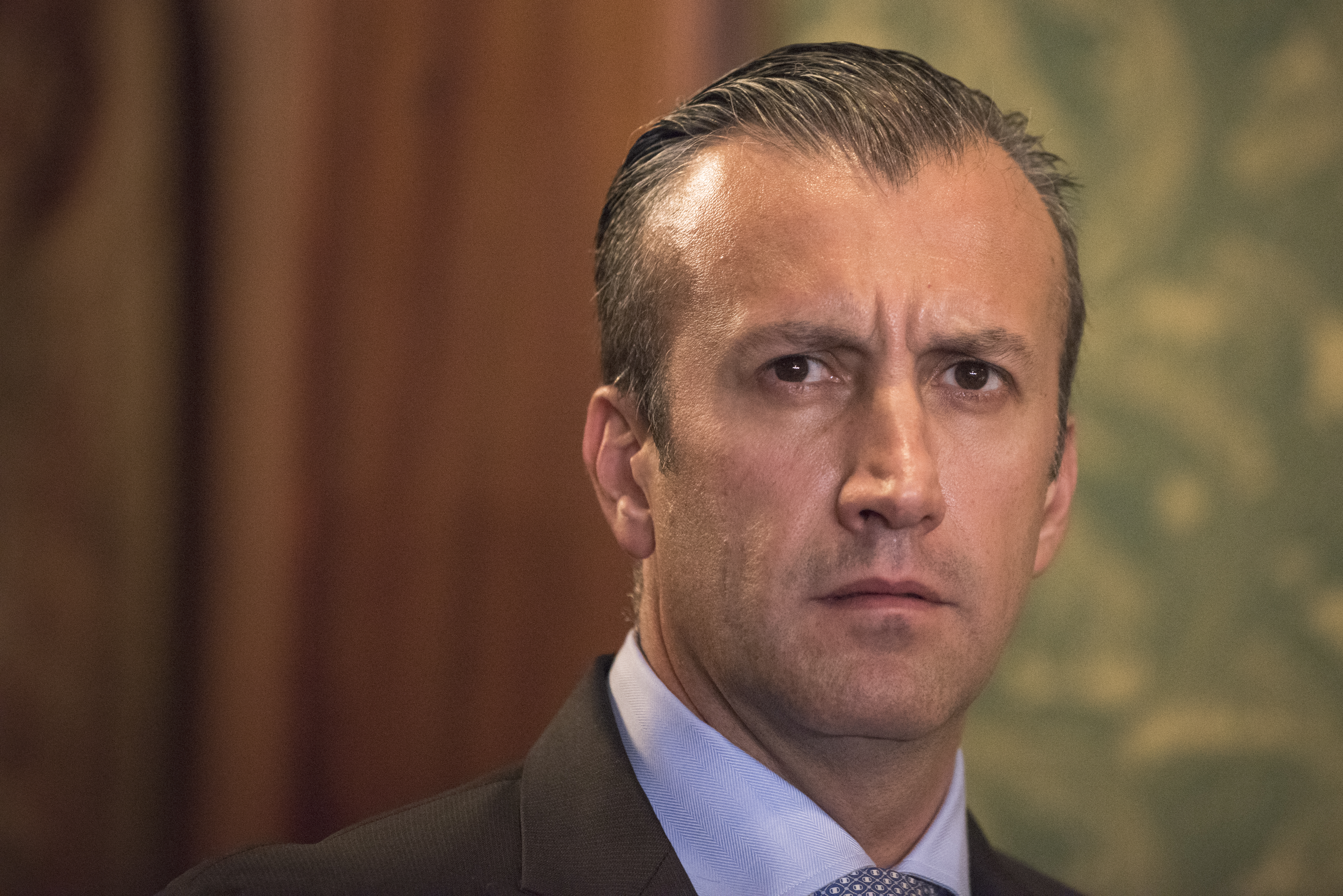
Tareck El Aissami

The U.S. Treasury Department sanctioned seven individuals for their involvement in the disputed January 2020 Venezuelan National Assembly Delegated Committee election that resulted in two claims for the Presidency of the National Assembly: one by legislator Luis Parra, later supported by Maduro, and one by the incumbent Juan Guaidó. According to U.S. Treasury Secretary Mnuchin, the U.S. blacklisted the Venezuelan lawmakers "who, at the bidding of Maduro, attempted to block the democratic process in Venezuela". Those sanctioned in addition to Parra included Franklyn Duarte, José Gregorio Noriega, Negal Morales, José Brito, Conrado Pérez, Adolfo Superlano.

On 22 September 2020, the U.S. Treasury described five sanctioned individuals as supporting, manipulating and rigging the upcoming 2020 Venezuelan parliamentary elections: Miguel Ponente, Guillermo Luces, José Bernabé Gutiérrez, Chaim Bucaran and Williams Benavides.

The company Ex-Cle Soluciones Biometricas CA, and individuals associated with, were sanctioned on 18 December for providing services for the 2020 parliamentary election, which the U.S. alleges were fraudulent; Maduro responded that the sanctions were "stupid" and that a third of eligible voters had participated.

OFAC sanctioned the president and board chairman, Didier Casimiro, of Rosneft on 18 February 2020, for supporting Maduro's government by operating in the oil sector.

On 26 March 2020, the U.S. State Department offered a $15 million reward on Nicolás Maduro, and $10 million each on Diosdado Cabello, Hugo Carvajal, Clíver Alcalá Cordones and Tareck El Aissami, for information to bring those individuals to justice for alleged drug trafficking and narco-terrorism.

Two friends of Maduro and his son, Nicolas Ernesto Maduro Guerra, were sanctioned on 23 July 2020 for their alleged role in a "financial mechanism of an illicit gold scheme", according to Reuters.

=== 2022–2024: sanctions relief ===
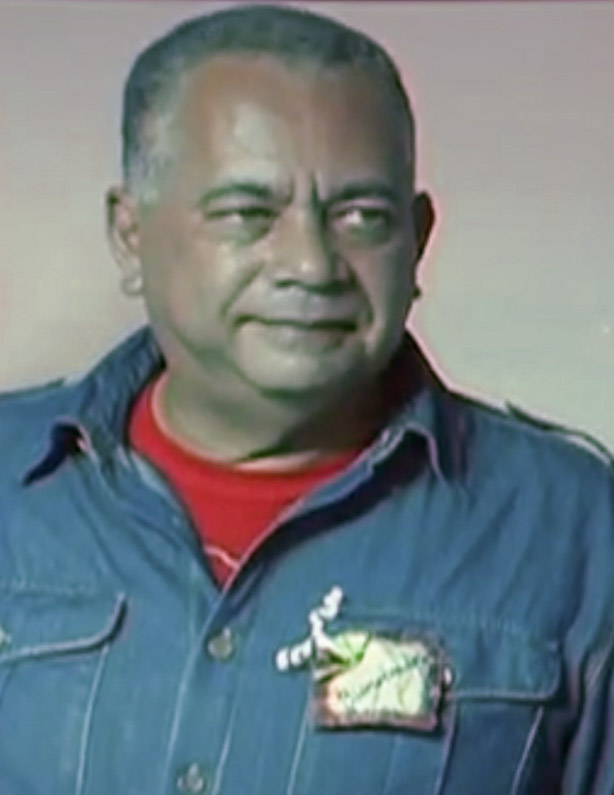
Elvis Amoroso, head of CNE, Venezuelan's electoral body, and former Comptroller General

After Joe Biden took office, his administration reviewed existing sanctions and in 2022 lowered some of the restrictions in the petroleum sector. Chevron Corporation, which had existing investments in Venezuela, was allowed to increase production for sales to the U.S. As of November 2022, the Biden administration had not imposed any new sanctions on Venezuela and the Associated Press reported that some companies could be flouting the sanctions imposed by the Trump administration. Crude oil exports by July 2023, driven by Chevron and other new agreements allowed under sanctions, rose to their highest level in over three years. Countries like Cuba, China and Iran continued trading with Venezuela, and China become the main source of Venezuela's petroleum revenue in 2023.

In October 2023, the Biden administration eased some sanctions based on an election agreement signed in Barbados between the Maduro government and opposition parties; an agreement was negotiated in which five people classified as political prisoners were released in exchange for the U.S. partially removing sanctions on the oil, gas and gold industries and secondary trading of bonds. U.S. Secretary of State Antony Blinken stated Maduro would have another month to remove bans on candidates for the 2024 presidential election.

On 17 April 2024, the U.S. announced that some of these sanctions would be reinstated because the Barbados Agreement had not been fully honored and the leading opposition candidate María Corina Machado had not been allowed to run in presidential elections. Waivers to operate in spite of the sanctions were extended to companies with existing oil and gas assets and production in Venezuela; in addition to Chevron, these included Spain's Repsol, Italy's Eni, France's Maurel & Prom, and BP in Trinidad and Tobago, with as many as 50 licenses being reviewed as of May 2024. Sources told Reuters that India's Reliance Industries and Jindal Steel and Power were also granted waivers after sanctions were reimposed.

After sanctions relief, Spain's 2024 imports through July of Venezuelan petroleum tripled from those of the same period in 2023. With Chevron telling the Biden Administration that it is important that it be allowed to continue operations in Venezuela, where it accounts for 20% of exports, and with Spain becoming a significant importer of Venezuelan petroleum, Venezuela's overall exports increased to the highest level in four years by August. Commenting on the result of these exemptions from sanctions, a Caracas Chronicles article stated that "in reality the U.S. isn't reverting this sentence, but granting specific licenses to Western oil companies ... to operate in Venezuela", and National Review stated that sanctions had been "watered down" rather than reinstated by the Biden Administration. The Wall Street Journal wrote on 5 September 2024: "Democrats are trying to keep a lid on gasoline prices in an election year, and so far representatives for the oil industry have succeeded in persuading the administration to keep Venezuelan oil flowing." A former PDVSA board member, Pedro Burelli, told The Wall Street Journal that: "Chevron ended up front-running all other interests the U.S. said it had with regard to Venezuela—democracy, the fight for human rights, migration and the fight against corruption".

Following the 2024 Venezuelan presidential election and the resulting political crisis, the U.S. imposed sanctions on 16 individuals on 12 September but did not impose additional sanctions in the petroleum sector; unnamed officials have stated that the Biden Administration was concerned that sanctions could lead to increased immigration or higher oil prices prior to the November 2024 U.S. elections.

=== 2024 ===
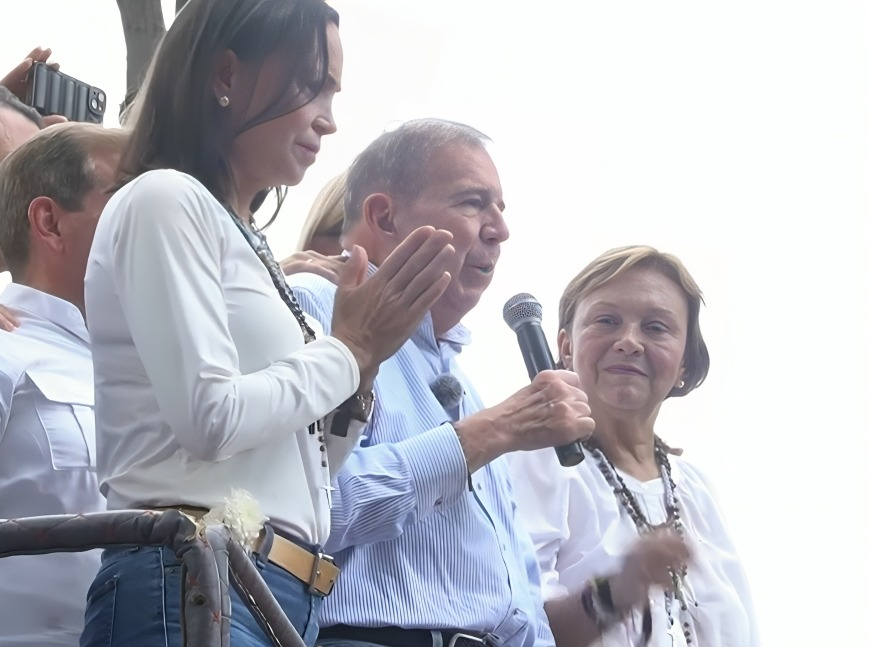
María Corina Machado and Edmundo González Urrutia along with his wife, 30 July 2024, following the 2024 Venezuelan presidential election

Following the declaration without evidence by Venezuela's National Electoral Council (CNE) and validation by the Supreme Tribunal of Justice (TSJ) that Maduro had won the 28 July 2024 presidential election, condemned as fraudulent, Reuters reported on 21 August 2024 that the U.S. was reviewing a list of 60 individuals and their family members for possible sanctions.

On 12 September 16 individuals associated with Maduro and the subsequent repression were sanctioned by the U.S., referencing Maduro's "fraudulent and illegitimate claims of victory and his brutal crackdown on free expression following the election". Among the sanctioned were five members of the TSJ, the lower-court judge who issued a warrant for the arrest of opposition candidate Edmundo González, the CNE, and "military and intelligence officials accused of post-election repression", along with "visa restrictions on an unspecified number" of others.

Those sanctioned included Caryslia Rodríguez, the head of the TSJ who issued the ruling validating Maduro's win, along with the vice-president of the TSJ Fanny Márquez Cordero and others; military prosecutor Dinorah Bustamante; Edward Miguel Briceño Cisneros and Luis Ernesto Dueñez Reyes, the judge and prosecutor responsible for the arrest warrant against González; and military figures including Domingo Hernández Lárez from the National Bolivarian Armed Forces of Venezuela.

Venezuela's Foreign Minister Yvan Gil called the sanctions a "crime of aggression ... illegitimate and illegal".

Amid allegations of fraud and repression that followed the election, 21 senior officials of the Maduro government were sanctioned by the U.S. on 27 November 2024. Those sanctioned were "security and cabinet-level officials" alleged by the U.S. to have "carried out Maduro's orders to repress civil society in his efforts to fraudulently declare himself the winner" of the election.

=== 2025 ===
Following the disputed July 2024 Venezuelan presidential election, Maduro was inaugurated for a third term as president on 10 January 2025; that day, the U.S., E.U., U.K. and Canada placed new sanctions on Venezuelan individuals. U.S. Secretary of State Blinken stated that the U.S. "does not recognize Nicolas Maduro as the president of Venezuela" and a U.S. Treasury Under Secretary, Bradley Smith, added that the U.S. stood with its "likeminded partners" in "solidarity with the people's vote for new leadership and rejects Maduro's fraudulent claim of victory". Maduro replied that the "outgoing government of the United States doesn't know how to take revenge on us". Among those sanctioned by the U.S. was Héctor Obregón Pérez, the new head of PDVSA. The Biden administration continued authorizing Chevron and other oil companies to operate in Venezuela.

Giovanni Vicente Mosquera Serrano, an alleged leader of the gang Tren de Aragua (TdA) who is on the FBI Ten Most Wanted Fugitives list, was sanctioned on 24 June, indicted in the U.S. for drug trafficking, and a $3 million reward was offered for information leading to his arrest. The following month, six more alleged leaders and "key members" of the gang (Hector Rusthenford Guerrero Flores, Yohan Jose Romero, Josue Angel Santana Pena, Wilmer Jose Perez Castillo, Wendy Marbelys Rios Gomez, and Felix Anner Castillo Rondon) were sanctioned. In December 2025, the reward for Mosquera was raised to $5 million.

Labeling them as "affiliates of the terrorist cartel Tren de Aragua", who the U.S. alleges have "provided material support" to TdA and engaged in money laundering for TdA, the U.S. Treasury sanctioned on 3 December 2025 additional individuals, including model and actress Jimena Araya, and companies during the Trump administration's attack on drug trafficking. Along with Jimena Romina Araya Navarro (a.k.a. "Rosita"), OFAC sanctioned her manager, Eryk Manuel Landaeta Hernandez, and Kenffersso Jhosue Sevilla Arteaga, Richard Jose Espinal Quintero, Noe Manases Aponte Cordova, Asdrubal Rafael Escobar Cabrera, Cheison Royer Guerrero Palma, and associated businesses, Maiquetia VIP Bar Restaurant, Global Import Solutions S.A., Eryk Producciones SAS, and Yakera y Lane SAS.

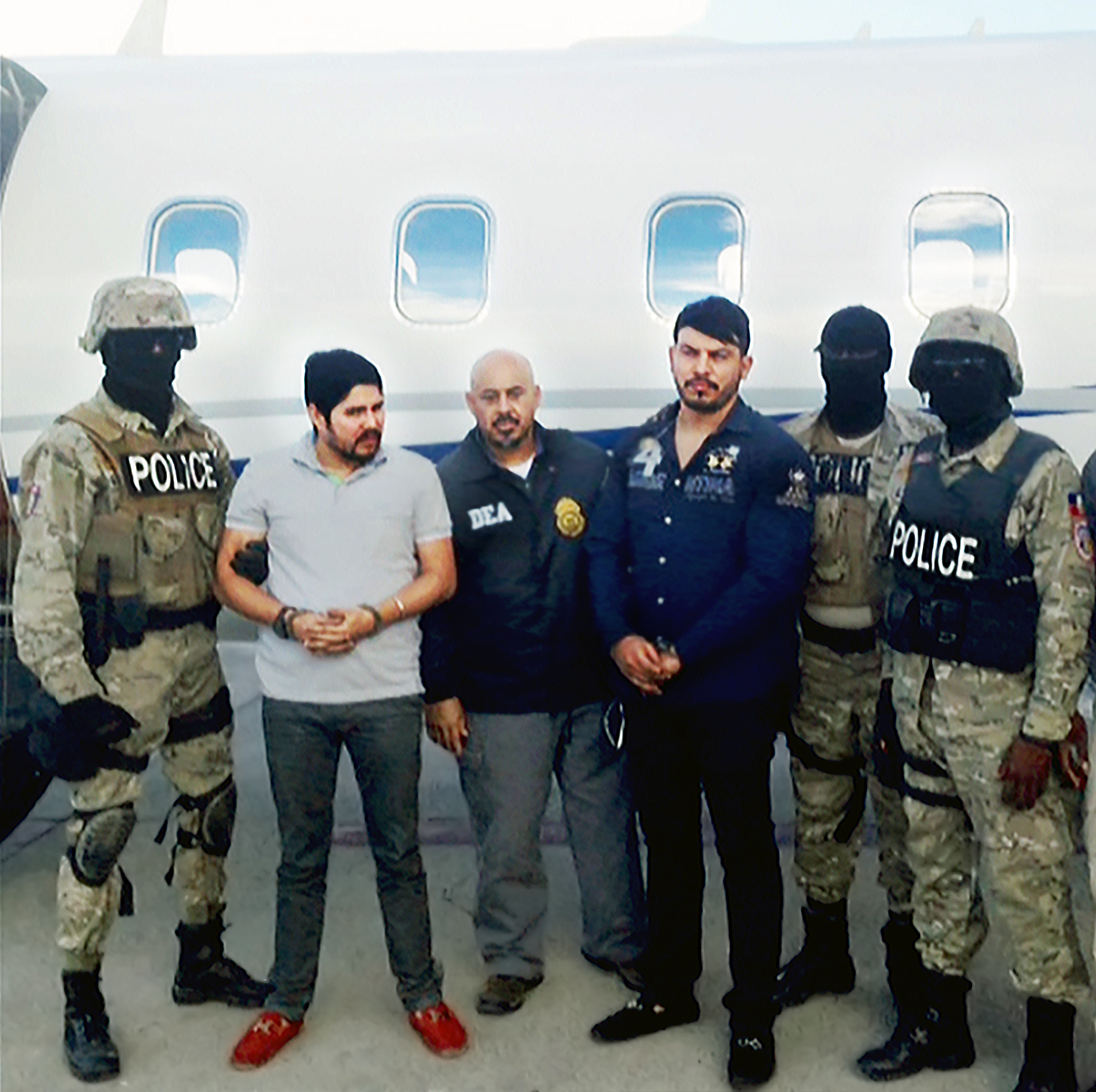
Efrain Antonio Campo Flores and Franqui Francisco Flores de Freitas, nephews of Maduro's wife Cilia Flores, after their arrest by the United States Drug Enforcement Administration on 10 November 2015

The day after the 10 December seizure of oil tanker Skipper by the U.S. off the coast of Venezuela, additional sanctions targeting Maduro's family and oil shipments were imposed. According to the Miami Herald, the sanctions aim to reverse loosening of sanctions under the Biden administration, which failed to help achieve a fair presidential election in 2024, and to "disrupt what the [U.S. Treasury] described as a persistent web of corruption, narcotrafficking and sanctions evasions that continues to sustain Maduro's 'illegitimate' government". Sanctioned were six companies and six vessels associated with those companies that had recently transported Venezuelan crude. The U.S. alleged that the six supertankers (and associated companies) are part of a shadow fleet that uses techniques to avoid transmitting their location and "have engaged in deceptive and unsafe shipping practices". They are H. Constance (Poweroy Investment Limited), Kiara M (Arctic Voyager Incorporated), Lattafa (Ready Great Limited), Monique (Full Happy Limited), Tamia (Sino Marine Services Limited) and White Crane (Myra Marine Limited).

Ramón Carretero Napolitano, a Panamanian businessman who the U.S. alleges has profited from business ventures with relatives of Maduro and his wife, Cilia Flores, to sell Venezuelan oil, was also sanctioned. The New York Times stated, based on a report from Armando.info and other anonymous sources, that Carretero was "one of the largest traders of Venezuelan oil" and the "main person managing the flow of oil between Cuba and Venezuela".

Three nephews of Flores sanctioned on 11 December are cousins Efraín Antonio Campo Flores and Franqui Francisco Flores de Freitas, and Carlos Erik Malpica Flores. The cousins known as the "narco-nephews" were convicted and imprisoned on drug charges in the U.S. in 2016, and released by the Biden administration in a 2022 prisoner exchange. The U.S. alleges they continued to traffic drugs in Venezuela since their release. Malpica Flores was sanctioned in 2017, and removed from the sanctioned list by the Biden administration in 2022 during negotiations to encourage free and fair presidential elections in 2024.

Maduro's government denies criminal links and states that the U.S. wants regime change to gain control of Venezuela's oil.

On 19 December, seven more individuals from the Malpica Flores family, along with family members of Carretero, were sanctioned. Those extended family members were: the sister of Cilia Flores and mother of Carlos Malpica Flores, Eloisa Flores de Malpica; the father, sister, wife and daughter of Carlos Malpica Flores, Carlos Evelio Malpica Torrealba, Iriamni Malpica Flores, Damaris del Carmen Hurtado Perez, and Erica Patricia Malpica Hurtado; and relatives of Carretero, Roberto Carretero Napolitano and Vicente Luis Carretero Napolitano.

Jose Jesus Urdaneta Gonzalez and the Venezuelan company he chairs, Empresa Aeronautica Nacional SA, were sanctioned on 30 December for trade with Iran of drones. On 31 December, four oil tankers and the Chinese companies that own them were sanctioned. The ships (and the owner/operators) are: Nord Star (Corniola Limited, and Krape Myrtle Co LTD); Rosalind, also named Lunar TID (Winky International Limited); and Della and Valiant (Aries Global Investment).

=== 2026 ===
On 3 January, in Operation Absolute Resolve, then-Venezuelan leader Nicolás Maduro was captured by U.S. forces and extradited to the United States for trial. Following the operation, with his successor Delcy Rodriguez cooperating with the U.S. to manage the transition, the U.S. Department of Treasury granted Venezuela general licenses to restore the country's oil production and promote its economic growth.

== On industries ==
Trump issued EO 13850 on 1 November 2018 to block the assets of anyone involved in alleged corruption in the gold sector, or "any other sector of the economy as determined in the future by the Secretary of the Treasury". Mnuchin announced on 28 January 2019 that EO 13850 applied to the petroleum sector.

Three additional Executive Orders were applied in 2017 and 2018. EO 13808, issued on 27 July 2017, prohibits the Venezuelan government from accessing U.S. financial markets, allowing for "exceptions to minimize the impact on the Venezuelan people and U.S. economic interests. The sanctions restricted the Venezuelan government's access to US debt and equity markets." The restriction includes the state-run oil company, PDVSA. Issued in 2018, EO 13827 prohibited the use of Venezuelan digital currency, and EO 13835 prohibited the purchase of Venezuelan debt.

=== Petroleum ===
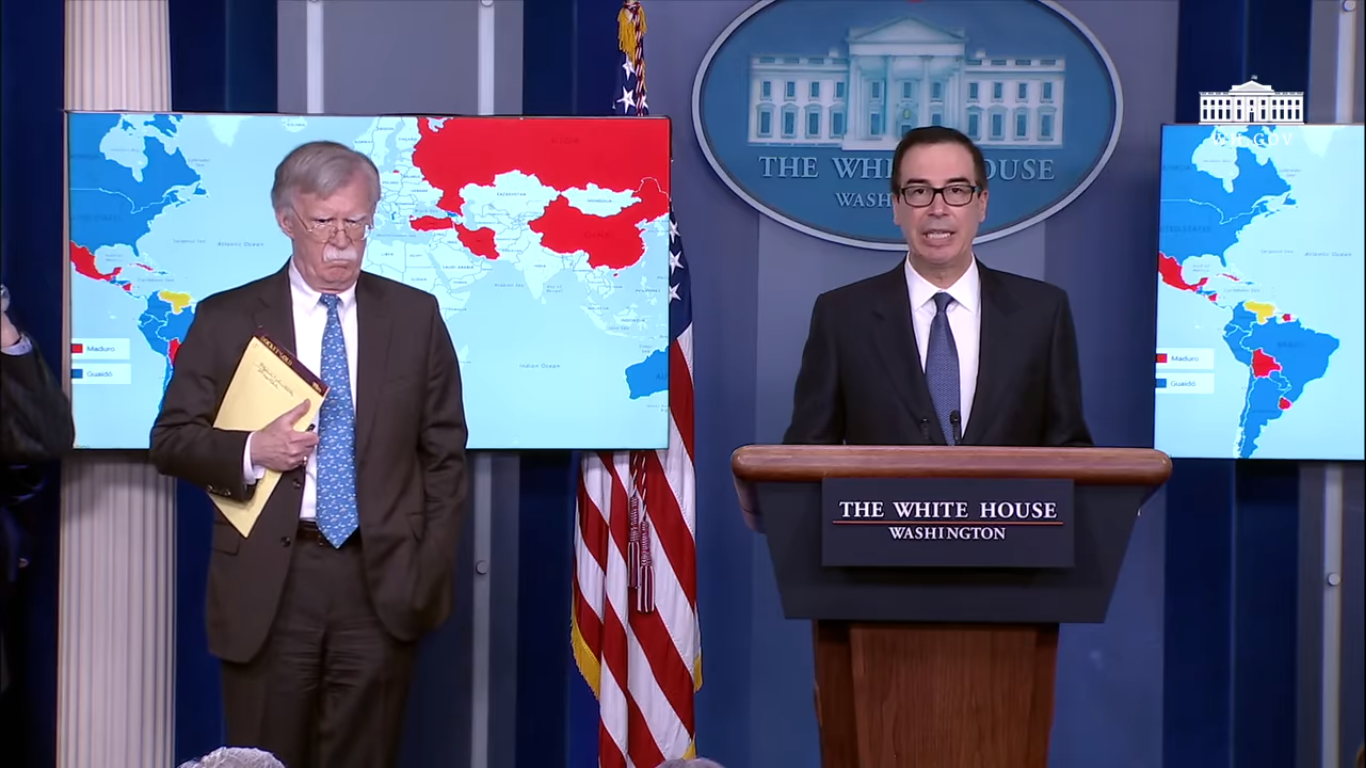
U.S. National Security Advisor John R. Bolton and Treasury Secretary Steven Mnuchin announce PDVSA sanctions.

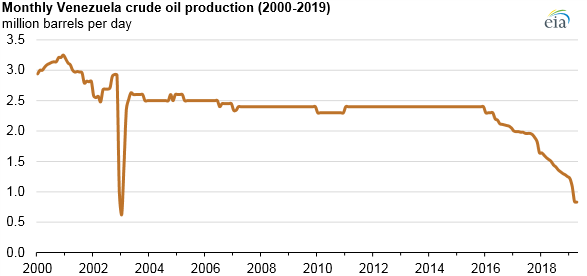
Venezuelan crude oil production, January 2000 – April 2019

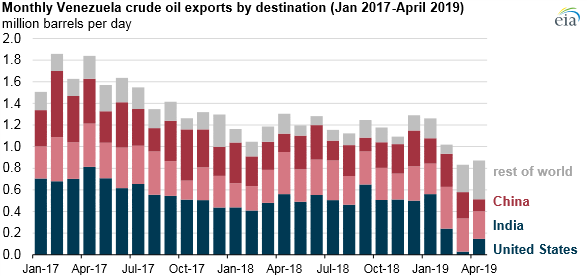
Venezuelan crude oil export destinations, January 2017 – April 2019

Trump imposed economic sanctions in August 2017 that affected Venezuela's petroleum industry by prohibiting the trading of Venezuelan bonds in U.S. markets. The New York Times said that loopholes in the sanctions would permit "financing of most commercial trade ... and financing for humanitarian services to the Venezuelan people", and quoted analysts who said the sanctions would not be a "lethal blow". The White House saw the measures as a way to "protect the United States financial system from complicity in Venezuela's corruption and in the impoverishment of the Venezuelan people" without disallowing humanitarian aid while preventing the "fire sale" of Venezuelan assets.

The U.S. imposed additional sanctions on PDVSA on 28 January 2019 to pressure Maduro to resign during the 2019 Venezuelan presidential crisis. The sanctions prevented PDVSA from being paid for petroleum exports to the U.S., froze $7 billion of PDVSA's U.S. assets and prevented U.S. firms from exporting naphtha to Venezuela. Bolton estimated the expected loss to the Venezuelan economy at more than $11 billion in 2019.

In February 2019, Maduro ordered PDVSA to move its European office to Moscow to protect its overseas assets from U.S. sanctions. The Russian state-run oil company Rosneft had supplied naphtha to Venezuela and continued to purchase Venezuelan petroleum, which it said was through contracts that were in place prior to the U.S. sanctions. Exports of Venezuela's heavy crude oil depend on diluents that were imported from the U.S. before sanctions; Rosneft chartered a ship to load thinners from Malta and deliver them to Venezuela on 22 March, and arranged for Venezuelan crude oil to be processed in India. Other companies including India's Reliance Industries Limited, Spain's Repsol, and commodity trading companies Trafigura and Vitol continued to supply Venezuela's oil industry as of 11 April 2019. On 17 April,

On 18 February 2020, OFAC sanctioned Rosneft Trading S.A. for supporting Maduro's government by operating in the oil sector. On 12 March 2020, a Swiss subsidiary of Rosneft, TNK Trading International S.A., was blacklisted for helping Rosneft evade sanctions; U.S. Treasury stated that TNK bought 14 million barrels of Venezuelan crude in one month.

The Venezuelan National Assembly had been looking at ways to access Venezuela's overseas cash and facilities. PDVSA's US subsidiary Citgo announced in February 2019 that it would formally cut ties with PDVSA to comply with U.S. sanctions on Venezuela, and halted payments to PDVSA. Guaidó and the National Assembly appointed a new Citgo board of directors under Chairperson Luisa Palacios, and the National Assembly authorized Guaidó's appointment of a new ad hoc board of PDVSA, Citgo, Pdvsa Holding Inc, Citgo Holding Inc. and Citgo Petroleum Corporation. Although control of PDVSA assets in Venezuela remained with Maduro, Guaidó named a new PDVSA board. With Citgo under the control of Guaidó's administration, the U.S. Treasury Department extended its license to operate in spite of sanctions.

Stating it was a "sign of the growing dependence of Venezuela's cash-strapped government on Russia", Reuters reported on 18 April 2019 that the Maduro administration was bypassing sanctions by funneling cash from petroleum sales through Russia's Rosneft. Reliance denied reports that it was in violation of U.S. sanctions and stated that its purchases of Venezuelan oil through Rosneft were approved by the U.S. State Department. April oil exports were steady at a million barrels daily, "partially due to inventory drains", with most shipments to buyers from India and China. Even with sanctions, shipments to Cuba were unchanged.

Beginning in late 2019, the US asked foreign firms not to send gasoline to Venezuela as part of the sanctions on PDVSA.

==== Cuban oil shipments ====
The U.S. Treasury sanctioned two companies on 5 April 2019 that had shipped Venezuelan oil to Cuba, alleging that Cuban personnel and advisors helped the Maduro government maintain power; the companies were Liberia-based Ballito Bay Shipping Inc., the owner of the Despina Andrianna, and the Greek company ProPer In Management Inc., the operator of the vessel that was used for an oil shipment to Cuba. Another 34 ships owned by PDVSA were added to the sanction list. The U.S. sanctioned nine ships and four more shipping companies on 12 April 2019: Liberian companies Jennifer Navigation Ltd., Large Range Ltd. and Lima Shipping Corp.; and Italian PB Tankers. An unnamed U.S. senior official told Bloomberg that these companies and vessels accounted for as much as half of the 50,000 barrels daily of oil that "Venezuela sends to Cuba in exchange for the social, intelligence and strategic support Havana provides Maduro". Cuba denies any influence on Venezuela's military and—along with Russia, China, Turkey and Iran—is determined to defend Maduro according to Bloomberg.

In response to the arrest of National Assembly members, the U.S. Treasury sanctioned on 10 May 2019 two shipping companies, and two ships, that transported oil from Venezuela to Cuba between late 2018 and March 2019. Both ships sanctioned carried Panama flags: the tanker Ocean Elegance was owned by Monsoon Navigation Corporation, and Leon Dias by Serenity Martitime Limited.

Sanctions on PB Tankers S.P.A. were lifted in July 2019, and on Lima Shipping Corporation and Serenity Maritime Limited in September 2019.

The Cuban state-run oil import and export company, Cubametales, was sanctioned on 3 July 2019 by OFAC; a Treasury press release said it had facilitated oil imports to Cuba from Venezuela in exchange for defense support, intelligence, and security assistance. Cuba continued to receive shipments, and four more companies facilitating oil shipments from Venezuela to Cuba were sanctioned in September. A company based in Cyprus (Caroil Transport Marine Ltd) and three Panamanian companies (Trocana World Inc, Tovase Development Corp and Bluelane Overseas SA) were sanctioned, along with four ships owned by those companies. In November, the Cuban company Corporacion Panamericana SA was blacklisted for helping Cubametales evade sanctions.

==== Petrocaribe ====
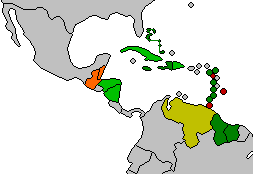
Venezuela Petrocaribe members and CARICOM members Petrocaribe members not part of CARICOM CARICOM members not part of Petrocaribe

Through Petrocaribe, a regional oil procurement agreement between Venezuela and Caribbean member states, Caribbean countries including Haiti and Jamaica had been able to finance 40% of their Venezuelan crude oil purchases over 25 years at 1% interest and Cuba received free oil in exchange for medical services. Reuters said, "The Caribbean region has long relied on oil and gas from Venezuela, which offered cheap financing through a program called Petrocaribe, though shipments have declined in recent years because of production problems at Venezuela's state-owned oil company PDVSA." Research by the journalism group Connectas said that Venezuela had spent $28 billion worth of oil to buy support from 14 Caribbean countries; according to the Connectas study the social benefits that were intended for the countries of Petrocaribe were not realized, which they say was ignored by the Venezuelan government because Petrocaribe countries were intended to protect Venezuela's sovereignty in international organizations like the UN and OAS.

Several leaders of Caribbean countries supporting Maduro criticized the US sanctions, saying their support for Maduro was based on principles, not oil, and that sanctions were affecting their countries' supply, debt payments, and the region's stability. The director of the Latin America and Caribbean Energy Program at the University of Texas at Austin, Jorge Piñón, said the supply cuts to these Caribbean countries were not due to the sanctions, but the mismanagement of PDVSA. When Chávez was elected, Venezuela was producing 3.5 million barrels per day of crude oil; as of March 2019, production was about 1 million barrels per day, and Piñón said those countries should have seen the problems coming. Gaston Browne, Prime Minister of Antigua and Barbuda, and others criticized the US intent in the region, saying that "Washington should provide more aid to these nations and not spend billions on useless wars". With the Venezuelan crisis dividing Caribbean countries, those countries that did not recognize Maduro were invited to meet with Trump in March 2019. Trump promised more investment to the countries supporting Guaidó (Bahamas, Dominican Republic, Haiti, Jamaica and Saint Lucia), although "the White House did not specifically tie the carrot of investment to that support".

=== Gold ===
Venezuela's third-largest export (after crude oil and refined petroleum products) in 2019 was gold. The country's gold production is controlled by the military and is mined under dangerous conditions. The World Gold Council reported in January 2019 that Venezuela's foreign-held gold reserves had fallen by 69% to US$8.4 billion during Maduro's presidency, but that it was hard to track where the gold was going. Central Bank gold holdings decreased in November 2018 from US$6.1 billion to US$5.5 billion; the last independent observer to access the vault where gold is stored was Francisco Rodríguez, who saw an estimated US$15 billion in 2014. Reuters reported that 20 tons were removed from the vaults in 2018, and 23 tons of mined gold were taken to Istanbul, Turkey. In the first nine months of 2018, Venezuela's gold exports to Turkey rose from zero in the previous year to US$900 million.

On 1 November 2018 Trump signed an executive order to "ban US persons from dealing with entities and individuals involved with 'corrupt or deceptive' gold sales from Venezuela".

In mid-February 2019, National Assembly legislator Angel Alvarado said that about eight tons of gold had been taken from the vault while the head of the Central Bank was abroad. In March, Ugandan investigators reported that 7.4 tonnes of gold worth over US$300 million could have been smuggled into that country.

The U.S. Treasury Department sanctioned Minerven, Venezuela's state-run mining company, in March 2019.

Government sources said another eight tonnes of gold was taken out of the Central Bank in the first week of April 2019; the government source said that there were 100 tonnes left. The gold was removed while the bank was not fully operational because of the 2019 Venezuelan blackouts and minimal staff was present; the destination of the gold was not known. According to Bloomberg, the Central Bank sold 9.5 tonnes of gold on 10 May and 3 more tonnes some days later. Reuters estimated in March 2020 that there were about 90 tonnes of gold left in the country, compared to 129 tonnes at the start of 2019.

Between 2013 and 2016, Venezuela shipped US$5.2 billion worth of gold to Switzerland.

=== Banking and finance ===
Trump signed an order on 19 March 2018 that prohibited people in the US from making any type of transaction with digital currency emitted by or in the name of the government of Venezuela as of 9 January 2018, referencing the Petro token. He said the crypto-currency had been designed in February 2018 to "circumvent US sanctions" and access international financing.

On 11 March 2019, the U.S. sanctioned the Russian bank Evrofinance Mosnarbank, a joint venture of Russian and Venezuelan state-owned companies. The U.S. Treasury Department said the Moscow-based bank was an economic lifeline for Maduro's administration.

After the detention of Guaidó's chief of staff, Roberto Marrero, in March 2019, the US Treasury Department responded by placing sanctions on the Venezuelan bank BANDES and its subsidiaries. Univision stated this action "put 'the entire banking sector' on notice" that Venezuelan financial transactions could be sanctioned. China Development Bank had paid billions of dollars through BANDES to the Venezuelan government in exchange for crude oil as of March 2019; the sanctions would make it difficult for Venezuela to restructure its US$20 billion debt with China. U.S. Treasury Secretary Mnuchin said that BANDES had become a way for Maduro administration "insiders" to "move funds abroad in an attempt to prop up Maduro", circumventing the purpose of the bank to help the Venezuelan people.

The U.S. Treasury added sanctions to the Central Bank of Venezuela on 17 April 2019. Mnuchin stated that the sanction would "inhibit most Central Bank activities undertaken" by the Maduro administration, but "ensure that regular debit and credit card transactions can proceed and personal remittances and humanitarian assistance continue unabated". The new sanctions closed some loopholes that allowed for continued financing of the government; the Central Bank had been able to obtain loans without seeking approval from the National Assembly, and sold gold to the central banks of other countries. By interrupting the foreign exchange handled by the Central Bank, PDVSA purchases of production supplies were impacted.

The Venezuelan banking sanctions caused a rippled effect in that the New York Federal Reserve decided to restrict opening of new accounts in Puerto Rico's offshore banking industry, and planned tighter restrictions in that area.

=== CLAP food subsidy program ===
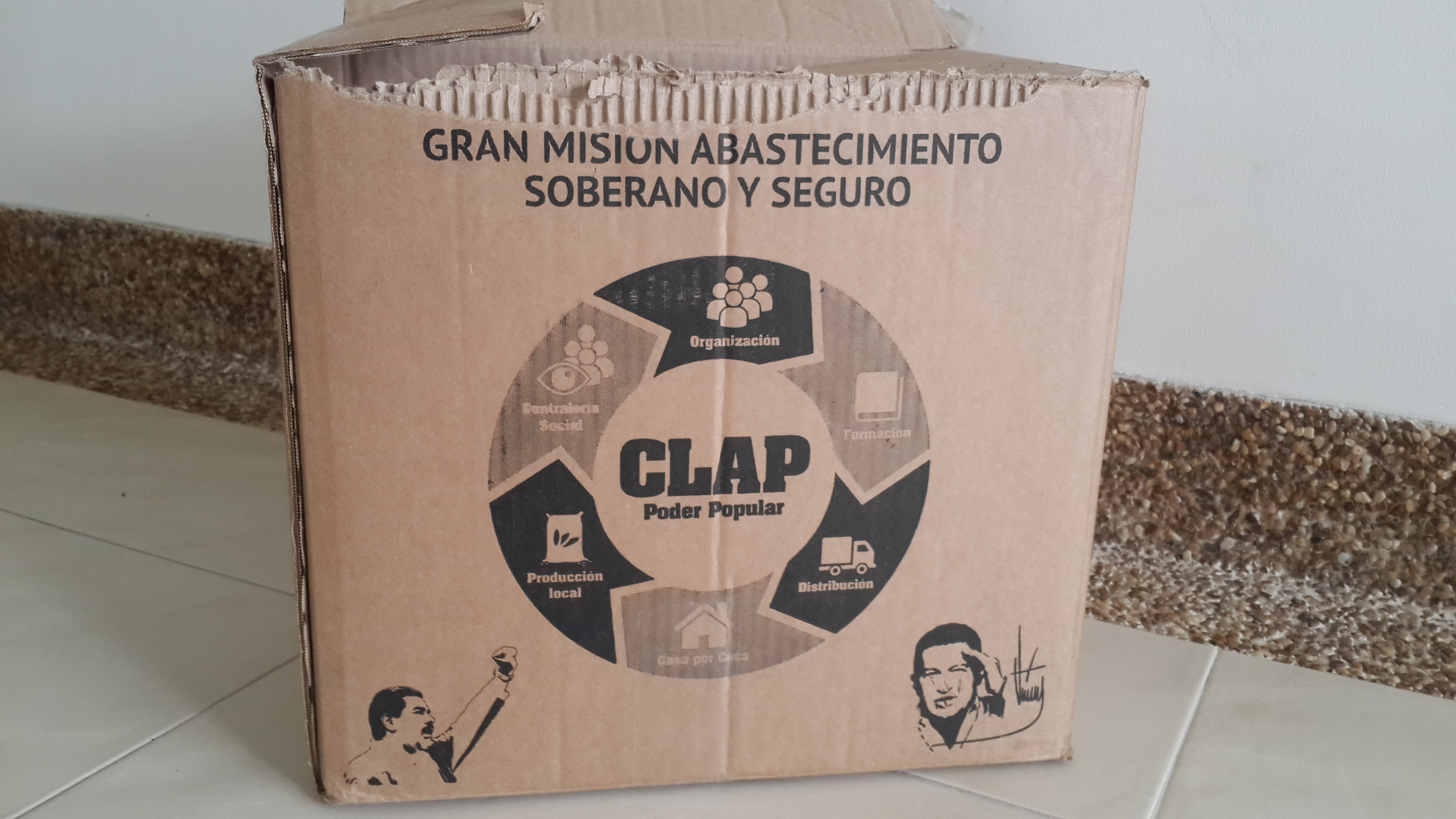
A food box provided by CLAP, with the supplier receiving government funds owned by President Maduro

On 25 July 2019, the U.S. Treasury Department sanctioned 13 companies (from Colombia, Hong Kong (China), Mexico, Panama, Turkey, the United Arab Emirates and the U.S.) involved in a Venezuelan food subsidy program called CLAP, along with 10 people including Maduro's stepsons and Colombian businessman Alex Saab. Saab sold food to Venezuela for more than USD 200 million in a negotiation signed by Maduro through a company registered in Hong Kong. On 23 August 2017, the Venezuelan attorney general, Luisa Ortega Díaz, had named Saab as the owner of the Mexican firm Group Grand Limited, along with Colombian businessmen Álvaro Pulido and Rodolfo Reyes, and "presumably President Nicolás Maduro" that sold food to the CLAP.

According to Mnuchin, corruption in the "CLAP program has allowed Maduro and his family members to steal from the Venezuelan people" by using "food as a form of social control, to reward political supporters and punish opponents, all the while pocketing hundreds of millions of dollars through a number of fraudulent schemes." Saab and another Colombian businessman were charged in the U.S. with money laundering related to a 2011–2015 scheme to pay bribes to take advantage of Venezuela's government-set exchange rate.

After a multilateral meeting between over a dozen European and Latin American countries, U.S. Treasury Department officials had stated in April 2018 that they had collaborated with Colombian officials to investigate corrupt import programs of the Maduro administration including CLAP. They stated that Venezuelan officials pocketed 70% of the proceeds allocated for importation programs destined to alleviate hunger in Venezuela. Treasury officials said they sought to seize the proceeds that were being funneled into the accounts of Venezuelan officials and hold them for a future government in Venezuela.

An April 2019 communication from the U.S. State Department highlighted the 2017 National Assembly investigation finding that the government paid US$42 for food boxes that cost under US$13, and that "Maduro's inner circle kept the difference, which totaled more than $200 million dollars in at least one case", adding that food boxes were "distributed in exchange for votes". On 17 September 2019, the U.S. Treasury Department expanded further sanctions on 16 entities (from Colombia, Italy and Panama) and 3 individuals, accusing them of helping the Venezuelan government profit from food import and distribution.

=== Airline and aircraft ===
The U.S. sanctioned 15 PDVSA aircraft on 21 January 2020, stating that they had "been involved in the harassment of U.S. military flights in Caribbean airspace", and had been used to provide transport to sanctioned individuals.

Venezuela's state airline Conviasa (Consorcio Venezolano de Industrias Aeronáuticas y Servicios Aéreos) was blocked under Executive Order 13884 of 5 August 2019 that applied generally to property of the Government of Venezuela, but OFAC explicitly identified it and its fleet of 40 aircraft on the Specially Designated Nationals (SDN) list on 7 February 2020 to assure compliance.

The Biden Administration began relaxing sanctions on Conviasa in October 2023 under General License 45 for the purpose of deporting Venezuelan nationals from the U.S. General License 45A, issued in November 2023, further eased restrictions on Conviasa, allowing for maintenance of certain Embraer aircraft and was replaced by General License 45B on 29 February 2024, to allow for Venezuelans from non-U.S. jurisdictions to be repatriated.

In November 2023, the U.S. Bureau of Industry and Security named three companies that it said had circumvented sanctions by smuggling U.S. aviation parts to Venezuela.

With the relaxing of restrictions under the Biden Administration, 55 aircraft registered in Venezuela remain sanctioned as of November 2023.

On 2 September 2024, the U.S. seized Maduro's presidential airplane, a Dassault Falcon 900, from the Dominican Republic and flew it to Florida to proceed with a forteiture. Merrick Garland, the U.S. Attorney General, alleged that the purchase of the plane violated U.S. sanctions, stating that it "was illegally purchased for $13 million through a shell company and smuggled out of the United States for use by Nicolás Maduro and his cronies". Maduro called the seizure a "criminal practice" and "piracy".

== Evasion ==
Minister of Industries and National Production Tareck El Aissami announced in October 2018 in response to U.S. sanctions that all foreign exchange government auctions would be quoted in euros, Chinese yuan and other hard currencies instead of U.S. dollars. He said the government would open bank accounts in Europe and Asia as potential workarounds to financial sanctions and that Venezuela's banking sector would be able to participate in currency auctions three times a week, adding that the government would sell some 2 billion euros amid a rebound in oil prices.

Some ships' captains and owners sympathetic to Venezuela turned off their transponder locations to avoid the U.S. sanctions and deliver oil to Russia, China, and India, creating an environmental risk of ship collisions. As of 2020, Mexico defied the U.S. sanctions by allowing fuel shipments, and in spite of sanctions on both Iran and Venezuela, Iran sent five oil tankers to Venezuela.

Venezuela continued to send money and ship petroleum products to ally countries after sanctions were issued. In April 2022, it sent fuel oil and diesel to Cuba, and paid Saint Vincent and the Grenadines' debt with Petrocaribe, estimated to have been around $189 million. In August 2023, Petróleos de Venezuela increased fuel shipments to Cuba, from 53,000 barrels per day of petroleum products to 65,000 barrels.

Following an investigation by the F.B.I. of trading involving Mexican companies, in January 2021, the U.S. sanctioned a network comprising three people, fourteen companies and six ships for evading sanctions on Venezuelan petroleum products; the individuals, shipping crude mainly to Asia, were Alessandro Bazzoni, Francisco D'Agostino and Philipp Apikian; the companies were Elemento Ltd and Swissoil Trading SA, and other companies owned by the three individuals. Maduro government officials called the sanctions a "new, desperate aggression" by Trump, and stated that the "revolutionary government [was] still standing today". Six months earlier, three Mexicans, eight Mexican-based companies and two ships were sanctioned; the individuals were Olga Maria Zepeda, Veronica Esparza and Joaquin Leal Jimenez and the companies were Libre Abordo and Schlager Business Group, and others owned by Zepeda or Leal. The companies received at least 30 million barrels of crude. A Libre Abordo spokesperson told Reuters they were exchanging crude for humanitarian aid and should not have been sanctioned; Reuters reported the food in exchange for crude was never delivered. Arreaza stated that the U.S. wanted to see that the "Venezuelan people are left without food, medicine or gasoline".

== See also ==
- Persons sanctioned during Venezuelan crisis
- Entities sanctioned during Venezuelan crisis
- Cartel of the Suns
- United States embargoes
