= Caryslia Rodríguez =

Venezuelan judge and politician (born 1960)

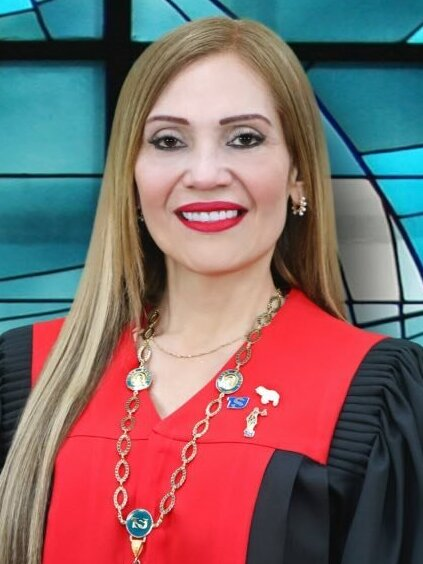
- Official portrait, 2025

President of the Supreme Tribunal of Justice of Venezuela
- Incumbent
- Assumed office 17 January 2024
- Preceded by: Gladys Gutiérrez

Justice of the Supreme Tribunal of Justice
- Incumbent
- Assumed office 26 April 2022
- Appointed by: National Assembly

Acting Mayor of Libertador Municipality
- In office 27 August 2021 – 21 November 2021
- Preceded by: Erika Farías
- Succeeded by: Carmen Meléndez

Councillor of Libertador Municipality
- In office 21 November 2021 – 26 April 2022
- In office 20 January 2019 – 27 August 2021

Personal details
- Born: Caryslia Beatriz Rodríguez Rodríguez; 1960 (age 65–66) Aragua, Venezuela
- Party: United Socialist Party of Venezuela (PSUV) (from 2007); Fifth Republic Movement (until 2007)
- Education: Central University of Venezuela
- Occupation: Politician

Caryslia Beatriz Rodríguez Rodríguez (born 1960) is a Venezuelan attorney, politician and judge who was named by Nicolás Maduro as president of Venezuela's Supreme Tribunal of Justice (TSJ) in January 2024, while also serving as a judge in the Electoral Chamber of the high court. A member of the United Socialist Party of Venezuela (PSUV), she previously served as the acting mayor of Caracas, and was counselor for the government and headed the Municipal Chamber of Caracas.

== Education ==
Rodríguez attended primary and secondary school in Maracay. She graduated in 1993 from the Central University of Venezuela, where she was a friend of Cilia Flores, Maduro's wife. She obtained a master's degree in military criminal law and was pursuing a doctorate as of 2024 from the University of Nueva Esparta.

== Career and politics ==
Beginning in June 2014, Rodríguez was a legal consultant to IPOSTEL, the Postal Telegraph Institute of Venezuela. She also worked for the Venezuelan Transmission Network.

Rodríguez joined the Fifth Republic Movement, started by Hugo Chávez, in the 1990s, and founded its women's board. Active in municipal politics representing the United Socialist Party of Venezuela (PSUV) in Caracas from 2018, Delcy Rodríguez appointed her to a substitute board position in Caracas metropolitan management. As an active member of PSUV through 2021, she served with PSUV support as the acting mayor of Caracas between August and November 2021, and was elected in 2018 councilor as a PSUV representative for the government and headed the Municipal Chamber. She was a candidate in the 2021 PSUV primaries. According to Infobae, Rodríguez once "described herself as a woman committed to the revolution, loyal to Commander Hugo Chávez and President Nicolás Maduro".

== Supreme Tribunal of Justice ==
On 26 April 2022, Rodríguez was named a judge to the Electoral Chamber of the TSJ by the National Assembly of Venezuela, "which is aligned with the Nicolás Maduro regime", according to El Diario de Caracas, where she was immediately made president.

Ruling number 122 from that Electoral Chamber annulled the 2023 Unitary Platform presidential primaries, which were won by María Corina Machado.

On 17 January 2024, she was elevated to president of the TSJ, replacing Gladys Gutiérrez. Infobae wrote that "In the judicial field, despite her limited previous experience, her appointment to the Electoral Chamber and subsequent presidency of the TSJ have been seen by some as an extension of Nicolás Maduro's influence in the judicial branch."

=== 2024 presidential election ===
After the 2024 Venezuelan presidential election, a 6 August article in The New York Times stated that the National Electoral Council (CNE) declaration that Maduro won "plunged Venezuela into a political crisis ... and provoked global denunciation." Maduro did not acknowledge the results which showed him losing the election, and instead asked the TSJ on 1 August to audit and approve the results. One of the candidates, Enrique Márquez, called for Rodríguez to recuse because of her connections to Maduro, his party and his administration, noting "her political ties with the ruling party".

On 22 August, as anticipated, after reviewing materials submitted, the TSJ, composed of justices loyal to Maduro, validated the CNE's statements of a win by Maduro in a statement read by Rodríguez. The court stated that the opposition vote tallies were falsified; the Associated Press wrote that the Maduro administration "has claimed—without evidence—that a foreign cyberattack staged by hackers from North Macedonia delayed the vote counting on election night and publication of the disaggregated results." Jorge Rodríguez, National Assembly president, claimed that the opposition vote tallies had been forged.

In announcing the TSJ decision, Rodríguez said that a criminal investigation would be conducted regarding "presumably false" results that were published.

Following the TSJ ruling, Márquez said he would ask the Constitutional Chamber of the high court to review the decision.

=== Sanctions ===
On 12 September 2024, the U.S. sanctioned 16 individuals for their involvement in the 2024 Venezuelan presidential election, including Rodríguez.

== See also ==
- Indira Alfonzo
- Gladys Gutiérrez
- Jhannett Madriz
