= Oblitas =

Oblitas is a Spanish surname. Notable people with the surname include:

- Bernardo José Pérez de Oblitas (1707-1760), Bolivian bishop
- Jorge Oblitas (1831–1900), Bolivian politician
- Juan Carlos Oblitas (born 1951), Peruvian footballer
- Sandra Oblitas Ruzza (born 1969), Venezuelan public official
