= Socorro Elizabeth Hernández =

Venezuelan electoral official

Socorro Elizabeth Hernández de Hernández (born 11 March 1952) is a Venezuelan rector of the country's National Electoral Council (CNE). Before the 2017 Venezuelan Constituent Assembly elections, she was involved in changes to polling stations.

== CNE appointment ==
After the 2017 Venezuelan Constituent Assembly election, Hernández was named to the CNE for a term covering 2016–2022 by the Venezuelan Supreme Tribunal of Justice, although the Constitution of Venezuela calls for CNE officials to be named by the National Assembly.

== International sanctions ==
Hernández has been sanctioned by several countries.

Canada sanctioned 40 Venezuelan officials, including Hernández, in September 2017. The sanctions were for behaviors that undermined democracy after at least 125 people will killed in the 2017 Venezuelan protests and "in response to the government of Venezuela's deepening descent into dictatorship". Canadians were banned from transactions with the 40 individuals, whose Canadian assets were frozen.

In November, ten government officials, including Hernández, were added to the list of Venezuelans sanctioned by the United States after the 2017 Venezuelan Constituent Assembly election; the Treasury Department described the individuals as being "associated with undermining electoral processes, media censorship, or corruption in government-administered food programs in Venezuela".

In March 2018, Panama sanctioned 55 public officials, including Hernández, and Switzerland implemented sanctions, freezing the assets of eleven Venezuelans, including Hernández, in July 2018.

In June 2018, the European Union sanctioned eleven officials, including Hernández, in response to the May 2018 Venezuelan presidential election, which the E.U. described as "neither free nor fair", stating that "their outcome lacked any credibility as the electoral process did not ensure the necessary guarantees for them to be inclusive and democratic".

== See also ==
- Gladys Gutiérrez
- Indira Alfonzo
- Jorge Rodríguez
- Sandra Oblitas Ruzza
- Tibisay Lucena
