= Gladys Gutiérrez =

Venezuelan judge (born 1962)

President of the Supreme Tribunal of Justice of Venezuela
- In office 27 April 2022 – 17 January 2024
- Preceded by: Maikel Moreno
- Succeeded by: Caryslia Rodríguez
- In office May 2013 – 24 February 2017
- Preceded by: Luisa Estella Morales
- Succeeded by: Maikel Moreno

Ambassador of Venezuela to Spain
- In office 5 April 2024 – 16 June 2026
- President: Nicolás Maduro; Delcy Rodríguez (acting)
- Preceded by: Coromoto Godoy
- Succeeded by: Timoteo Zambrano
- In office 2003–2005
- President: Hugo Chávez

Justice of the Supreme Tribunal of Justice
- In office 26 April 2022 – 17 January 2024
- Appointed by: National Assembly
- In office 2010–2020
- Appointed by: National Assembly
- Preceded by: Pedro Rondón Haaz
- Succeeded by: Rene Degraves Almarza

Principal Rector of the National Electoral Council
- In office 12 June 2020 – 4 May 2021
- Appointed by: National Constituent Assembly
- Preceded by: Socorro Hernández
- Succeeded by: Alexis Corredor

Solicitor General of the Republic
- In office 2006–2011
- Appointed by: National Assembly
- Preceded by: Marisol Plaza Irigoyen
- Succeeded by: Margarita Mendola Sánchez

Personal details
- Born: Gladys María Gutiérrez Alvarado; April 16, 1962 (age 64) Punto Fijo, Falcón, Venezuela
- Party: PSUV (2007–2010)
- Other political affiliations: Fifth Republic Movement (1998–2007)
- Education: Central University of Venezuela
- Occupation: Judge

Gladys María Gutiérrez Alvarado (born 16 April 1962) is a Venezuelan lawyer and judge who served as President of the Supreme Tribunal of Justice from 2013 to 2017 and again from 2022 to 2024.

== Career and education ==
Gutierrez studied law at the Universidad Central de Venezuela. She became member of the Constitutional Court on 9 December 2010.

She was a member of the Fifth Republic Movement, a party that supported Hugo Chávez. She ran for governor of Nueva Esparta as a member of that party in 1998 but lost.

In 2003 the central government named Gutiérrez ambassador to Spain. She was also general consul of Venezuela in Spain and director of the Office for the Ministers' Council.

From 2006 until 2011, she performed as Head Public Prosecutor of the Republic for former President Hugo Chávez.

Gutiérrez has taught law at the Universidad Santiago Mariño and the Instituto Universitario de Tecnología Rodolfo Loero Arismendi.

== Head of Supreme Court ==
Gutiérrez became president of the Supreme Court in May 2013. Her election was contested by the opposition.

In August 2013 she led the court that dismissed Henrique Capriles' election appeal. Capriles had claimed the audit was a fake and did not correspond with the audit of actual ballots.

Gutiérrez presided the trial that sentenced mayor Vicencio Scarano Spisso to 10.5 months in jail for insubordination.

On 17 January 2024, she was replaced as president of the Supreme Court by Caryslia Rodríguez.

== Sanctions ==
Gutiérrez was sanctioned by several countries.

The U.S. Treasury Department sanctioned Gutiérrez and seven members of the Venezuelan Supreme Justice Tribunal (TSJ) in May 2017 for usurping the functions of the Venezuelan National Assembly and permitting Maduro to govern by decree. The U.S. assets of the eight individuals were frozen, and U.S. persons prohibited from doing business with them.

Canada sanctioned 40 Venezuelan officials, including Gutiérrez, in September 2017. The sanctions were for behaviors that undermined democracy after at least 125 people were killed in the 2017 Venezuelan protests and "in response to the government of Venezuela's deepening descent into dictatorship". Canadians were banned from transactions with the 40 individuals, whose Canadian assets were frozen.

On 29 March 2018, Gutiérrez was sanctioned by the Panamanian government for her alleged involvement with "money laundering, financing of terrorism and financing the proliferation of weapons of mass destruction".

== See also ==
- Indira Alfonzo
- Jorge Rodríguez
- Sandra Oblitas Ruzza
- Socorro Elizabeth Hernández
- Tibisay Lucena
