= Sandra Oblitas Ruzza =

Venezuelan electoral official

Sandra Oblitas Ruzza (born 7 June 1969) is a Venezuelan public official who has been vice president and rector of the country's National Electoral Council (CNE). She was involved in disruptions during the 2017 Venezuelan Constituent Assembly elections in Venezuela.

Oblitas graduated from the Central University of Venezuela in sociology. She worked as an assistant at CNE beginning in 2003.

== International sanctions ==
Hernández has been sanctioned by several countries.

Canada sanctioned 40 Venezuelan officials, including Oblitas, in September 2017. The sanctions were for behaviors that undermined democracy after at least 125 people will killed in the 2017 Venezuelan protests and "in response to the government of Venezuela's deepening descent into dictatorship". Canadians were banned from transactions with the 40 individuals, whose Canadian assets were frozen.

In November, ten government officials, including Oblitas, were added to the list of Venezuelans sanctioned by the United States after the 2017 Venezuelan Constituent Assembly election; the Treasury Department described the individuals as being "associated with undermining electoral processes, media censorship, or corruption in government-administered food programs in Venezuela".

In March 2018, Panama sanctioned 55 public officials, including Oblitas.

In June 2018, the European Union sanctioned eleven officials, including Oblitas, in response to the May 2018 Venezuelan presidential election, which the E.U. described as "neither free nor fair", stating that "their outcome lacked any credibility as the electoral process did not ensure the necessary guarantees for them to be inclusive and democratic".

On 10 July 2018, Sandra Oblitas Ruzza, among eleven Venezuelans previously sanctioned by the European Union in June 2018, was added to the sanctions list of Switzerland.

== See also ==
- Gladys Gutiérrez
- Indira Alfonzo
- Jorge Rodríguez
- Socorro Elizabeth Hernández
- Tibisay Lucena
