= Luisa Estella Morales =

Venezuelan jurist (born 1945)

Chief Justice of the Supreme Tribunal of Justice
- In office 7 March 2007 – May 2013
- Preceded by: Omar Mora Diaz
- Succeeded by: Gladys Gutiérrez

Personal details
- Born: 1 October 1945 (age 80) Venezuela
- Education: University of Carabobo

Luisa Estella Morales Lamuño (born 1 October 1945) is a Venezuelan jurist who is a member and former chief justice of the Supreme Tribunal of Justice, Venezuela's highest court of law.

== Education and appointment ==
Morales Lamuño studied law at the University of Carabobo. She was appointed to the Supreme Tribunal by the National Assembly on December 13, 2004 for a period of 12 years. Appointed by majority 29 of 32 votes from the Plenary of the Supreme Tribunal, President of the high court on February 7, 2007 and ratified for the position for 2009-2011 and 2011-2013.

== Postponing Chavez’s inauguration ==
On January 9, 2013 Morales Lamuño appeared on national television to read the decision of the Venezuelan Supreme Tribunal, ruling that President Hugo Chávez's inauguration could be postponed. The court also ruled that in the meantime, Chavez's handpicked vice president, Nicolás Maduro, should run the government.

On December 20, 2012 Morales Lamuño had told the media: "Given the situation--not the new president, because he is not new, it’s the same president and this is a very important fact, which is the continuity arising from the reelection of the president--the Constitutional Court of course will expect any matter that has to do with its competence to be presented and answer to it promptly."

The judgment started wide debate on the legitimacy of Venezuelan government after January 10, 2013. While the official position insists on the continuity of the mandate, political opposition states the ruling was clearly unconstitutional.

== Code of Ethics of the Judge ==
On May 7, 2012, the last day Estella Morales was in charge of the presidency of the Supreme Tribunal, the court ruled a sentence (Nr. 516) that dismantles judicial disciplinary jurisdiction (the instances of investigation, prosecution and punishment of wrongdoing by judges in the exercise of their duties) and opens the possibility of a flood of claims by judges dismissed under the former Code of Ethics of the Judge.

== Personal life ==
Luisa Estella Morales Lamuño is widowed (her husband died June 2012). Their daughter Leticia Morales Acosta was a legal consultant to the Executive Directorate of the Judiciary.
