= Indira Alfonzo =

President of the national electoral council of venezuela

Indira Maira Alfonzo Izaguirre (born 29 April 1968, in La Guaira, Venezuela) is a Venezuelan judge who until May 2020 served as the first vice president of the Supreme Tribunal of Justice of Venezuela (TSJ) and as president of the Electoral Chamber. In June 2020, she sworn in as chief rector and president of the National Electoral Council (CNE) by the TSJ, to organize 2020 Venezuelan parliamentary election. Her position in the CNE is contested by the National Assembly, organism in charge of selecting the CNE members, but the parliament was deemed in “unconstitutional omission” by the TSJ.

== Magistrate of the Supreme Tribunal of Justice ==
Being the president of the Electoral Chamber, Alfonzo presided over and drafted the sentence in which the possession of the deputies of the Amazonas state was suspended a few days after the 2015 parliamentary elections were held, leaving the state without representation in the National Assembly to the coalition opponent of the Democratic Unity Roundtable (MUD) without a qualified two-thirds majority, as well as the sentence that suspended the 2018 Carabobo University student elections, ordering the university authorities to proclaim the student candidate for government, Jessica Bello, in place of Marlon Díaz, who had already been proclaimed and sworn in after having obtained 82.6% of the votes.

== Sanctions ==
Responding to the May 2018 Venezuelan presidential election, Canada sanctioned 14 Venezuelans, including Alfonzo, stating that the "economic, political and humanitarian crisis in Venezuela has continued to worsen as it moves ever closer to full dictatorship." The government said the 2018 presidential election was "illegitimate and anti-democratic", and sanctioned Alfonzo, along with 13 other members of the ANC and TSJ.

The United States sanctioned Alfonzo and three others on 4 September 2020, accusing them of facilitating the Maduro government's efforts to undermine the independence and democratic order of Venezuela. According to Treasury Secretary Steven Mnuchin, he said that "the corrupt Maduro regime is attempting to seize control of the National Assembly of Venezuela through a fraudulent election.” The sanctions were announced as the country prepares the National Assembly elections on 6 December, which opposition parties consider it fraudulent and announced their boycott.

On February 22, 2021, the EU imposed personal restrictions on her due to her role in undermining democracy and rule of law in Venezuela.

== See also ==
- Gladys Gutiérrez
- Jorge Rodríguez
- Sandra Oblitas Ruzza
- Socorro Elizabeth Hernández
- Tibisay Lucena
