= Tibisay Lucena =

Venezuelan politician (1959–2023)

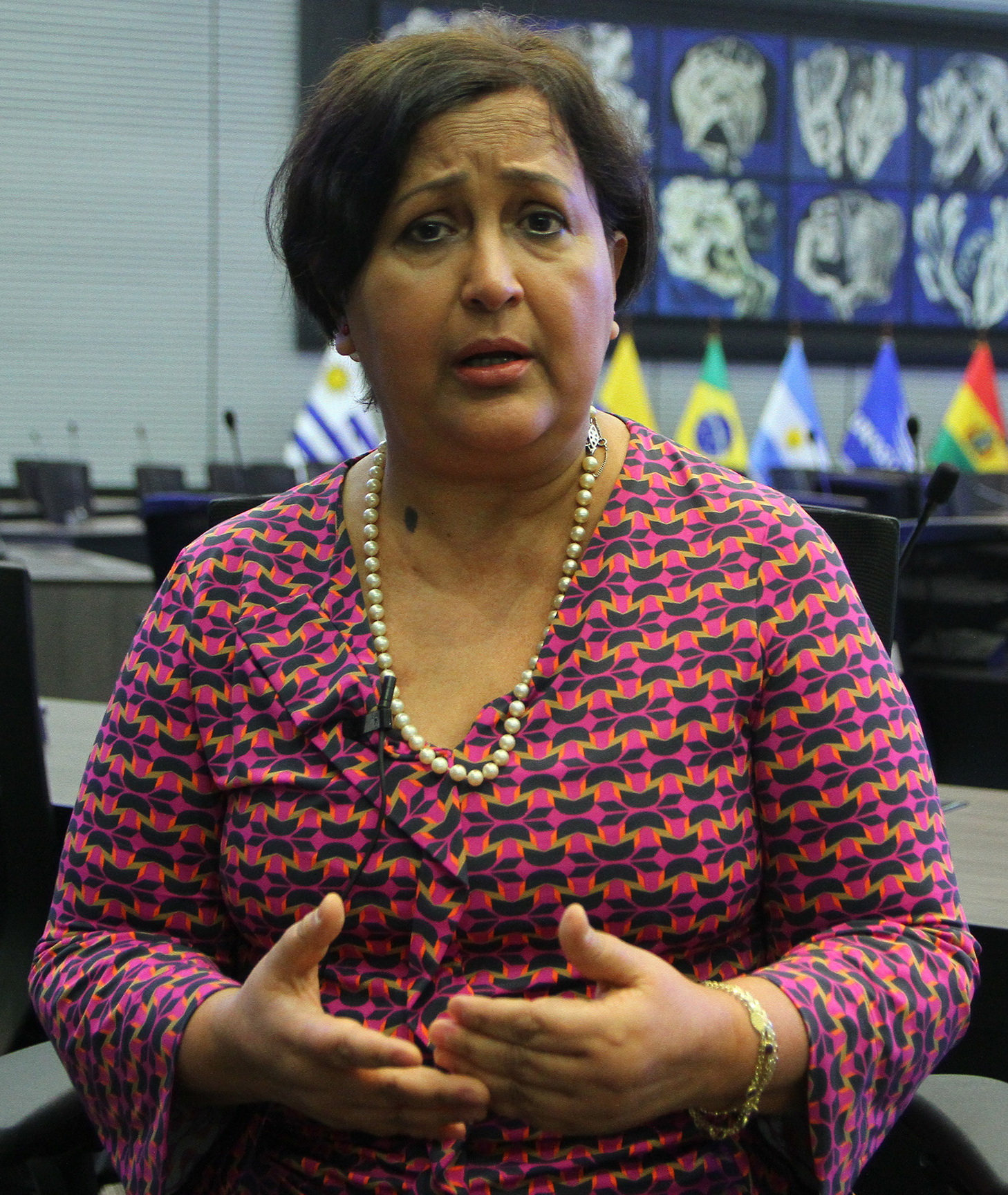
- Lucena in 2015

Minister of University Education
- In office 19 October 2021 – 12 April 2023
- President: Nicolás Maduro
- Preceded by: César Trómpiz
- Succeeded by: Sandra Oblitas Ruzza

President of the National Electoral Council of Venezuela
- In office 30 April 2006 – 12 June 2020
- Preceded by: Jorge Rodríguez Gómez
- Succeeded by: Indira Alfonzo Izaguirre

Personal details
- Born: Tibisay Lucena Ramírez; 26 April 1959 Barquisimeto, Lara, Venezuela
- Died: 12 April 2023 (aged 63) Caracas, Venezuela

Tibisay Lucena Ramírez (26 April 1959 – 12 April 2023) was a Venezuelan politician, president of the National Electoral Council (CNE) between 2006 and 2020, one of the five branches of government of Venezuela. Since 2017, Lucena was sanctioned by several countries for her role in undermining democracy and human rights in the country.

== Early life and education ==
Tibisay Lucena Ramírez was born in Barquisimeto on April 26, 1959. She studied cello and performed with Venezuela's National Youth Orchestra and Simón Bolívar Symphony Orchestra (1980–87). Lucena earned a B.A. in sociology from the Central University of Venezuela and worked as a researcher at the Institute of Advanced Studies of Administration. She then pursued graduate studies in the United States, earning an M.A. in sociology from the New School for Social Research in New York.

== Career ==
In December 1999, during the transitional regime of the public branches, she was appointed by the National Constituent Assembly as alternate rector of the Venezuelan National Electoral Council (CNE). She was first elected as CNE president in 2006, and was reelected in 2009 for the 2009-2013 period.

During the 2006 presidential elections, around 5 p.m., Lucena officially announced the end of the voting process, but gave orders to keep polling stations open if voters still remained in line. She would later declare Hugo Chávez as winner of the elections against Manuel Rosales at 10 p.m. During the 2013 presidential elections, Tibisay rejected the audit requested by opposition candidate Henrique Capriles after declaring he was defeating, saying that it was "impossible to carry out the audit in the terms proposed."

Her position was slated to expire on 30 April 2013; however, she did not leave the post until October 2014 when the National Assembly swore in the Nominating Committee to appoint her replacement and that of two of her other colleagues, because the parliament could not reach an agreement with the majority required by law, so it proceeded to an appointment authorized by the Supreme Tribunal of Justice.

On 26 December 2014 she was reelected as the CNE's chief rector by designation of the Supreme Tribunal of Justice, after the request for a declaration of omission of the National Assembly made by Diosdado Cabello, as president of the National Assembly, was admitted. On 23 May 2017, Tibisay officially approved President Nicolás Maduro's proposal for a Constituent Assembly shortly after Supreme Tribunal justices began to speak out against the proposal, announcing that the internal elections would be held in late-July on an unspecified date, paving a way to replace Hugo Chávez's 1999 constitution. During the 2018 presidential elections, Lucena announced that the political parties and individuals that promoted abstention would be sanctioned. She would later declare Nicolás Maduro as the winner of the elections.

On 12 June 2020, the Supreme Tribunal of Justice of Venezuela appointed attorney Indira Alfonzo as the new president of CNE, ending Lucena's tenure. Lucena was considered to be pro-PSUV by the opposition, despite that the position she held must be exercised with neutrality.

On 7 September 2020, the University Education Ministry swore her in as rector of the Universidad Nacional Experimental de las Artes. On 19 October 2021 she was appointed the new Minister of University Education.

== Sanctions ==
Lucena was sanctioned by several countries and was banned from entering neighboring Colombia. The Colombian government maintains a list of people banned from entering Colombia or subject to expulsion. As of January 2019, the list had 200 people with a "close relationship and support for the Nicolás Maduro regime". In July 2017, thirteen senior officials, including Lucena, of the Venezuelan government associated with the 2017 Venezuelan Constituent Assembly elections were sanctioned by the United States for their role in undermining democracy and human rights. Canada sanctioned 40 Venezuelan officials, including Lucena, in September 2017. The sanctions were for behaviors that undermined democracy after at least 125 people were killed in the 2017 Venezuelan protests and "in response to the government of Venezuela's deepening descent into dictatorship". Canadians were banned from transactions with the 40 individuals, whose Canadian assets were frozen. The European Union sanctioned seven Venezuela officials, including Lucena, on 18 January 2018, singling them out as being responsible for deteriorating democracy in the country. The sanctioned individuals were prohibited from entering the nations of the European Union, and their assets were frozen. On 29 March 2018, Panama sanctioned 55 public officials, including Lucena, and Switzerland implemented sanctions, freezing the assets of seven ministers and high officials, including Lucena, due to human rights violations and deteriorating rule of law and democracy. On 20 April 2018, the Mexican Senate froze the assets of officials of the Maduro administration, including Lucena, and prohibited them from entering Mexico.

== Later life and death ==
Lucena had surgery performed in 2011 on suspicion of ovarian damage, and was known to have a malignant tumor in her pelvic region for at least the last 10 years of her life. She died on 12 April 2023, at the age of 63.

== See also ==
- Gladys Gutiérrez
- Indira Alfonzo
- Jorge Rodríguez
- Sandra Oblitas Ruzza
- Socorro Elizabeth Hernández
- Elections in Venezuela
