= 2017 Venezuelan Constituent Assembly election =

- 30 July 2017

All 538 seats in the Constituent National Assembly 270 seats needed for a majority
- Registered: 19,477,387
- Turnout: 41.53% (CNE); 12.75% (independent estimates)
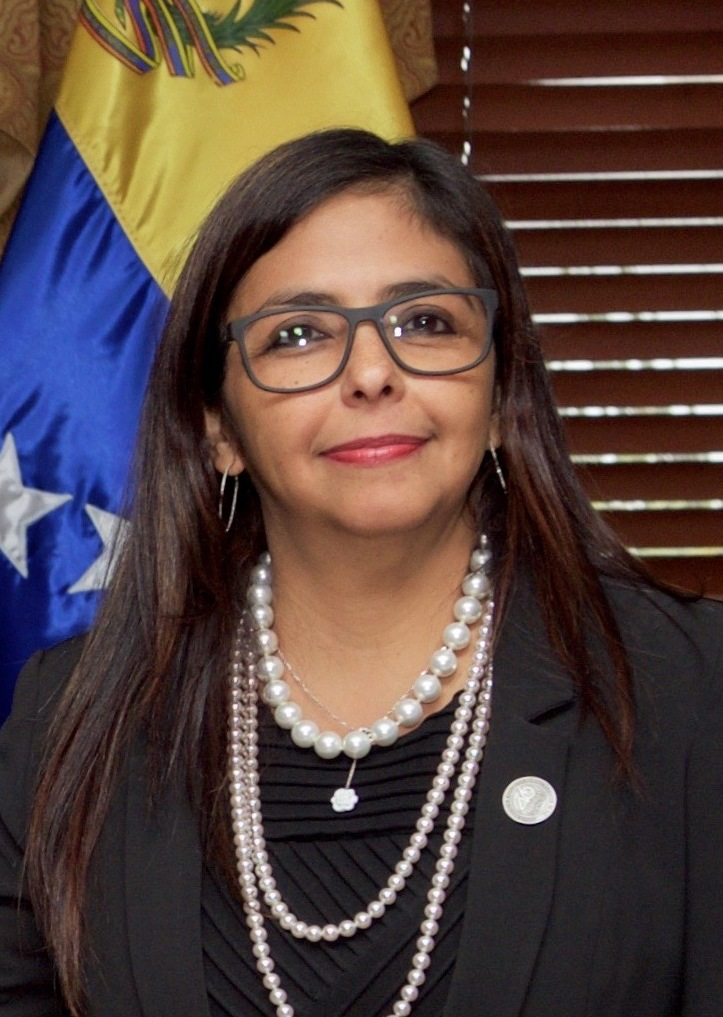
	Majority party
Candidate	Delcy Rodriguez
Party	PSUV
Alliance	GPPSB
Seats won	538
Seat change	▲538
Popular vote	8,089,230
Percentage	100%
Elected President of the Constituent Assembly
Delcy Rodríguez
PSUV/MSV

Constituent Assembly elections were held in Venezuela on 30 July 2017 to elect the members of the 2017 Constituent National Assembly (Spanish: Asamblea Nacional Constituyente; ANC). Unlike the 1999 Constituent National Assembly, which was assembled following a referendum, the 2017 election was convened by the presidential decree of President Nicolás Maduro. Smartmatic, the company which provided the voting machines, stated that the results were tampered with by the CNE, and that the turnout was off by at least one million votes.

Approximately two-thirds (364) of Assembly members were elected by municipal citizens while members of seven social sectors — including trade unions, communal councils, indigenous groups, farmers, students, and pensioners — elected the remaining one-third (181) of members. The opposition's boycott of the election meant that most candidates of the Constituent Assembly were supporters of the government.

The decision to hold the election was criticised by members of the international community. Over 40 countries along with supranational bodies, such as the European Union, Mercosur and the Organization of American States, condemned and failed to recognize the election, stating it would only further escalate tensions. Nicolás Maduro's allies — such as Bolivia, Cuba, Ecuador, Nicaragua, Russia, and Syria — discouraged foreign interference in Venezuelan politics and congratulated Maduro.

== Background ==
Following the death of former President Hugo Chávez, citizens suffered under a socioeconomic crisis under his successor, Nicolás Maduro, as rampant crime, hyperinflation and shortages diminished their quality of life. As a result of the ensuing crisis, political tensions culminated into a series of protests that occurred since 2014. As a result of discontent with the Bolivarian government, for the first time since 1999, the opposition was elected to hold the majority in the National Assembly following the 2015 parliamentary election.

=== 2017 Venezuelan constitutional crisis ===
Following the 2015 National Assembly election, the lame duck National Assembly (consisting of Bolivarian officials) filled the Supreme Tribunal of Justice (TSJ) with allies. The TSJ quickly stripped three opposition lawmakers of their seats in early 2016, citing alleged "irregularities" in elections, preventing an opposition supermajority in the National Assembly which would have been able to challenge President Maduro. The TSJ court then began to approve of multiple actions performed by Maduro and granted him more powers. In July 2016, the opposition walked out of Vatican-mediated dialogue between the Bolivarian government and the opposition, due to lack of progress towards releasing political prisoners or allowing a recall election; the opposition stated "We'll only sit down with the government again once they meet what was agreed on."

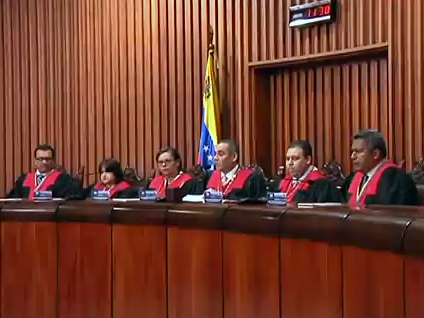
The Supreme Tribunal of Justice (TSJ) meeting on 28 March 2017.

In October 2016, a recall referendum against President Maduro was cancelled by the National Electoral Council (CNE). The following days after the recall movement was cancelled, 1.2 million Venezuelans protested throughout the country against the move and demanded President Maduro to leave office. Protests in Caracas remained relatively calm while protests in other states resulted in clashes between demonstrators and authorities, leaving one policeman dead, 120 injured and 147 arrested. That day, the opposition gave President Maduro a deadline of November 4, 2016 to hold elections, with opposition leader Henrique Capriles stating, "today we are giving a deadline to the government. I tell the coward who is in Miraflores ... that on November 3, the Venezuelan people are coming to Caracas because we are going to Miraflores". Days later, on November 1, 2016, then National Assembly President and opposition leader, Henry Ramos Allup, announced the cancellation of November 3 march to the Miraflores presidential palace, with Vatican-led dialogue between the opposition and the government beginning. By December 7, 2016, dialogue halted between the two parties. Two months later on January 13, 2017, the Vatican declined to send a scheduled envoy for Vatican-mediated dialogue, a decision attributed to Maduro's failure to honor previous commitments made during the previous Vatican-mediated dialogues between the government and opposition.

Since 2016 the TSJ had held the National Assembly to be in contempt of court for swearing in the three stripped legislators. On March 29, 2017, in a surprising move, the TSJ declared it was taking over the legislative powers of Assembly for "as long as the contempt situation persists". The Tribunal, mainly supporters of President Nicolás Maduro, also restricted the immunity granted to the Assembly's members, who mostly belonged to the opposition. The dissolution was termed as a "coup" by the opposition while the Organization of American States (OAS) termed the action as a "self-coup". The decision was condemned by some media outlets with analysts characterizing the move as a turn towards authoritarianism and one-man rule.

On April 1, 2017, the TSJ reversed its decision, thereby reinstating the powers of the National Assembly. Public dissatisfaction with the decision persisted however, with the strengthening of the protests that year "into the most combative since a wave of unrest in 2014" resulting from the crisis.

=== 2017 Venezuelan protests ===
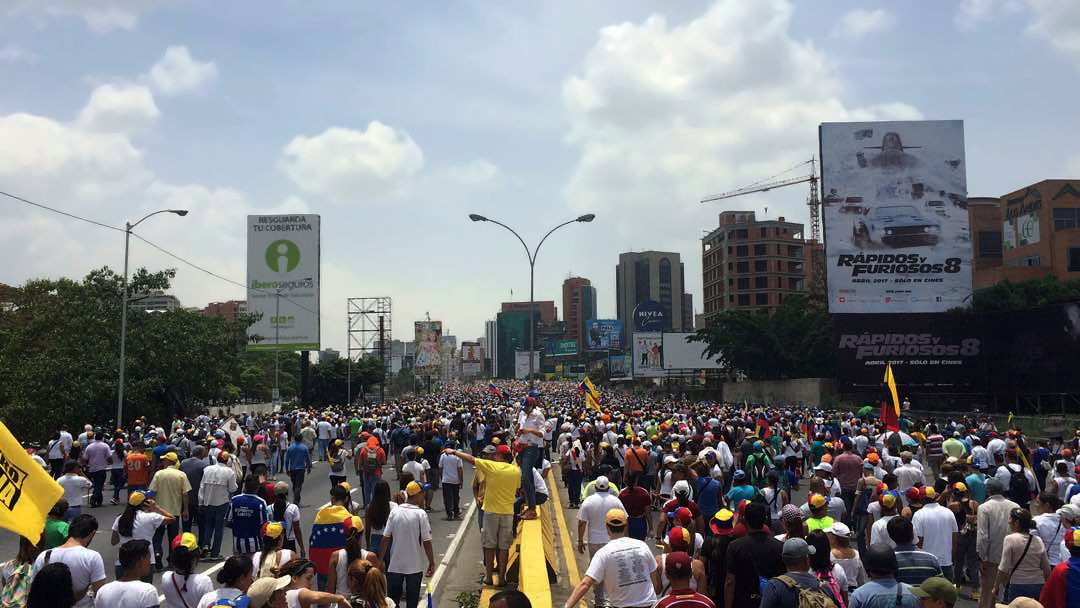
Millions of Venezuelans protesting during the Mother of All Marches

Following the reversal of the rulings by the TSJ, the National Assembly prepared proceeding against the court and accused the court of not being separated from the executive, though Reuters noted that "the move by the opposition-led congress would only be symbolic because it remains powerless". Following the criticism of the TSJ's ruling by Attorney General Ortega, calls for her to be involved in a "Republican Moral Council, made up of the Prosecutor's Office, the Office of the Comptroller and the Office of the Ombudsman" to remove members of the TSJ were made. During protests on 4 April, opposition leaders announced that they would pursue the removal of the seven judges who signed the rulings against the National Assembly.

On 7 April, Ombudsman Tarek William Saab announced that Attorney General Ortega's vote would not be counted in a Republican Moral Council decision on TSJ judges, stating that he and Comptroller Manuel Galindo would not participate in proceedings against the TSJ.

Protests continued on for a month into May 2017, claiming 29 lives before President Maduro made a constitutional proposal. As of June 16, 2017 there have been 90 people killed in protests, most of whom were students.

== Process ==
=== Proposal ===
Today, on May 1, I announce that I will use my presidential privileges as constitutional head of state in accordance with article 347, to convene the original constituent power so that the working class and the people can call a National Constituent Assembly.

— President Nicolás Maduro

On 1 May 2017 following a month of protests that resulted in at least 29 dead, President Maduro called for a constituent assembly that would draft a new constitution that would replace the 1999 Venezuela Constitution of his predecessor, Hugo Chávez. He invoked Article 347, and stated that his call for a new constitution was necessary to counter the actions of the opposition. Many countries consider that the election may be a bid by Maduro to stay in power indefinitely.

=== Approval ===
On 22 May, the Republican Moral Council – which the opposition hoped would establish proceedings against TSJ judges – shared their approval of the National Constituent Assembly despite the absence of Attorney General Ortega, who had criticized the move, with Ombudsman Tarek William Saab stating that "The call to the National Constituent Assembly is a constitutional exit to the political situation that the country is living, in order to foster dialogue and coexistence of the country".

Votes or bullets, what do the people want?

— President Nicolás Maduro, following the CNE's approval

The following day, the head of the National Electoral Council (CNE), Tibisay Lucena, officially approved President Maduro's proposal for a Constituent Assembly shortly after TSJ judges began to speak out against the proposal, announcing that the internal elections would be held in late-July on an unspecified date, paving a way to replace Hugo Chávez's 1999 constitution. Maduro later explained that the National Constituent Assembly would be composed of 545 members – 364 of which would be chosen by municipal governments and 181 drawn from workers groups (79), retirees (28), communal council members (24), students (24), peasantry (8), fishermen (8), the disabled (5) and businessmen (5).

The opposition has criticized the selection of representatives by municipal governments because municipal elections had been delayed until after constituents were chosen for the assembly – with each vote being a "secret vote".

=== Stages ===
According to the Venezuelan Electoral Observatory, the CNE ignored in their electoral schedule 14 auditions, several stages of the process and ignored 70 of 100 mandatory previous activities of any election contemplated in the Organic Law of Electoral Processes (Lopre in Spanish).

=== Campaigning ===
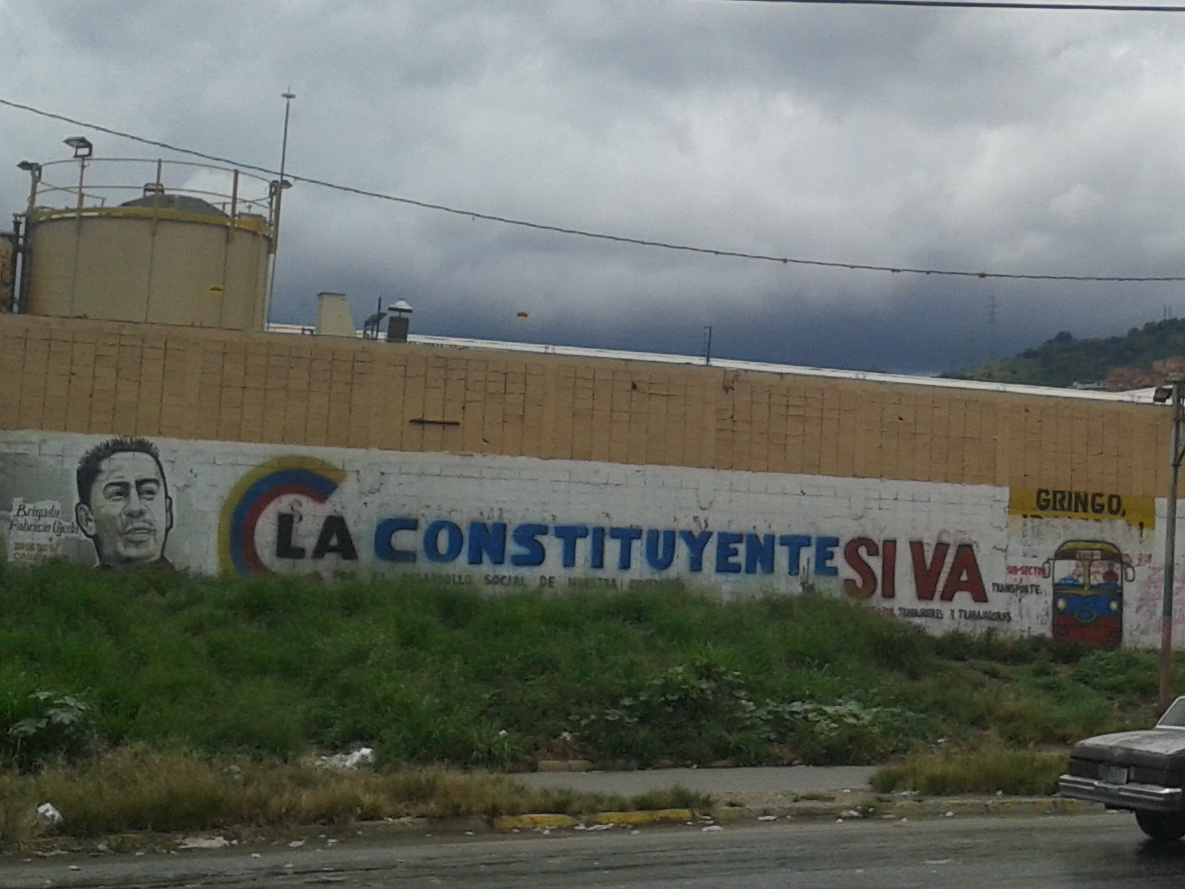
Mural promoting the Constituent Assembly.

At the rally, President Maduro criticized the governments of the United States, Mexico and Colombia and alleged that they attempted to intervene in Venezuela. President Maduro also ordered the opposition to participate in dialogue, stating "I propose that they abandon the insurrectional path and sit down to dialogue in the next few hours", warning his opponents that if they did not quickly participate, he would force dialogue through "constitutional law".

== Conduct ==
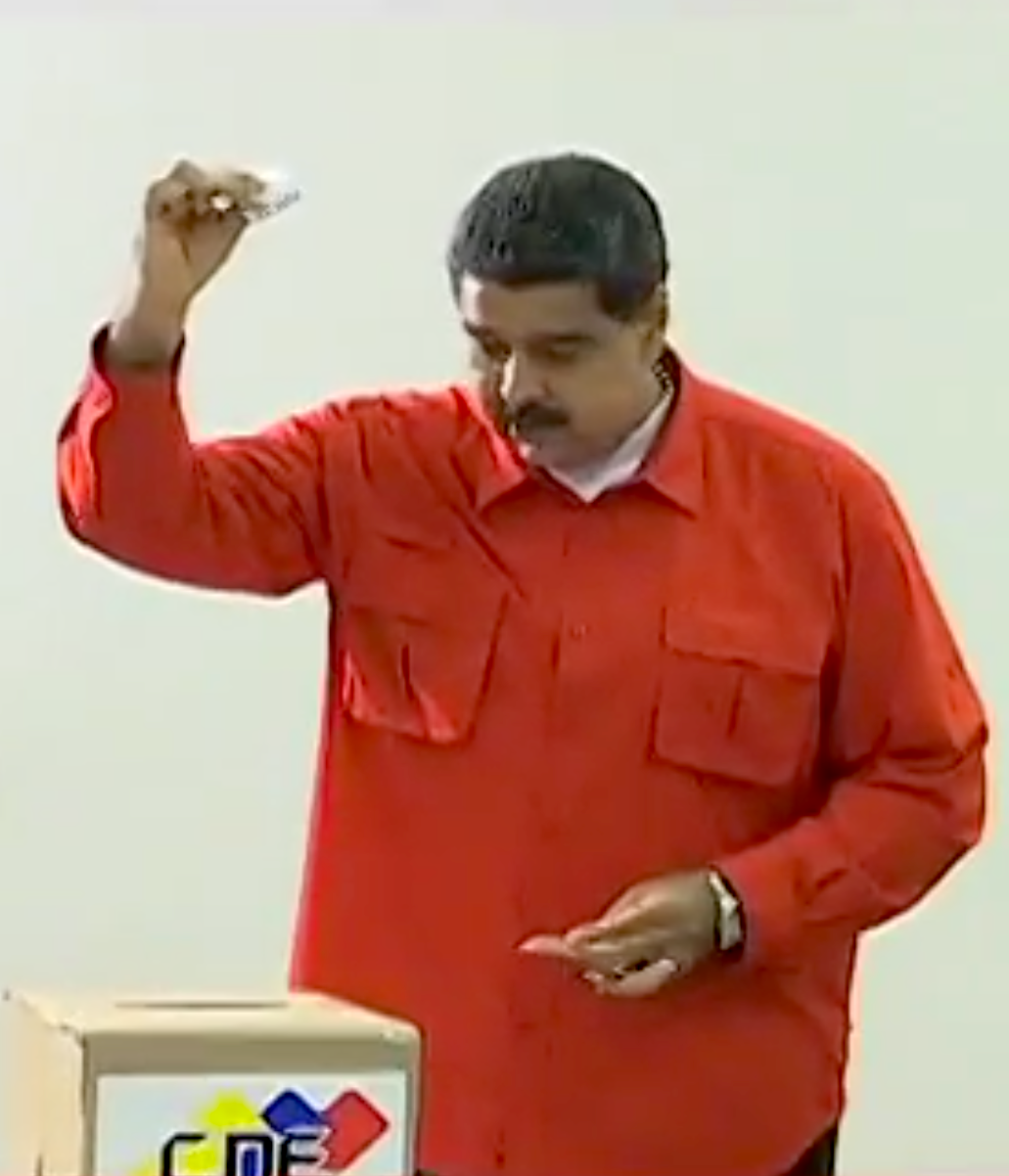
President Nicolás Maduro casting the first vote.

If there are 15,000 workers, all 15,000 workers must vote without any excuses ... Company by company, ministry by ministry, governorship by governorship, city hall by city hall, we're all going to vote for the Constituent Assembly.

— Nicolás Maduro

In the days leading to the election, workers of state-owned companies were warned that their jobs would be terminated the following day if they did not vote in the election. Furthermore, each worker was required to take another 10 voters to the elections, which would be tracked by the authorities. Management workers of state-run entities were threatened with being fired as well if they or their employees refused to vote. Many public workers remained conflicted due to the threat of being fired, knowing that their job benefits from the government would be cut and that their identity could be revealed in a similar manner to the Tascón List incident during the Venezuelan recall referendum in 2004. More than 90% of the workers did not obey the Bolivarian government's call to participate, which led to massive firings following the elections.

The day before the election, some military vehicles carrying election materials were attacked and their contents were destroyed. Other voting areas were also destroyed to prevent voting. A candidate was killed the night before the election.

On the morning of 30 July, President Maduro was the first to vote in the election. While scanning his Card of the Homeland during a public demonstration to show that the card could be scanned to see if an individual had already voted, a cell phone scanning his card read "The person does not exist or the card was canceled". Citizens of Caracas awoke to streets filled with barricades and various areas of protesters calling for democracy, with authorities responding to the demonstrations with force, firing tear gas at those gathered.

Protesters being repressed by authorities during election protests

By midday, Tibisay Lucena, the head of the CNE electoral body stated that "99% and more of the Venezuelan population is voting all over the country" and that Caracas had remained "calm", though media outlets observing polling areas at the time stated that turnout had been low. At about the same time, a bomb was detonated near a motorcycle convoy of the Bolivarian National Police, injuring seven officers.

A bomb being detonated near Bolivarian National Police

A leaked audio of Víctor Julio González, mayor of Santa Lucía in the Miranda state, said that he was worried that most of the polling stations were empty and the proposed participation had not been reached, asking for more voters to be mobilized. A leaked audio of Edison Alvarado, president of the Caracas Metro's worker union, voiced similar concerns, saying that according to the registry, only 300 workers voted and that he was "ashamed" to report such figure. Despite the empty streets and polling areas, the Bolivarian government extended voting hours, stating that there had still been large lines of voters still attempting to participate.

Following the CNE's approval of the results, President Maduro immediately stated that a commission would be created "to act ex officio and to lift the parliamentary immunity of those who have to lift it", and criticized the National Assembly, Attorney General Ortega, the media and President of the United States, Donald Trump, stating "What the fuck do we care about what Trump says". By the end of the day, at least 10 people are killed in violent incidents during the election. Maduro vowed to pursue the opposition "with the virtually unlimited powers of a constituent assembly", vowing that opposition officials would be jailed, the opposition-led National Assembly elected in 2015 would be dissolved and that the Public Ministry of Venezuela headed by Attorney General Luisa Ortega Díaz, who broke ranks from Maduro's government, would be restructured.

== Public opinion ==
Graphical summary

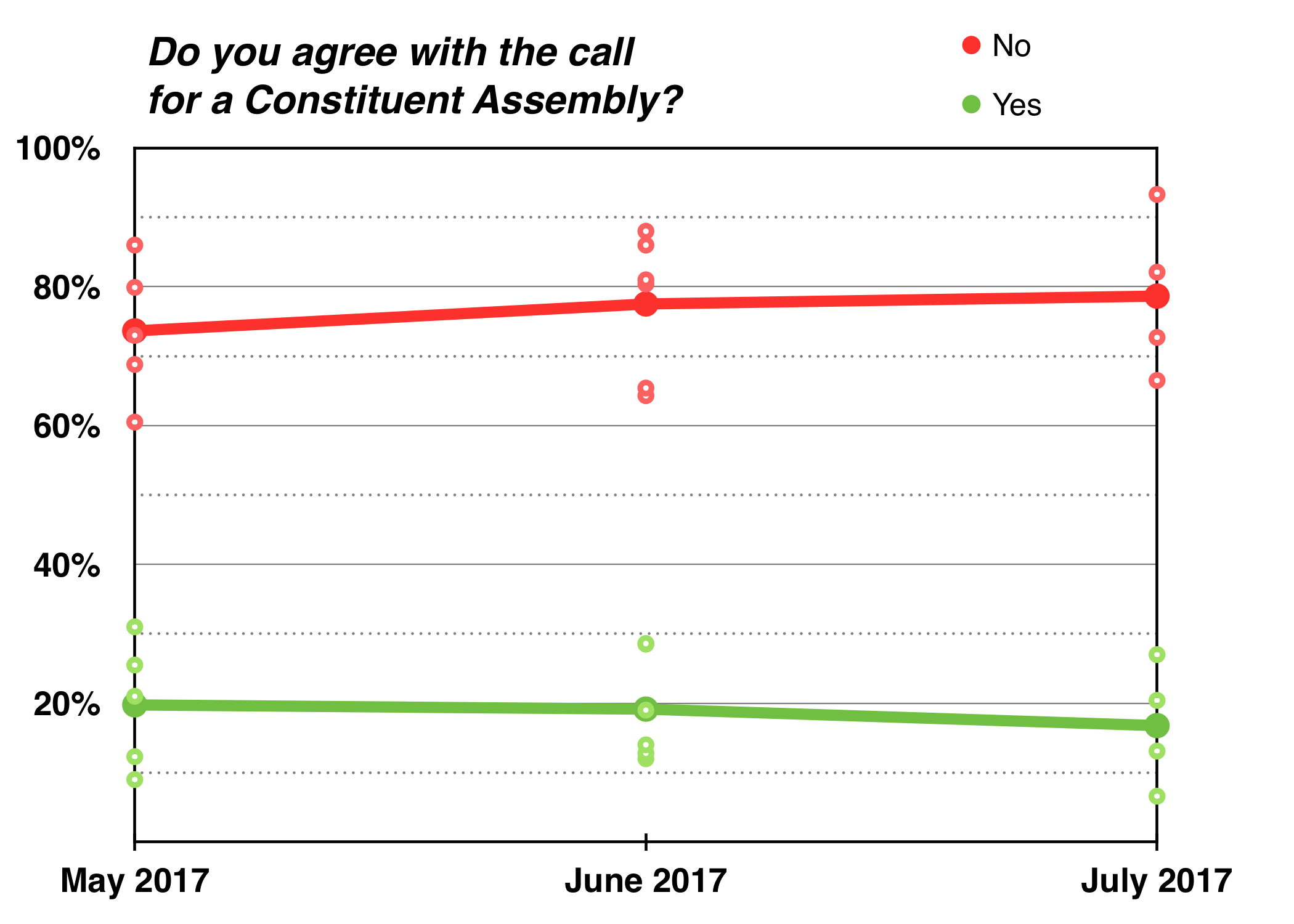
The red line represents percentage that say "No" to a Constituent Assembly. The green line represents percentage that say "Yes" to a Constituent Assembly. Dots are individual results of the polls seen below.

An 8 May poll found that 73% of Venezuelans disagreed with Maduro's Constituent Assembly, with 79% believing that they live in some form of dictatorship (49% believe absolute dictatorship, 30% believe it is a mix of a dictatorship and democracy). According to a May 2017 poll by More Consulting, 68.8% of the Venezuelans reject the proposal, and 72.9% (with more than 20% who consider themselves chavistas) consider the government a dictatorship. A poll taken by Hercon between 10–25 May 2017 found that 78.1% wanted Maduro out of office in 2017, 79.9% did not agree with the Constituent Assembly, 73.3% believed the CNE favored the ruling party (PSUV) and 75.5% thought that President Maduro started the Constituent Assembly proposal to establish a government similar to Cuba's.

Date(s) conducted	Polling organization	Sample size	Yes	No	Undecided	Lead
8–19 July	Datanalisis	500	20.4%	72.7%	3.8%	52.3%
7–12 July	Datanalisis	500	27.0%	66.5%	4.6%	41.8%
6–11 July	Hercon	1,200	13.1%	82.1%	4.7%	69.0%
30 June	Pronóstico	800	6.6%	93.3%	-	86.7%
22 June	Datanalisis	1,000	28.6%	65.4%	3.2%	36.8%
7–20 June	Consultores 21	2,000	12%	88%	N/A	76%
14 June	Meganálisis	–	12.8%	80.4%	6.7%	67.6%
10 June	Ceca	1,579	19%	81%	-	62%
7–9 June	Pronóstico	800	14%	86%	-	72%
29 May–4 June	Datanalisis	320	28.5%	64.3%	2.9%	35.8%
10–25 May	Hercon	1,200	12.3%	79.9%	7.7%	67.6%
10–17 May	UCV	1,200	9%	86%	5%	77%
8 May	Datincorp	1,199	21%	73%	5%	52%
5 May	MORE Consulting	1,000	25.5%	68.8%	5%	43.3%
May	Datanalisis	-	31.0%	60.5%	2.9%	29.5%

== Results ==
The first official announcement of preliminary results came when Tibisay Lucena, president of the National Electoral Council, announced that 8,089,230 persons voted, with a 41.53% turnout.

In the early afternoon of the voting day before the official announcement, Julio Borges, the president of the opposition-controlled National Assembly declared that no more than two million people voted in the process, stating that the CNE would later officially claim that about 8.5 million voted.

Smartmatic, the Venezuelan-owned company which provided the voting machines, stated that the results were tampered with by the CNE. The company said that the turnout was off by at least one million votes. Internal CNE documents obtained by Reuters revealed that only 3,720,465 votes had been cast by 5.30 p.m., though voting was extended to 7 p.m. and some centers are thought to have stayed open longer. Tibisay Lucena, president of the CNE, said that such allegations had been instructed from the United States. Information Minister Ernesto Villegas announced that the Constituent Assembly would further investigate the allegations. However, according to the Reuters report, both Chief Prosecutor Luisa Ortega Díaz and Luis Rondon, one of the CNE's five directors, spoke out against the results. "I'm absolutely sure that those numbers are not correct," said Ortega. "For the first time since I took up this commitment to the country, I cannot guarantee the consistency or veracity of the results offered," said Rondon.

Independent analysts voiced that the turnout was lower than what the CNE stated – somewhere between 11.3% and 21.0% – with Ratio-Ucab estimating that there were 2.2 million participants, Delphos estimating 3.1 million voters, and Torino Capital estimating 3,111,807 to 4,086,309 voters, settling at 3.6 million voters.

The 2017 Constituent Assembly of Venezuela was officially sworn in on 4 August 2017.

== Analysis ==
=== Journalists ===
Andrés Oppenheimer considers that the proposal would allow Maduro to abolish all the democratic institutions in Venezuela, in a similar process to the 1976 Constitution of Cuba.

Mariana Zuñiga and Nick Miroff stated in The Washington Post:

When your house is burning and smack in the path of a Category 5 hurricane, it's probably not the best time to tear down the frame and jackhammer the foundation. But those are the home improvement plans of President Nicolás Maduro, who is moving forward with a provocative attempt to rewrite Venezuela's constitution despite the country's descent into political and economic catastrophe.

=== Officials ===
Danilo Antonio Mojica Monsalvo, the magistrate of the Social Cassation Chamber of the TSJ, announced his disagreement with President Maduro's Constituent Assembly on 23 May 2017, stating that without a popular referendum voting on the assembly, the move would be "spurious ... a legal metaphor to describe what is done outside the Constitution". Another TSJ judge, Marisela Godoy, spoke out against Maduro's proposal the same day, stating "At this moment I support, without any fear, the attorney general (Luisa Ortega Díaz), who is not any official" and that if she were to be criticized by the government, she "does not care".

Gerardo Blyde, mayor of Baruta municipality, pointed out that, although the article 347 does authorize the proposal by President Maduro, it should have been ratified by a public referendum.

== Reactions ==
Map of countries who recognize ANC Venezuela Approve Disapprove Neutral

=== Supranational bodies ===
- European Union - The High Representative of the Union for Foreign Affairs and Security Policy, Federica Mogherini, stated that "The convening of a Constituent Assembly is disputed within Venezuelan society and therefore risks further polarizing the country and heightening the risk of confrontation". On 2 August following the election Mogherini stated that the European Union does not recognize the Constituent Assembly.
- Mercosur - The South American trade bloc suspended Venezuela as a member in response to the "rupture of the democratic order" in that country. The bloc by-laws have no provision for expulsion. However, trade and migration stay without changes, to avoid aggravating the social crisis. Brazilian Foreign Minister Aloysio Nunes said that Venezuela would remain suspended until the country "re-establishes democracy."

=== Governments ===
- Argentina – Mauricio Macri, president of Argentina, announced that his country does not accept the constituent assembly. An official report said: "Today's election does not honor the will of seven millions of Venezuelans who voted against this action. Argentina will not acknowledge the results of this illegal election". Macri also removed the Order of the Liberator General San Martín award from Maduro.
- Bolivia – On 30 July, President Evo Morales highlighted the democratic participation of the Venezuelan people in the vote to elect members of a new Constituent Assembly. Morales wished good luck to the Venezuelans in those elections.
- Brazil – The Ministry of Foreign Affairs stated that "the Government of Maduro rejected the requests of the international community to cancel the convocation of the Assembly" and that a Constituent Assembly "would form a parallel constitutional order not recognized by the population, which would further aggravate the institutional crisis that paralyzes Venezuela".
- Canada – The Minister of Foreign Affairs stated that "Canada denounces and condemns today's significant and undemocratic action by the Venezuelan regime. This constituent assembly will further escalate tensions in the country by robbing the Venezuelan people of their fundamental democratic rights." In September 2017, the Canadian government sanctioned 40 senior members of the Maduro government, including President Maduro, preventing Canadian nationals from participating in property and financial deals with him due to the rupture of Venezuela's constitutional order.
- Chile – The Ministry of Foreign Affairs stated that "the Government of Chile expresses its deep disappointment at the decision of the Venezuelan Government to have materialized today a process of election of representatives to a National Constituent Assembly without the minimum guarantees for a universal and democratic vote, nor to comply with The requirements established in the Constitution of that country."
- China - On 2 August, the Foreign Ministry said that the elections were generally held smoothly and also noted the reaction from all relevant sides. The ministry also said "We sincerely hope that all sides in Venezuela can orderly resolve the relevant issue with peaceful dialogue within a legal framework, and protect the country's stability and socio-economic development."
- Colombia – On 28 July, President Juan Manuel Santos said that the Venezuelan constituent assembly is of "illegitimate origin" and therefore would not be recognized and he would not recognize the results of the election.
- Costa Rica – Costa Rica's Ministry of Foreign Affairs states, "The Government of the Republic of Costa Rica does not recognize and considers void, tainted, unlawful, unconstitutional and contrary to popular will, the convocation, process and results for the composition of a National Constituent Assembly in the Bolivarian Republic of Venezuela".
- Cuba – The Foreign Affairs Ministry welcomed the election result and commended the people of Venezuela who it said "defied violent street blockings, economic sabotage and international threats." The Cuban Government reiterated its "unwavering solidarity with the Bolivarian and Chavez people and government and with its civic-military unity led by the constitutional president Nicolas Maduro." The Cuban Government also denounced what it described as a US-led campaign "to achieve the submission of the [Venezuelan] people to a puppet opposition that they financed."
- Ecuador – On 31 July, Ecuadorian Ministry of Foreign Affairs released a statement related to Venezuelan Constituent Assembly election where it stated that Ecuador maintained a position of respect for the Venezuelan people and their right to express their will. "Ecuador respects the inalienable right that all countries have to choose their political, economic, social and cultural system as an essential condition for guaranteeing the peaceful coexistence of nations and peace consolidation," said a statement from the Foreign Ministry. It also condemned the alleged interference of some nations in the internal affairs of other countries, and called for the peaceful settlement of disputes and conflicts.
- El Salvador – President Salvador Sánchez stated, "We are confident that the result of this election will, together with other efforts, contribute to the objective of achieving the atmosphere of tranquility that this sister nation needs".
- France – President Emmanuel Macron stated "Our citizens do not understand how some people could have been so complacent with the regime that is being established in Venezuela. A dictatorship is trying to perpetuate itself at an unprecedented humanitarian price".
- Guatemala – The Ministry of Foreign Affairs expressed "deep concern for the conduct of the elections to a National Constituent Assembly" and "believes that the National Constituent Assembly could not simply replace the current Legislative Assembly, democratically elected in 2015".
- Holy See – Secretary of State of His Holiness The Pope Pietro Parolin called for the suspension of the Constituent Assembly, stating, "the Holy See calls on all political actors, and in particular the Government, to ensure full respect for human rights and fundamental freedoms ... The ongoing initiatives such as the new Constituent Assembly, which, rather than fostering reconciliation and peace, encourage a climate of tension and conflict and takes the future for granted."
- Japan – The Ministry of Foreign Affairs Foreign Press Secretary Norio Maruyama stated, "Japan expresses its deep regret over the current political, economic, and social situation in Venezuela and considers the situation to be deeply lamentable ... that all issues are resolved democratically with a broad participation of the people and democracy is restored as soon as possible".
- Mexico – The Secretariat of Foreign Affairs stated that Mexico would not recognize the election and "regrets that the government of that country has decided to carry out elections contrary to universally recognized democratic principles, which do not conform to the constitution of the republic and which deepen the crisis".
- Nicaragua – The President Daniel Ortega and the Vice President Rosario Murillo congratulated the electoral process in Venezuela.
- Norway – Børge Brende, Minister of Foreign Affairs, stated that he was "Deeply concerned about the grave situation in Venezuela" and that Norway sides itself with the European Union's HR, believing that the election would only fuel polarization.
- Panama – President Juan Carlos Varela stated that the election would not be recognized and condemned the abuses of the Maduro government.
- Paraguay – Paraguay's Ministry of Foreign Affairs displayed "its position to ignore the illegal convocation or the results of the illegitimate process to integrate a Constituent Assembly" and warned of Venezuela's suspension from Mercosur.
- Peru – The Ministry of Foreign Affairs said the election was "illegitimate" and that the "election violates the norms of the Venezuelan Constitution and contravenes the sovereign will of the people, represented in the National Assembly".
- Portugal – Minister of Foreign Affairs Augusto Santos Silva stressed the urge to "return to constitutional normality" and to "fully respect the powers of elected organs and the separation of powers", while condemning any form of violence. The Government agrees with the position of the European Union even though it "still has not considered the possibility of other political or diplomatic action".
- Russia – The Government of Russia criticized Venezuela's opposition, saying it attempted "to hamper the elections, provoking clashes that have resulted in human losses. We urge the opposing parties to stop the pointless violent confrontation." The Russian government added: "We hope that those representatives of regional and international communities, who, as one can assume, do not want to recognise the results of the elections in Venezuela and who apparently want to increase economic pressure on Caracas will display restraint and abandon their destructive plans, which can only polarise society further."
- Spain – The Government of Spain stated, "Spain regrets that the Government of Venezuela has decided to continue with a constitutional process that is not accepted by the majority of Venezuelans and violates essential democratic principles", explaining that they would not recognize the election.
- Switzerland – The Federal Department of Foreign Affairs released a statement saying, "Switzerland is deeply concerned about the current situation and increasing violence in Venezuela. To prevent a further escalation, Switzerland calls on the government not to proceed with the establishment of the national constituent assembly and to respect the separation of powers".
- Syria – The Foreign and Expatriates Ministry congratulated the Venezuelan government on the election, stating it "proved the Venezuelan people's adherence to the sovereignty and the independent national decision of their country and their insistence on exerting all efforts to get out of the current crisis." The Syrian Government added that it "condemns all foreign attempts aimed at meddling in [Venezuela's] affairs and disrupting its stability".
- Ukraine – The Ministry of Foreign Affairs of Ukraine "strongly opposed" the attempts by the Venezuelan government to usurp power, as well as to violate basic democratic rights and freedoms of its citizens, including the right to peaceful assembly and freedom of expression. The ministry also supports the appeals and efforts of the global community aimed at resolution of the crisis in Venezuela, including by means of holding free and democratic elections.
- United Kingdom – Secretary of State for Foreign and Commonwealth Affairs Boris Johnson called for the cancellation of the election saying it would "undermine" Venezuela's democracy, stating, "I call on President Nicolás Maduro to change course and break the deadlock for the benefit of all Venezuelans".
- United States – The United States Department of State condemned the election and refused to recognize it, stating "We will continue to take strong and swift actions against the architects of authoritarianism in Venezuela, including those who participate in the National Constituent Assembly". The day following the election, the United States Department of the Treasury sanctioned President Maduro, freezing his assets, banning United States citizens from dealing with Maduro and barring him from entering the United States, stating "These sanctions come a day after the Maduro government held elections for a National Constituent Assembly that aspires illegitimately to usurp the constitutional role of the democratically elected National Assembly, rewrite the constitution, and impose an authoritarian regime on the people of Venezuela".

=== Others ===
- Human Rights Watch – The human rights NGO opposed the call for the Constituent Assembly, stating that President Maduro "will effectively set the stage to perpetuate himself in power, at the expense of Venezuelan democracy and the human rights of the Venezuelan people".
- Carter Center - The Carter Center was dismayed by the events that took place in Venezuela in the recent days, condemned the process to elect a National Constituent Assembly because it "was carried out in the complete absence of electoral integrity, posing serious problems of legitimacy, legality, and procedure" and urged the political forces "to restore confidence that has been lost because of their attempt to establish divisive parallel institutions".
- Venezuelan Episcopal Conference – Head of the Venezuelan Episcopal Conference, Archbishop Diego Padrón, stated that "This congress has been pushed forward by force and its result would be to render constitutional a military, socialist, Marxist and communist dictatorship".
- Socialist International – In their statement, Socialist International stated that they have "followed with grave concern the recent events in Venezuela, where the government of Nicolás Maduro, through a process contrary to the Constitution in force in that country, carried out ... a vote to elect members of A Constituent Assembly" and that Maduro's government "deepens the break with democracy and increases repression and violence" and for Venezuela, the group asked for "the entire international community to act decisively to preserve its freedom and all its rights".

== See also ==
- Members of the 2017 National Constituent Assembly of Venezuela
- 2018 Venezuelan presidential election
