= Supreme Tribunal of Justice =

A number of national supreme courts style themselves "Supreme Tribunals of Justice":

- Supreme Tribunal of Justice (Bolivia) (Tribunal Supremo de Justicia)
- Superior Court of Justice (Brazil) (Superior Tribunal de Justiça)
- Supreme Court of Justice (Portugal) (Supremo Tribunal de Justiça)
- Supreme Tribunal of Justice (Venezuela)
- Supreme Tribunal of Justice of Venezuela in exile

== See also ==
- Tribunal Constitucional (disambiguation)
- Category:National supreme courts
