= Los Enanos =

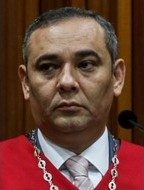
- Maikel Moreno, one of the most prominent alleged members.
- Founded: 2006
- Founding location: Venezuela
- Years active: 2006–present
- Territory: Venezuela
- Ethnicity: Venezuelan
- Membership: Around 15 members
- Leader: Unknown
- Activities: Judicial corruption, protection of drug traffickers, obstruction of justice
- Notable members: Maikel Moreno, Luis Velásquez Alvaray, Mariano Díaz Ramírez, Gustavo Perdomo

Los Enanos is a judicial group in Venezuela whose existence was denounced after the assassination of prosecutor Danilo Anderson, who was part of the Public Ministry and was investigating the Puente Llaguno events. The organization has been mentioned in several corruption cases.

== History ==
In early 2006, magistrate of the Supreme Tribunal of Justice Luis Velásquez Alvaray accused Vice President José Vicente Rangel, Minister of Interior Jesse Chacón, and President of the National Assembly Nicolás Maduro of knowing the members and leading a large criminal judicial group known as “Los Enanos.” According to Velásquez Alvaray, the group held real power in the Palace of Justice and mainly operated to protect drug traffickers. Velásquez Alvaray declared that at least fifteen judges were part of the group, including Maikel Moreno.

Besides the accusations, Velásquez Alvaray also denounced banker Arné Chacón for pressuring him to have the judicial system deposit funds in his Bankinvest bank and accused some of his colleagues in the Supreme Tribunal of Justice of having ties to drug trafficking. Jesse Chacón, Minister of the Interior and brother of Arné Chacón, accused Velásquez Alvaray of embezzling money through commissions and overpricing in real estate acquisitions for the tribunal. Some observers argued that the accusation may have been a political maneuver to remove a prominent member of one of the government factions.

In 2006, Alvaray was removed from his position as judge. He attributed his dismissal to the group. The complaint against Maikel Moreno was later dismissed by the prosecution. Marisela Caraballo Anderson, sister of prosecutor Danilo Anderson, denounced obstruction of justice and irregularities that attempted to derail the investigation into her brother's murder, which included identifying the Banda de los Enanos. Among those also accused of being part of the group are Mariano Díaz Ramírez and Gustavo Perdomo. The group has also been accused of hiding files and criminal records in exchange for large commissions. By 2021, media outlets reported that the Banda de los Enanos continued to operate.
