= Luis Velásquez Alvaray =

Venezuelan politician (1954–2025)

Member of the National Assembly of Venezuela
- In office 2000–2004

Member of the Supreme Tribunal of Justice
- In office 17 January 2005 – 8 June 2006

Personal details
- Born: 1954 Venezuela
- Died: May 17, 2025 (aged 71) Costa Rica
- Education: University of the Andes
- Occupation: Politician, lawyer

Luis Velásquez Alvaray (1954 – 17 May 2025) was a Venezuelan politician and lawyer, who served in the National Assembly from 2000 to 2004 and was a member of the Supreme Tribunal of Justice from 2005 to 2006.

Velásquez died of prostate cancer in Costa Rica, on 17 May 2025, at the age of 71.
