= Migbelis Castellanos =

Venezuelan actress, TV host, and model (born 1995)

- Born: Migbelis Lynette Castellanos Romero; June 7, 1995 (age 31); Cabimas, Zulia, Venezuela
- Height: 1.71 m (5 ft 7 in)
- Spouse: Jason Unanue (m. 2024)
- Children: 1
- Beauty pageant titleholder
- Title: Miss Venezuela 2013; Nuestra Belleza Latina 2018
- Hair color: Blonde
- Eye color: Green
- Major competitions: Miss Venezuela 2013; (Winner); Miss Universe 2014; (Top 10); Nuestra Belleza Latina 2018; (Winner)

Migbelis Lynette Castellanos Romero (born June 7, 1995) is a Venezuelan actress, TV host, model and beauty pageant titleholder. She represented the Costa Oriental of the state of Zulia at the Miss Venezuela 2013 pageant. She represented Venezuela, and eventually became a Top 10 finalist at Miss Universe 2014. She was also crowned as Nuestra Belleza Latina 2018.

== Early life and career ==
Castellanos was born in Cabimas, Venezuela, on June 7, 1995, as the second; of the three children of Miguel Ángel Castellanos and Isbelia Del Valle Romero from Zulia. Her brothers are: Miguel Leonardo and Moisés Miguel. As a child, she dreamed of being a professional baseball player like her father, who played with the Tiburones de La Guaira and in the United States, with the Texas Rangers minor league players.

From a very young age she was attracted to the world of modeling and television. She appeared on local television in children's programs on "TV COL", tried her luck on radio through the favorite stations in her region in a weekly program.

Since she was a teenager she dreamed of participating and winning Miss Venezuela. She was Mini Reina Venezuela 2003, she was also Miss Teen Costa Oriental 2010 and a pre-candidate for the Feria de la Chinita 2012.

In 2011 she did not manage to enter the casting of the Chinita Fair because she was a minor. In 2013, Migbelis managed to enter Miss Venezuela, where with an outstanding participation she managed to win at the end of the contest. Migbelis attended the Universidad Rafael Belloso Chacín, in Maracaibo, where she was pursuing two BAs, one in Social Communication and another one in Political Science in the Universidad del Zulia (LUZ-Maracaibo), which she later took online; while preparing for Miss Universe 2014 and subsequently dropped out.

In mid-2014, she began a relationship with Francisco Cervelli; with whom she went to live in Tampa, Florida in 2015, after her participation in Miss Universe 2014. On December 18, 2016, she announced her engagement and in mid-2018; they ended the relationship.

On October 10, 2020, she confirmed on the television show Salt and Pepper; who tested positive for COVID-19.

== Personal life ==
After being on Hinge (app) for four months and being rejected by Raya (app), on April 1, 2023; Univision sent her to work in New Jersey to moderate a private event for Goya Foods and there she met the American businessman Jason Unanue, who belongs to the Unanue family (great-grandson of Spaniard Prudencio Unanue Ortiz; founder of said company and at the same time, great-nephew of Joseph A. Unanue) and they started a romantic relationship. On August 16, 2024, she announced her pregnancy on the Univision television show; Desiguales, in which Castellanos is the host. On September 30, they revealed that they would have a boy. On October 28 of that year, she announced his marriage commitment. On November 23 of that same year; they were married in Roman Catholic Church of Saint Pius X, in Old Tappan, New Jersey; with a reception in Jersey City, New Jersey and on March 25, 2025, she gave birth to Caden.

== Pageantry ==
=== Miss Teen Costa Oriental ===
In 2010, Migbelis won the title Miss Teen Costa Oriental 2010

=== Miss Venezuela 2013 ===
After an outstanding participation in the reality show Miss Venezuela, Todo por la corona, Migbelis managed to be among the 26 selected for the final night of Miss Venezuela 2013.

Then, she participated in the 61st edition of the most important beauty pageant in her country, Miss Venezuela, which was held at the Poliedro de Caracas, on October 10, 2013; representing the Costa Oriental del Lago de Maracaibo region, where she is from. At the end of the event, Castellanos was crowned Miss Venezuela 2013 by the hands of the outgoing queen Gabriela Isler, who the following month became Miss Universe 2013.

Castellanos temporarily becomes host of the "Estrenos y Estrellas" space on the Venevisión Newscast. In February 2014, he traveled to Atlanta to study English; for just over two months, as part of her preparation for the Miss Universe 2014; on the recommendation of María Gabriela Isler. On September 6, 2014, she traveled to New York Fashion Week. Finally, on October 9, 2014, she gave her Miss Venezuela crown to Mariana Jiménez.

In November 2014 she traveled to Miami to record the program "Camino a la Corona" on the Telemundo, prior to the universal pageant and at the same time she was a special guest on the program Un Nuevo Día on said network.

During his reign, Castellanos visited various cities such as Barquisimeto, Maracaibo, Maracay, Ciudad Guayana, Punto Fijo, Valencia, Venezuela, among others in Venezuela; in addition to Miami and New York City in the United States. She was the image of Samsung, Grupo Bimbo y Procter & Gamble. She also posed for OK! magazines Venezuela, De Galas, Paréntesis, Blush, Tendencia and Todo en domingo.

=== Miss Universe 2014 ===
Migbelis represented Venezuela at Miss Universe 2014, which was held on Sunday, January 25, 2015, at Florida International University in Doral, Miami, Florida and she placed in the Top 10, finishing 10th overall.

=== 2015-2018 ===
Although she was away from television during this time, Migbelis made 2 plays titled "Todo por una Arepa" and "Mujeres Infieles", alongside the leading Venezuelan American actress Sonya Smith. This stage of Migbelis's theater served as preparation for future professional challenges.

=== Nuestra Belleza Latina 2018 ===
After becoming a Real estate agent and considering working at Uber, looking for new opportunities; leaving behind fears and insecurities and all the controversy that surrounded her for being "overweight" during Miss Universe 2014, on July 1, 2018; announced her intention to join the ranks of Univision's Nuestra Belleza Latina program, where she managed to obtain the opportunity to go to Miami and fight for a place to enter the "NBL University." At the end of the event, on December 2; that same year, she established herself as the new queen of Nuestra Belleza Latina 2018 with 46% of the public's votes, giving Venezuela its first victory in this reality show. Contrary to popular belief, Castellanos is not the first South American to win the competition as 2011 winner Nastassja Bolívar, who represented Nicaragua, is half Colombian. As her prize for winning the pageant, Castellanos gets a one-year contract with Univision. Also, she gets $100,000 from winning the pageant. After said triumph, in March 2019; Univision gave her the opportunity to study at the Centro de Educación Artística, where he stayed for two weeks, receiving intensive vocalization classes.

Awards and achievements
Preceded by (Dominican Republic) Clarissa Molina	Nuestra Belleza Latina; 2018	Succeeded by (Honduras) Sirey Moran
Preceded by Gabriela Isler	Miss Venezuela; 2013	Succeeded by Mariana Jiménez
Preceded by Karen Soto	Miss Costa Oriental; 2013	Succeeded by María José Marcano
