= Jhannett Madriz =

Venezuelan politician and judge

Judge of the Supreme Tribunal of Justice of Venezuela
- Incumbent
- Assumed office Since 2010

Ambassador of Venezuela to Canada

Personal details
- Occupation: Politician

Jhannett María Madriz Sotillo is a Venezuelan politician and judge. She currently serves as a magistrate of the Electoral Chamber of the Supreme Tribunal of Justice of Venezuela.

== Career ==
Jhannett was born in Caracas, Venezuela. Between 1998 and 2010 she was an Andean deputy of Venezuela; in Peru she received at least six distinctions for her work as a parliamentarian. She also served as Venezuela's ambassador to Canada until that year.

In 2010 she was appointed by the pro-government National Assembly as a judge of the Supreme Tribunal of Justice of Venezuela.

== Sanctions ==
Madriz was sanctioned on 30 May 2018 by the government of Canada, following the presidential elections in Venezuela that month, by listing her as an official "responsible for, or complicit in, gross violations" of human rights, "significant acts of corruption, or both.".

== See also ==
- International sanctions during the Venezuelan crisis
