= Second inauguration of Nicolás Maduro =

53rd presidential inauguration of Venezuela

Second presidential inauguration of Nicolás Maduro
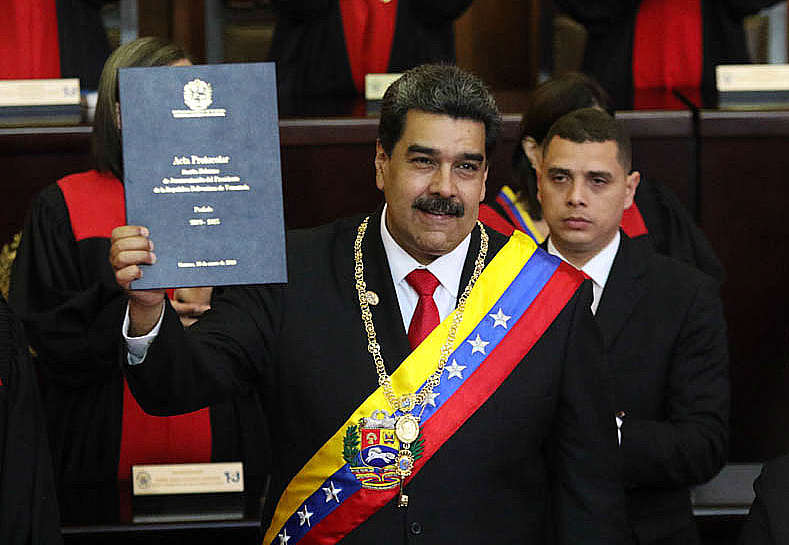
- Nicolás Maduro shortly after his swearing-in
- Date: 10 January 2019; 7 years ago
- Time: 3:00pm VST (UTC-4)
- Venue: Supreme Tribunal of Justice of Venezuela
- Location: Caracas, Venezuela
- Also known as: 2019 Presidential inauguration of Nicolás Maduro
- Participants: Nicolás Maduro; 53rd president of Venezuela — Assuming office Maikel Moreno; President of the Supreme Tribunal of Justice — Administering oath Delcy Rodríguez; Vice President of Venezuela — Assuming office

The second inauguration of Nicolás Maduro as President of Venezuela took place on Thursday, 10 January 2019. The inauguration involved the swearing-in of Nicolás Maduro for his second term, and, especially within the context of Maduro's election, has been controversial and contested by various figures and organizations.

== Election ==
On 20 May 2018, elections were held across Venezuela to elect the President to take office in January 2019. These elections were initially scheduled for December 2018. The Constituent Assembly announced the election, although it did not have the power to do so constitutionally. Several of the main opposition candidates, such as Henrique Capriles, Leopoldo López and Antonio Ledezma, were disqualified from running.

The official turnout reported by the National Electoral Council was 46.07%. The Democratic Unity Roundtable estimated the turnout at 25.8%, based on its quick count estimates. Maduro dismissed allegations of foul play, and stated that "the opposition must leave us alone to govern".

The contention around the legitimacy of the inauguration was primarily based on the unusual activity of the election. Several Venezuelan NGOs, such as Foro Penal Venezolano, Súmate, Voto Joven, the Venezuelan Electoral Observatory and the Citizen Electoral Network, expressed their concern and cited the lack of the Constituent Assembly's competencies to summon the elections, impeding participation of opposition political parties, and the lack of time for standard electoral functions, and many countries worldwide, such as the European Union, Latin American governments and the United States, declared that the election was illegitimate.

== Inauguration ==
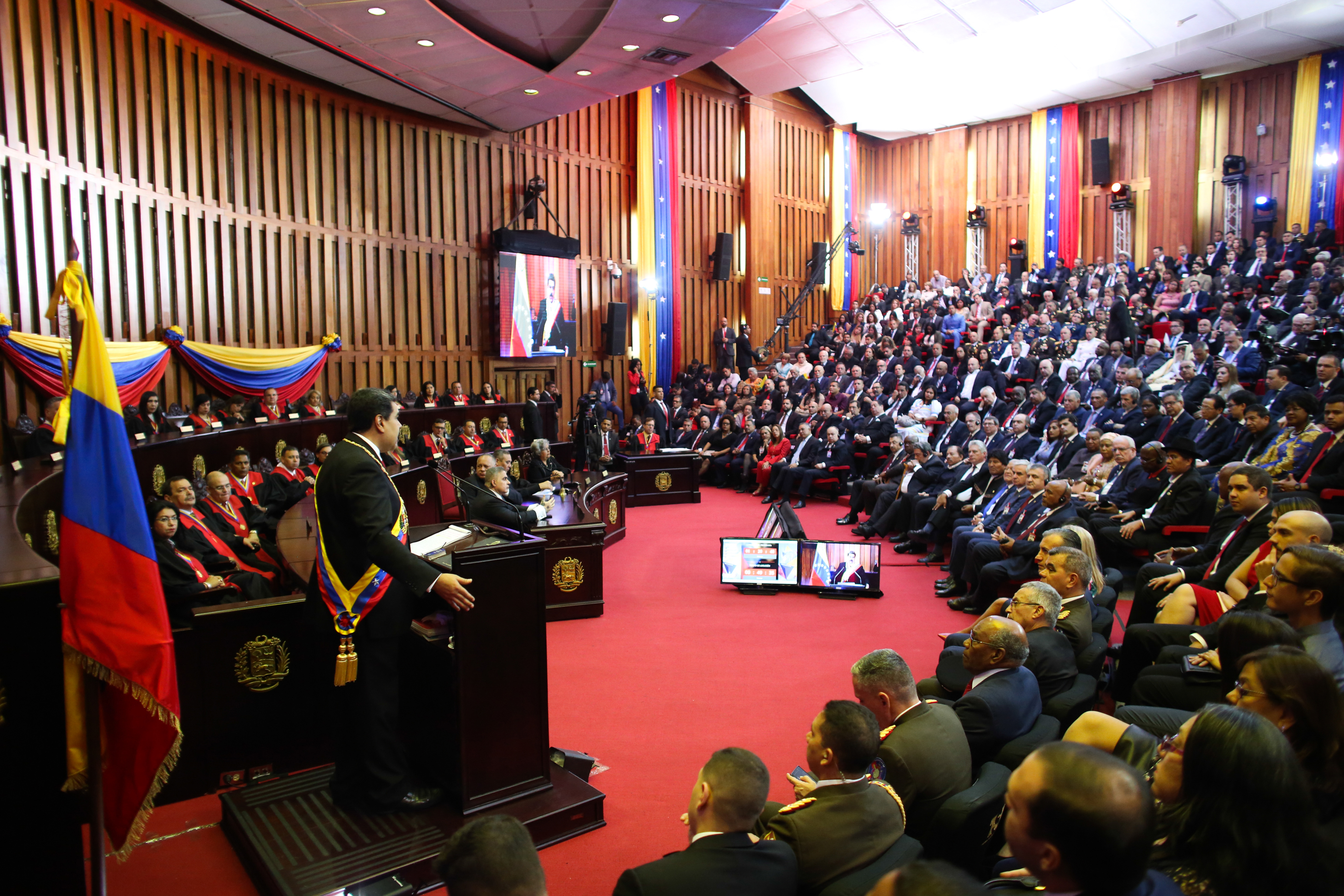
The Supreme Court chamber during the ceremony

Maduro's inauguration took place on 10 January 2019 in the Supreme Court building in Caracas.

The Venezuelan constitution specifies that inaugurations should be conducted by the National Assembly, at the Federal Legislative Palace. The Maduro administration views the National Assembly as being "in contempt", so his inauguration was officiated by the Supreme Court instead. Maduro was sworn in by Maikel Moreno, President of the Supreme Court, at 3:00pm; he ignored calls from the Lima Group to hand over power to the National Assembly until another election could be held.

Before the stage, a large military parade—which had moved through Caracas—took place on Avenida Bolívar, and the military gave its inaugural pledge of undying loyalty to Maduro for his six-year term. At the start of the inauguration, Maikel Moreno went blank and stuttered, having forgotten what to say, before looking to the side and continuing. Maduro gave an 80-minute address to those gathered, in which he stated: "We are a true, profound, popular and revolutionary democracy [...] I, Nicolás Maduro Moros, am a genuinely and profoundly democratic president." He also directly threatened Colombia, the United States, and Europe, telling the latter to "respect Venezuela […] or sooner rather than later you’ll pay the historical price". He also criticized his own party and political affiliation, saying that his plan for his second term was to "correct the mistakes of the Bolivarian Revolution", and that "corrupt chavistas" are actually his greatest threat.

Maduro said that 94 countries were present at his inauguration, but this count included the members of international organizations like the African Union and the Arab League. The number of UN-recognized countries who sent representatives to the inauguration act was 16: Bolivia, Cuba, Nicaragua and El Salvador sent their presidents; Turkey and Suriname sent their vice presidents; Belarus, Saint Kitts and Nevis and Saint Vincent and the Grenadines sent their prime ministers; and Antigua and Barbuda, China, Dominica, Granada, Iran, Mexico and the SADR sent diplomatic representatives. Palestine sent representatives, and both Abkhazia and South Ossetia were represented by their respective presidents; all three are not officially-recognized members of the UN.

=== Support ===
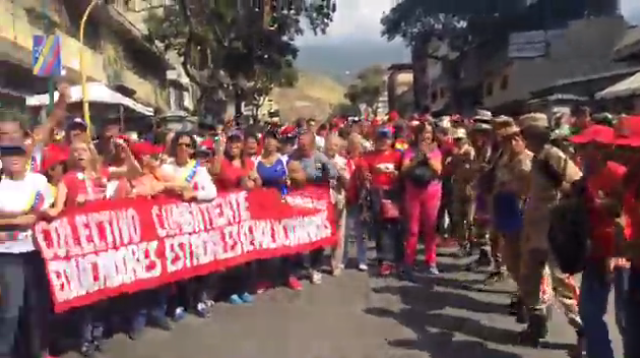
Maduro supporters at the inauguration

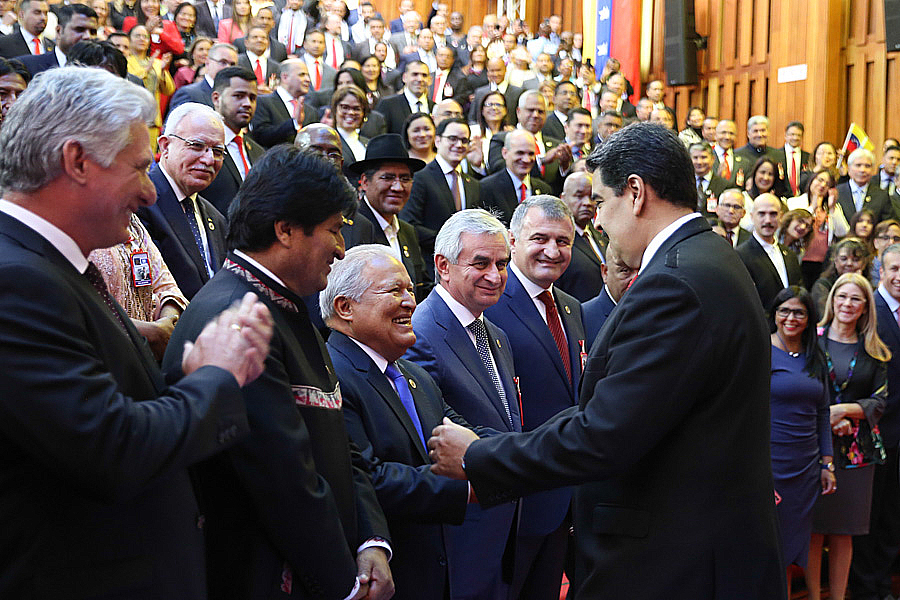
President Salvador Sánchez Cerén of El Salvador greets Maduro

The "small" crowd gathered for the inauguration showed "little support"; this has been compared to the large crowds present at Maduro's first inauguration. Ricardo Sánchez, a member of the Constituent Assembly, said that there was obvious national support for Maduro at the inauguration, and that "[the government is] convinced that the majority of the people who voted for the president in May are united today with loyalty and discipline to be with Nicolás Maduro for another six years". It has also been reported that some people present at the inauguration were forced to appear, including all those who work for the government; one woman told The Guardian that she had been forced to attend. She also said that despite working in a government Ministry, she isn't paid enough to feed her family, and is planning to leave the country as soon as possible. Others at the inauguration were present because they believe in Maduro; one laborer said he can "identify with Maduro because he's a humble man" and shares his ideology.

In addition, Turkish President Recep Tayyip Erdoğan voiced solidarity with Maduro, and Cuban President Miguel Díaz-Canel, Bolivian President Evo Morales, President Daniel Ortega of Nicaragua, President Salvador Sánchez Cerén of El Salvador, Prime Minister of Saint Vincent and the Grenadines Ralph Gonsalves, Prime Minister of Saint Kitts and Nevis Timothy Harris and Vice President of Suriname Ashwin Adhin attended Maduro's swearing-in ceremony among representatives of other countries.

=== Criticism ===
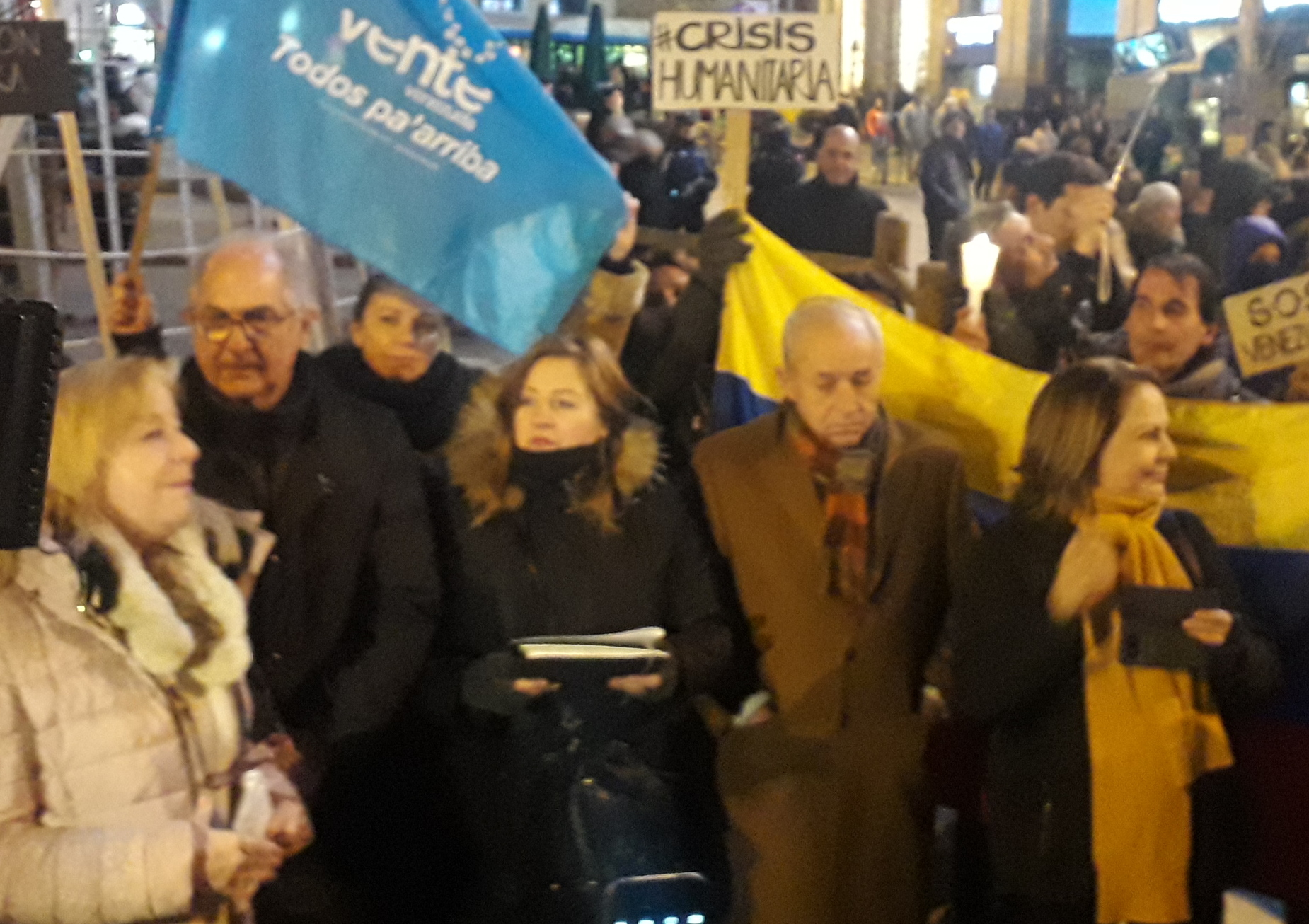
Antonio Ledezma along Spanish politicians in Madrid after Maduro's inauguration.

Protests were reported in several Venezuelan states, including Lara, Zulia, Trujillo, and in the capital city Caracas. Several cacerolazos were reported in many areas of Caracas, including near the Supreme Tribunal, where Maduro was sworn in.

Large protests also took place in Miami, United States, an area with a large Venezuelan migrant population, as well as a dozen other nations worldwide, including multiple protests across Spain and its islands. Protests also took place in cities such as Barcelona, Bogotá, Buenos Aires, Lima, London, Madrid, Ottawa, Paris and Quito.

== Response ==
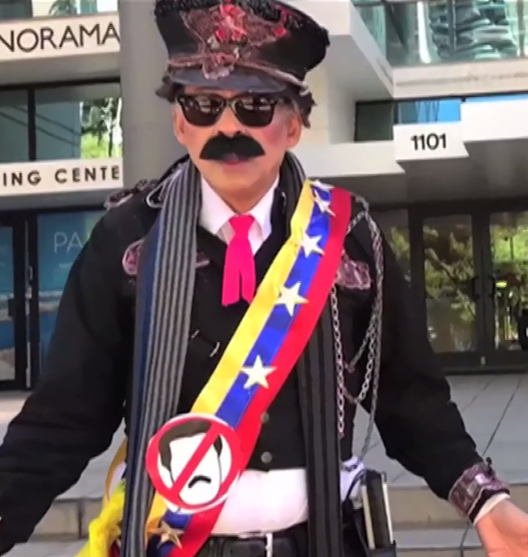
A Miami protester dressed as a caricature of Maduro

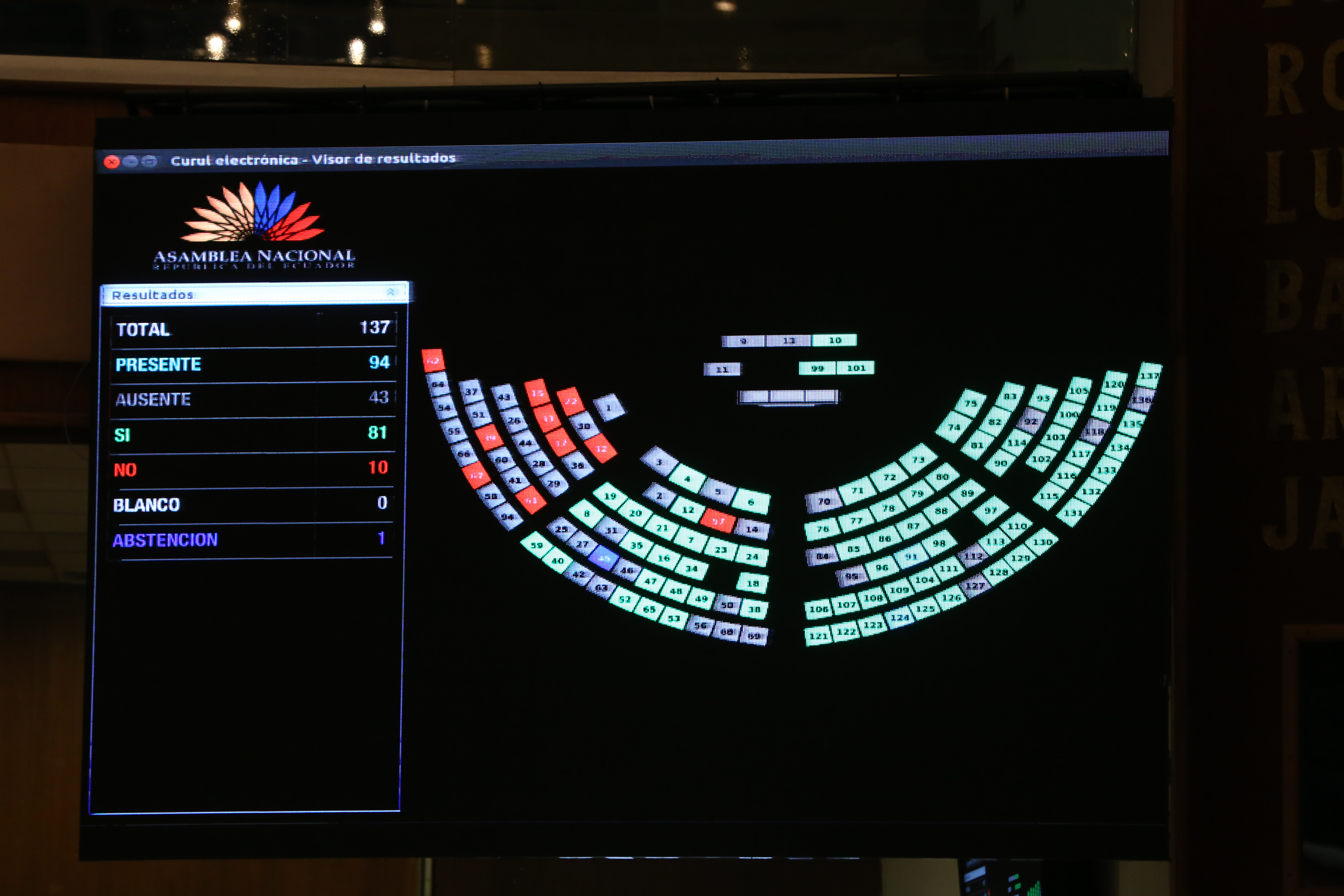
Ecuador's National Assembly 16 January vote on denouncing Maduro

Many nations and supranational bodies did not recognize Maduro as a legitimate President, including the Lima Group and the Organization of American States. John R. Bolton, U.S. National Security Advisor, said, "The US will not recognize the Maduro dictatorship's illegitimate inauguration." In response, Maduro said during his inauguration that the United States and Lima Group's lack of recognition was turning his ceremony into "a world war". On 11 January, Russia accused the US of attacking Venezuela's freedom.

In response to Maduro's inauguration, Argentine President Mauricio Macri stated "Venezuela is living under a dictatorship". South African President Cyril Ramaphosa congratulated Maduro following his inauguration.

On 11 January, Venezuelan ministers claimed there were violent attacks on the Venezuela Embassy in Lima, Peru. Peru and Paraguay closed their embassies in Venezuela and recalled diplomats, and Paraguay also removed Venezuelan diplomats from its own country. Peru also barred Maduro and 100 other Venezuelan politicians from entering the country, and Argentina similarly banned the entry of Venezuelan government personnel. As a collective, the Lima Group announced that if Maduro took office they would ban travel to their nations and stop military cooperation, supposedly tactics designed to turn the Venezuelan military against their leader. Mexico abstained from the group announcement, with new president Andrés Manuel López Obrador citing the non-intervention policies of his government. In response to the group's announcement, Maduro threatened them with "diplomatic measures" if they didn't revoke the resolution. David Smilde from the Washington Office on Latin America had said despite preemptive threats from the Lima Group, he didn't expect any of the member countries to actually remove embassies. Instead, he thought that they would simply tell Maduro that he is illegitimate and that they would be ignored. However, the Lima Group did follow through with their threats, and Smilde suggested that this action would make Maduro and his allies "fret". In a foreign ministry statement, Brazil called on "all of the world's countries" to "stop supporting [Maduro] and come together to liberate Venezuela".

On 7 January 2019, several days before the inauguration, Supreme Court Justice and member of the Electoral Commission Christian Zerpa, who had previously been aligned with Maduro, defected to the United States, calling Maduro "incompetent" and the elections "unfair". In response, the government said that Zerpa had fled the country in order to escape charges of sexual harassment. US intelligence also suggested that there was more fracturing within Maduro's close ranks, and that his general Vladimir Padrino López had threatened to resign if Maduro took office.

Though many called for power in Venezuela to be deferred to the National Assembly, Phil Gunson of the Caracas Crisis Group said that the opposition, which has the Assembly's majority, was not united well enough to bring the failing state into prosperity.

Economically, Maduro's continued rule has led experts to estimate that Venezuela would experience at least 23 million percent inflation by the end of 2019.

=== National Assembly responses ===
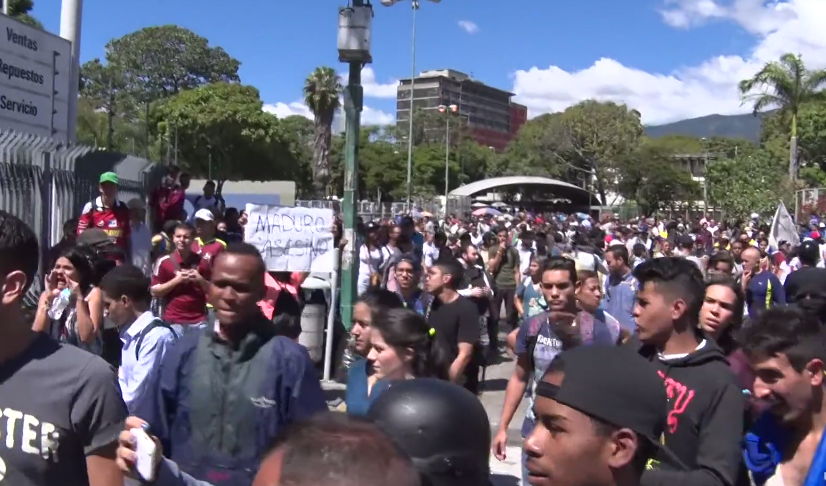
Opposition protesters at UCV during the inauguration

Juan Guaidó, the President of the National Assembly of Venezuela, gave a speech in the Assembly after Maduro's inauguration. In no uncertain terms it called for a reclamation of power, and declared that Venezuela was technically without a leader, stating that "today there is no head of state. Today there is no commander-in-chief". Beforehand, the opposition had called on the people to protest during the inauguration, and they boycotted it. Students took part in one protest led by Rafaela Requesens and Guaidó's Popular Will party, blocking off a road and again calling Maduro a "usurper".

In an official statement on the day of Maduro's inauguration, Guaidó announced a state of emergency, emphasizing the need to recover control by uniting the people, foreign allies, and the military. He expressed anger that Maduro continues to "dismantle" the rule of law and that Venezuela has ended up with a de facto government. In response to Maduro's "usurpation" he then proposed on behalf of the government "to declare the usurpation of the office of the President", saying "we call on those soldiers who wear their uniforms with honor to step forward and enforce the Constitution [...] we ask citizens for confidence, strength and to accompany us on this path." He also said that Maduro's inauguration was a "coronation of paper", and defied the idea that Maduro could fully disband the National Assembly, which he said he would.

From its opening on 5 January, the National Assembly has been formulating plans to implement a transitional government, before taking back control. On 11 January, Guaidó summoned an open cabildo (Spanish: Cabildo abierto); the term roughly translates as a "town hall meeting", but cabildos abiertos were historically convened for more emergent or disastrous matters. At the open cabildo, the National Assembly announced Guaidó's assumption of presidential powers and duties.
