= Maikel Moreno =

Venezuelan lawyer and judge (born 1965)

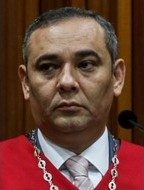
- Moreno in 2020

President of the Supreme Tribunal of Justice of Venezuela
- In office 24 February 2017 – 27 April 2022
- Preceded by: Gladys Gutiérrez
- Succeeded by: Gladys Gutiérrez

Vice President of the Supreme Tribunal of Justice of Venezuela
- In office 11 February 2015 – 24 February 2017
- President: Gladys Gutiérrez
- Preceded by: Diego Lopez
- Succeeded by: Guillermo Issa

Justice of the Supreme Tribunal of Justice of Venezuela
- In office 28 December 2014 – 27 April 2022
- Appointed by: National Assembly
- Preceded by: Antonio Tannous

Personal details
- Born: Maikel José Moreno Pérez; 12 December 1965 (age 60) El Tigre, Anzoátegui, Venezuela
- Spouse: Debora Menicucci
- Children: 3
- Education: Universidad Santa María (LL.D.)
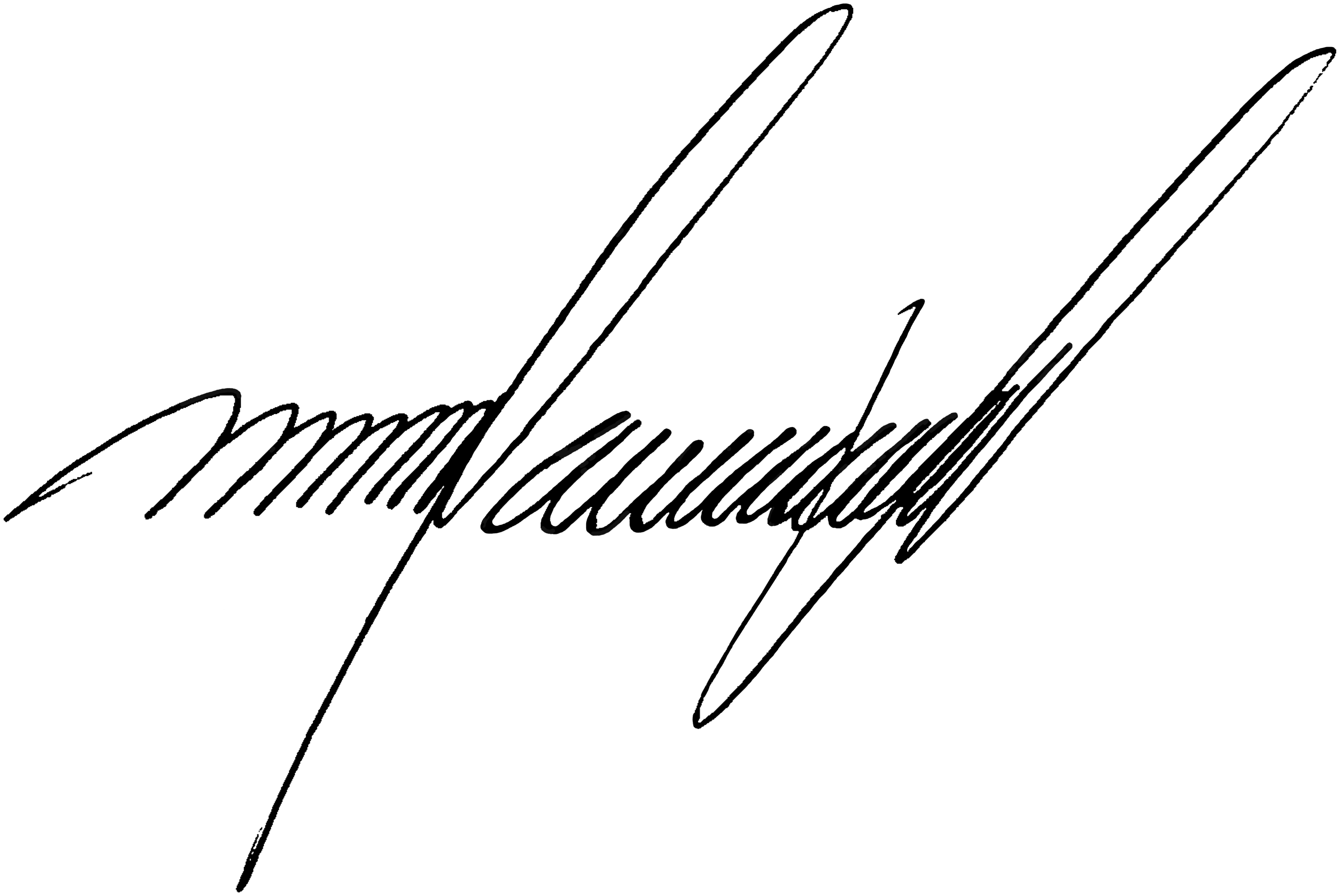
- Signature
- Criminal information
- Penalty: Crimes against the United States; Money laundering; Financial fraud

Details
- Date apprehended: Most Wanted Fugitive

Maikel José Moreno Pérez (born 12 December 1965) is a Venezuelan lawyer and judge who served as president of the Supreme Tribunal of Justice of Venezuela from 2017 until 2022.

Moreno is currently a fugitive as part of an investigation by the HSI of United States Immigration and Customs Enforcement (ICE). He is the prime suspect and was charged in the United States for crimes against the U.S., money laundering, and engaging in shady financial transactions in property. ICE has publicly announced a $5 million reward for his arrest. Previously, Moreno was incarcerated for murder.

== Career and education ==
=== DISIP and criminal record ===
Moreno began his career serving Venezuela by joining the DISIP (now the Bolivarian National Intelligence Service (SEBIN). In 1987, Moreno was indicted for murder in Ciudad Bolívar and imprisoned for two years before being released.

In 1989, he began to work with DISIP once more, serving as a bodyguard for President Carlos Andrés Pérez. Later that year in Caracas, Moreno was allegedly involved in the murder of 19-year-old Rubén Gil Márquez during a brawl in Parque Central. A year later in 1990, Moreno was released due to his connections to DISIP.

=== Education ===
Shortly after being released, Moreno attended Universidad Santa María and graduated from their law program in 1995. At this time it is believed that Moreno became acquainted with future First Lady of Venezuela and wife of Nicolás Maduro, Cilia Flores. He would later return to the university and earn a doctorate in Venezuelan law in 2014.

=== Judge ===
Under the Hugo Chávez administration, Moreno served as a lower-level judge. Following the 2002 attempted coup d'état that nearly overthrew Chávez, Moreno prosecuted many government opponents between 2002 and 2005. He prosecuted law enforcement leader Iván Simonovis, accusing him of leading the violent acts of the coup attempt which eventually led to the imprisonment of Simonovis.

Moreno also defended in court many of the chavistas involved in the Llaguno Overpass events who fired upon opposition protesters. He also took cases against opposition individuals who were accused of being involved in the murder of Danilo Anderson.

=== Supreme Tribunal Justice ===
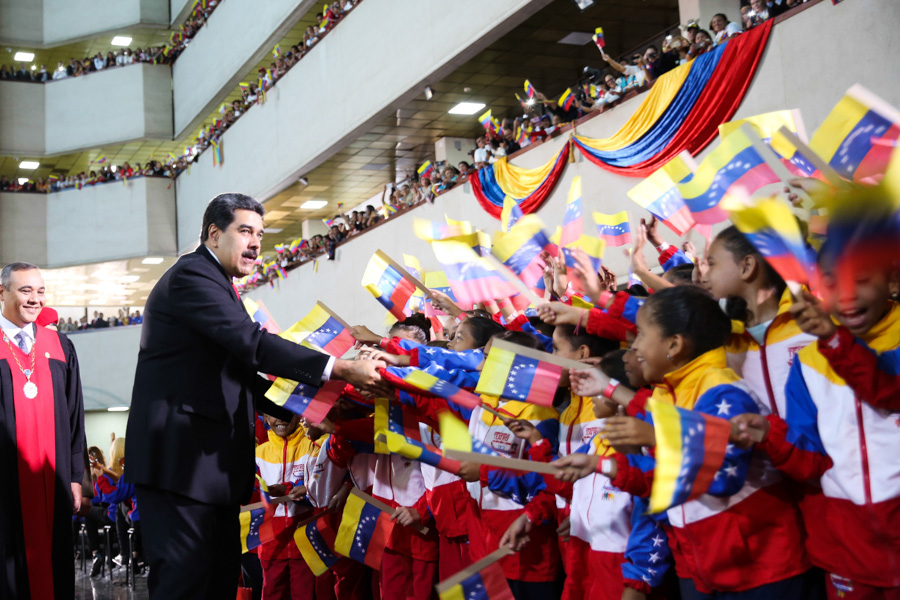
Moreno (left) with President Nicolás Maduro during his second inauguration

On 28 December 2014, he was sworn in as magistrate of the Criminal Cassation Chamber of the Supreme Court of Justice by the National Assembly, ratifying the sentence against Leopoldo López during his term. He was also the first vice-president of the Supreme Court and president of the criminal cassation chamber in the plenary session in 2015. He currently holds the presidency of the Supreme Court.

== Sanctions ==
Moreno has been sanctioned by several countries and is banned from entering neighboring Colombia. The Colombian government maintains a list of people banned from entering Colombia or subject to expulsion; as of January 2019, the list had 200 people with a "close relationship and support for the Nicolás Maduro regime".

The U.S. Treasury Department sanctioned Moreno and seven members of the Venezuelan Supreme Justice Tribunal (TSJ) in May 2017 for usurping the functions of the Venezuelan National Assembly and permitting Maduro to govern by decree. The U.S. assets of the eight individuals were frozen, and U.S. persons prohibited from doing business with them.

Canada sanctioned 40 Venezuelan officials, including Moreno, in September 2017. The sanctions were for behaviors that undermined democracy after at least 125 people will killed in the 2017 Venezuelan protests and "in response to the government of Venezuela's deepening descent into dictatorship". Canadians were banned from transactions with the 40 individuals, whose Canadian assets were frozen.

The European Union sanctioned seven Venezuela officials, including Moreno, on 18 January 2018, singling them out as being responsible for deteriorating democracy in the country. The sanctioned individuals were prohibited from entering the nations of the European Union, and their assets were frozen.

In March 2018, Panama sanctioned 55 public officials, including Moreno, and Switzerland implemented sanctions, freezing the assets of seven ministers and high officials, including Moreno, due to human rights violations and deteriorating rule of law and democracy.

On 20 April 2018, the Mexican Senate froze the assets of officials of the Maduro administration, including Moreno, and prohibited them from entering Mexico.

On 21 July 2020, the United States imposed sanctions on Moreno and offered a $5 million reward for information leading to his arrest or conviction.

== Investigations ==
On 6 April 2023, Italy confiscated a mansion owned by Maikel Moreno, registered in the name of his wife Debora Menicucci, with a value equivalent to 6 million dollars, as the result of an investigation by the Guardia di Finanza on an alleged case of money laundering in the purchase of the villa.

== Personal life ==
In September 2020 he announced that he had tested positive for COVID-19.
