= Tribunal Constitucional =

Tribunal Constitucional may refer to:

- Constitutional Court, special court defined by the Portuguese Constitution
- Tribunal Constitucional de Espana, the supreme interpreter of the Spanish Constitution
- Tribunal Constitucional del Ecuador, the highest court in Ecuador
