= Supreme Tribunal of Justice of Venezuela in exile =

Supreme court in exile

Supreme Tribunal of Justice
- Tribunal Supremo de Justicia
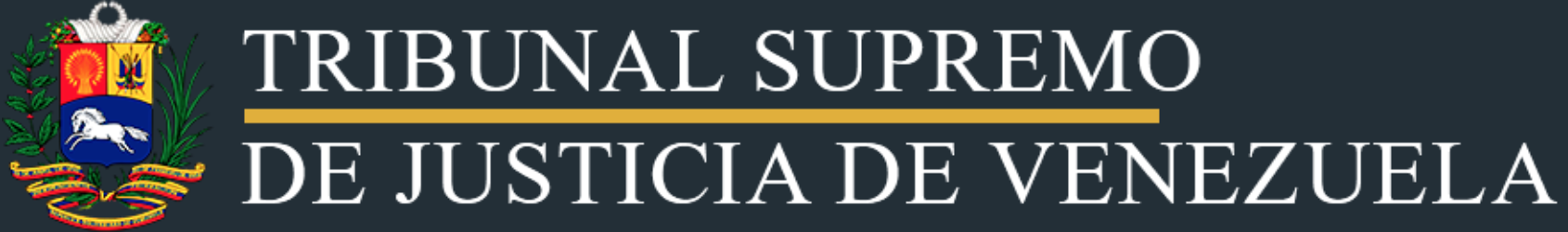
- Established: 2017
- Jurisdiction: Venezuela
- Authorised by: Constitution of Venezuela
- Number of positions: 33
- Website: Official website

President
- Currently: Miguel Ángel Martín

The Supreme Tribunal of Justice of Venezuela (TSJ) in exile is an institution that some, including the Organization of American States, consider to be the legitimate highest court of law in Venezuela and the head of the judicial branch, as opposed to the Supreme Tribunal of Justice. It was established on 21 July 2017 following the 2017 Venezuelan constitutional crisis. The TSJ's 33 members have been based in Chile, Colombia, Panama, and the United States due to the political crisis in Venezuela.

The Supreme Court is based on the universal jurisdiction and the principles of the Nuremberg, the former Yugoslavia and the Rwanda Tribunals. The Organization of American States, the European Parliament and the Inter-American Federation of Lawyers have recognized the legitimacy of the court, while both the national government and the Supreme Tribunal of Justice in Venezuela do not recognize the appointment.

== History ==
=== Foundation ===
Following the death of President Hugo Chávez, Venezuela faced a severe socioeconomic crisis during the presidency of his successor, President Nicolás Maduro, as a result of their policies. Due to the state's high levels of urban violence, inflation, and chronic shortages of basic goods attributed to economic policies such as strict price controls, civil insurrection in Venezuela culminated in the widespread protests in the country.

The discontent with the Bolivarian government saw the opposition being elected to hold the majority in the National Assembly of Venezuela for the first time since 1999 following the 2015 Parliamentary Election. As a result of that election, the Bolivarian officials of the lame duck National Assembly filled the Supreme Tribunal of Justice with their allies.

Both the opposition and several jurists have defined the appointment as illegal for not being performed according to the constitution and the Organic Law, including the challenges period, their lack of responses and the omission of the definite selections of the candidates. According to a mid 2016 report issued by the Venezuelan NGO Acceso a la Justicia (Access to Justice), only one of seven justices of the Constitutional Chamber comply with the requirements for the position demanded by Venezuelan laws and their designation process was irregular. On 14 June 2016 the National Assembly nullified the appointment carried out in 2015.

Following months of unrest surrounding the recall referendum against President Maduro in 2016, on 29 March 2017 the Bolivarian Supreme Tribunal of Justice ruled that the National Assembly was "in a situation of contempt", because of the aforementioned rulings against the election of some of its members. It stripped the Assembly of legislative powers, and took those powers for itself; which meant that the Court would have been able to create laws. The court did not indicate if or when it might hand power back. As a result of the ruling, the 2017 Venezuelan protests began surrounding the constitutional crisis, with the Bolivarian Supreme Tribunal of Justice reversing its ruling on 1 April 2017.

After being stripped of power during the constitutional crisis and the call for a rewriting of the constitution by the Bolivarian government, opposition-led National Assembly of Venezuela created a Judicial Nominations Committee on 13 June 2017 to elect new members of the Supreme Tribunal of Justice. On 12 July 2017, Ombudsman Tarek Saab, head of the Moral Council of Venezuela, said that the call for new magistrates would not be officially recognized by the Bolivarian government and that the magistrates already appointed by the lame duck Bolivarian National Assembly would instead continue to be recognized. Despite the rejection of recognition by the Bolivarian government, the opposition-led National Assembly then voted 33 magistrates into office on 21 July 2017, creating a de jure Supreme Tribunal of Justice separate from the Bolivarian government.

== Structure ==
The Supreme Tribunal is divided in six chambers or instances that divide the work depending on its competences, which are the following:

- Constitutional Chamber
- Politic-Administrative Chamber
- Electoral Chamber
- Civil Cassation Chamber
- Social Cassation Chamber
- Criminal Cassation Chamber

All of the chambers are part of the Plenary Chamber.

=== Constitutional Chamber ===
Main:
- Miguel Ángel Martín Tortabu
- Elenis del Valle Rodríguez Martínez
- Coromoto Janette Cioly Zambrano Álvarez

Alternate:

- Luis Manuel del Valle Marcano Salazar
- Zuleima del Valle González
- Gabriel Ernesto Calleja Ángulo
- Gustavo José Sosa Izaguirre

=== Criminal Cassation Chamber ===
Main:
- Pedro José Troconis Da Silva
- Alejandro Jesús Rebolledo

Alternate:

- Milton Ramón Ladera Jiménez
- Cruz Alejandro Graterol Roque
- Beatriz Josefina Ruiz Marín

=== Politic-Administrative Chamber ===
Main:
- Ángel Vladimir Zerpa Aponte
- Antonio José Marval Jiménez

Alternate:

- José Luis Rodríguez Piña
- Ramsis Ghazzaoui
- Manuel Antonio Espinoza Melet
- José Fernando Nuñez Sifontes

=== Electoral Chamber ===
Main
- Alvaro Marín

Alternate

- Domingo Javier Salgado Rodríguez
- Idelfonso Ifill
- Rommel Rafael Gil Pino

=== Civil Cassation Chamber ===
Main:
- Gonzalo Antonio Álvarez Domínguez
- Evelyna del Carmen D’Apollo Abraham
- Ramón José Pérez Linares

Alternate:

- Gonzalo José Oliveros Navarro
- Thomas David Alzuru Rojas
- Luis María Ramos Reyes

=== Social Cassation Chamber ===
Main:
- Rubén Carrillo Romero
- José Savino Zamora Zamora

Suplente:

- Rafael Antonio Ortega Matos

== Rulings ==
=== Presidential cases ===
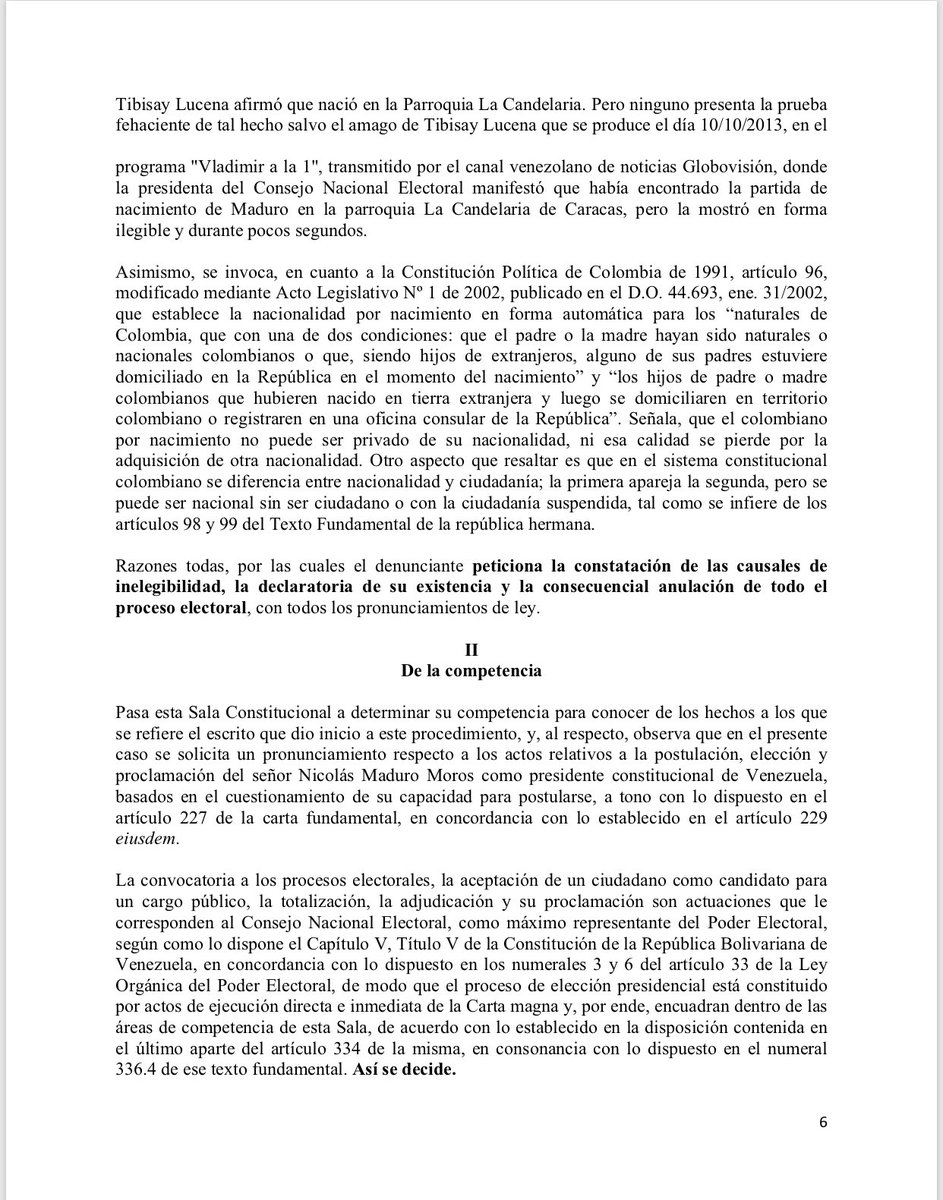
Sentence of the Supreme Tribunal in exile that annuls the 2013 presidential elections and requests the presidency and the CNE to send a certified copy of the president's birth certificate, as well as the resignation from his Colombian nationality

On 11 January 2018, the Supreme Tribunal decreed the nullity of the 2013 Venezuelan presidential elections after lawyer Enrique Aristeguita Gramcko presented evidence about the presumed non-existence of ineligibility conditions of Nicolás Maduro to be elected and to hold the office of the presidency. Aristeguieta argued in the appeal that, under Article 96, Section B, of the Political Constitution of Colombia, Nicolás Maduro Moros, even in the unproven case of having been born in Venezuela, is "Colombian by birth" because he is the son of a Colombian mother and by having resided in that territory during his youth. The Constitutional Chamber admitted the demand and requested the presidency and the Electoral Council to send a certified copy of the president's birth certificate, in addition to his resignation from Colombian nationality.

On 2 July 2018, the Supreme Tribunal ruled that Maduro was no longer the legitimate President of Venezuela and called for the opposition-led National Assembly of Venezuela to appoint a new President of Venezuela. The ruling was supported by Secretary General of the Organization of American States Luis Almagro. Days later on 9 July 2018, the Supreme Tribunal ordered CICPC to arrest Maduro and present him to them to face trial.

Maduro was sentenced unanimously to 18 years and 3 months in prison on 15 August 2018 by the tribunal, with the exiled high court stating "there is enough evidence to establish the guilt ... [of] corruption and legitimation of capital". The Organization of American States supported the verdict and asked for the Venezuelan National Assembly to recognize the TSJ in exile's ruling.

=== Humanitarian aid ===
On 8 February 2019, under case file SC-2017-003, the Supreme Tribunal announced the authorization for the entry of an international military coalition to secure the entry and protection of humanitarian aid to Venezuela.

== Recognition ==
The Secretary General of the Organization of American States, Luis Almagro, has shown support for the Supreme Tribunal of Justice in exile. The Senate of Chile and the Chamber of Deputies of Chile also recognized the TSJ in exile as the legitimate judicial branch of Venezuela.

However, the Maduro government did not recognize the Tribunal.
