= Supreme Tribunal of Justice (Venezuela) =

Venezuelan supreme court

Supreme Justice Tribunal
- Tribunal Supremo de Justicia
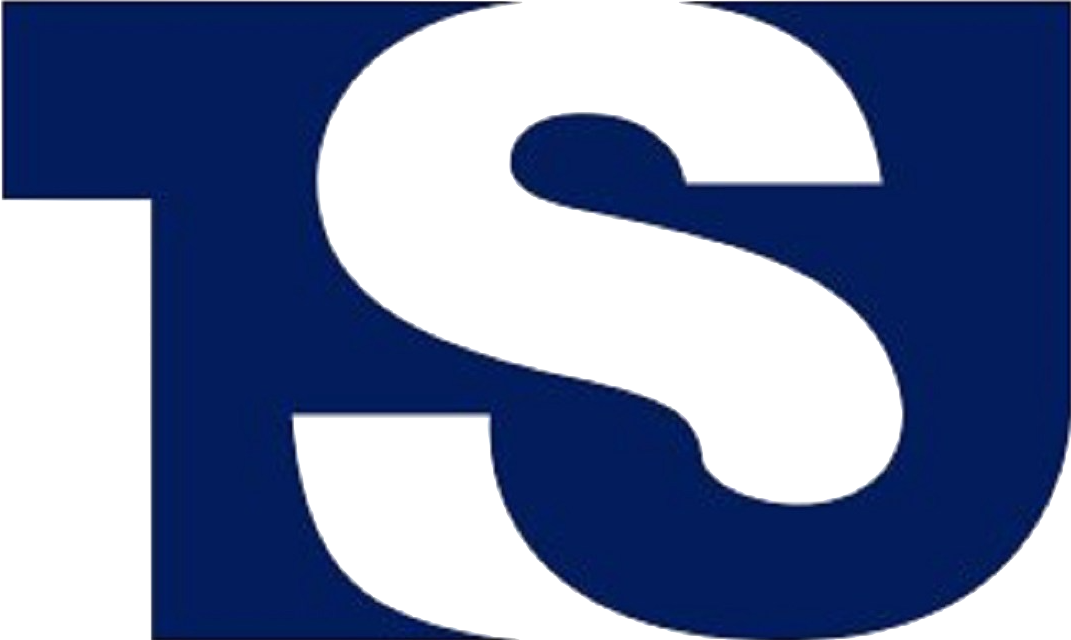

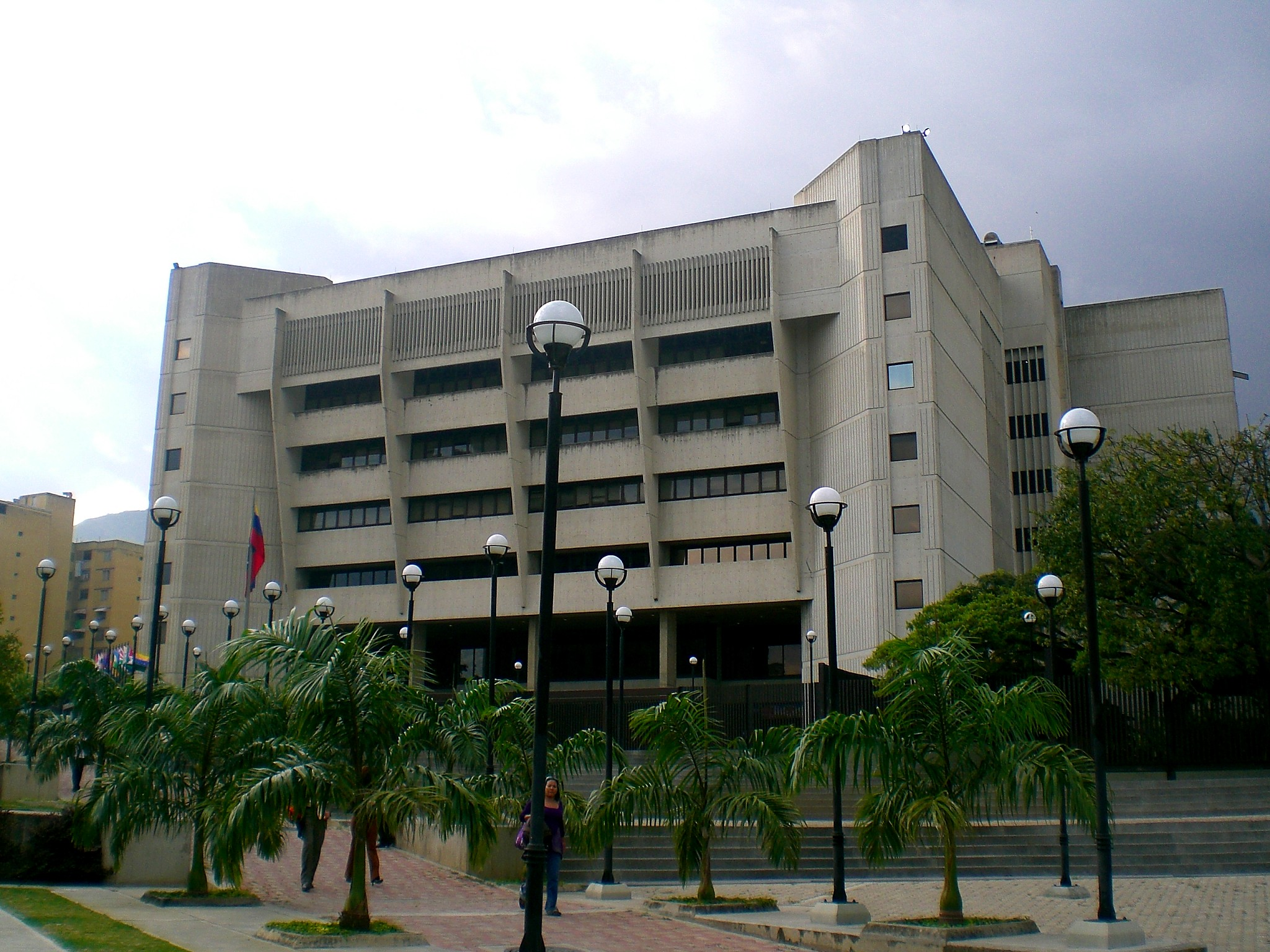
- TSJ building in Caracas
- Established: 1999; 27 years ago
- Jurisdiction: Venezuela
- Location: Caracas
- Authorised by: Constitution of Venezuela
- Website: Official website

President
- Currently: Caryslia Rodríguez
- Since: 17 January 2024

The Supreme Justice Tribunal (Spanish: Tribunal Supremo de Justicia or TSJ) is the highest court of law in the Bolivarian Republic of Venezuela and is the head of the judicial branch. As the independence of the Venezuelan judiciary under the regime of Nicolás Maduro is questioned, there have recently been many disputes as to whether this court is legitimate.

The Supreme Tribunal may meet either in specialized chambers (of which there are six: constitutional, political/administrative, electoral, civil, criminal, and social) or in plenary session. Each chamber has five judges, except the constitutional, which has seven. Its main function is to control, according to the constitution and related laws, the constitutionality and legality of public acts.

The Supreme Tribunal's 32 magistrates (magistrados) are appointed by the National Assembly and serve non-renewable 12-year terms. Appointments are made by a two-thirds majority, or a simple majority if efforts to appoint a judge fail three times in a row. Under article 265 of the 1999 Constitution, judges may be removed by a two-thirds majority of the National Assembly, if the Attorney General, Comptroller General, and Human Rights Ombudsperson have previously agreed to a "serious failure" and suspended the judge accordingly.

== History and controversies ==
The Tribunal was created under the 1999 Constitution of Venezuela, replacing the Supreme Court of Venezuela. For some years provisional statutes regulated the number of judges – initially 20, with three in each chamber except the constitutional, which had five – and their selection. The statutes were replaced in 2004 by an organic law (a law required to clarify constitutional provisions). The law also permitted the National Assembly to revoke the appointment of a judge, by a simple majority, where a judge had provided false information as to their credentials.

=== 2002 coup d'état ===
In a controversial sentence, on 14 August 2002, after the 2002 Venezuela coup d'état, the Supreme Tribunal acquitted Division Generals Efraín Vásquez (Army) and Pedro Pereira (Aviation), Vice-admirant Héctor Ramírez and Counter admiral Daniel Comisso in a rebellion trial. According to the sentence, "con los pronunciamientos efectuados en abril, los altos oficiales acusados no desconocieron al Gobierno, sino la orden dictada por el presidente de la República de aplicar el Plan Ávila, porque resultaba contraria a la protección de los derechos humanos de la ciudadanía y ello significaría una masacre".(With the pronouncements made in April, the accused high-ranking officials did not ignore the Government, but the order issued by the President of the Republic to apply the Avila Plan, because it was contrary to the protection of the human rights of citizens and this would mean a massacre.)

The sentence argued that there was a "power vacuum" after the Military High Command chief, General Lucas Rincón announced that Chávez had resigned from office. The discontent of the Venezuelan government was considerable; Chávez condemned the sentenced, stating "Esos once magistrados no tienen moral para tomar ningún otro tipo de decisión, son unos inmorales y deberían publicar un libro con sus rostros para que el pueblo los conozca. Pusieron la plasta".(Those eleven magistrates have no moral to make any other kind of decision, they are immoral and should publish a book with their faces so that the people know them. They put the plasta). Chávez announced a strategy to revert the decision, creating a commission in the National Assembly to review the stay of the justices in the Supreme Tribunal, saying that "No nos vamos a quedar con esa, ahora lo que viene es un contraataque del pueblo y de las instituciones verdaderas, contraataque revolucionario" and that "Así que la AN que los nombró tiene que asumir su tarea, para evaluarlos y el que no tenga los requisitos habrá que sacarlo de allí".(We are not going to stay with that, now what is coming is a counterattack of the people and the real institutions, revolutionary counterattack" and that "So the AN that appointed them has to assume its task, to evaluate them and whoever does not have the requirements will have to be removed from there.)

The result was a new Supreme Tribunal of Justice Law with two purposes: establishing a procedure to suspend justices and increasing the number of justices from 20 to 30. The following year, the executive branch managed to promote the increase to 32 justices, after which the Tribunal started the reviewed the original sentence. On 14 March 2005, the Tribunal overruled the decision. The opposition considers that the override of the sentence was caused by the changes made to the high court by a legislation change by lawmakers of the ruling party, which had a majority at the time. Government supporters consider that the first sentence was political and there were several reasons to start a trial of a coup d'état.

=== 2006 judicial year beginning ===
During the 2006 judicial year beginning, the justices of the Supreme Tribunal stood up from the seats of the Criminal Chamber to chant "¡Uh, ah, Chávez no se va!" (English: "Uh, ah, Chávez won't go!"), while president Chávez was present in the auditorium. The act was interpreted as a demonstration of political partiality by the justices and the institution.

=== Open letter of former Justice Eladio Aponte Aponte ===
On 20 August 2009, drug trafficker Walid Makled was captured in Cúcuta by the Colombian Administrative Department of Security (DAS) and later moved to Bogotá. Walid was requested by both the American and the Venezuelan anti-narcotics authorities. During his arrest, Makled was found with a credential of the Venezuelan military prosecution, allegedly issued by the Supreme Tribunal justice Eladio Aponte Aponte. Venezuela's opposition's spokesperson, Miguel Ángel Rodríguez, declared that the investigation would be obstructed in the country by the very public officials.

On 16 April 2012, Aponte wrote an open letter from San José, Costa Rica, in which he claimed to have received orders and pressure from president Hugo Chávez to convict Iván Simonovis, security chief of the Metropolitan District of Caracas, as well as Caracas Metropolitan Police officers Henry Vivas and Lázaro Forero, applying the maximum sentence for their participation during the Llaguno Overpass events. The letter was published in September.

Aponte fled Venezuela to Costa Rica in April 2012 after being accused of assisting Makled who said he had been paying Aponte US$70,000 per month related to joint business ventures. Aponte then contacted the U.S. Drug Enforcement Administration which provided him with a flight to the United States.

=== 2015 justices appointment ===
As of 2017, for a part of Venezuelan society, the legitimacy of the Supreme Tribunal is in question, especially the legitimacy of its origin, due to the appointment on 23 December 2015 of 13 main justices and 21 supplementary justices by a lame duck National Assembly with a ruling party majority, as well as its actions since. Article 264 of the Venezuelan Constitution and Title V of the Supreme Tribunal of Justice Organic Law contemplate an extense procedure of more than thirty days for the appointment of the justices, both main and alternate, in which it is required to form a Judicial Nominations Committee integrated by members of the National Assembly and civil society, which will do a preselection of candidates that will be submitted to the Republican Moral Council: the Ombudsman, the Public Ministry and the Comptroller General, which will do a second preselection that in turn will be submitted to the National Assembly, which will have a lapse of three plenary sessions to appoint the justices with the vote of two thirds of the deputies or a fourth plenary session with the vote of a simple majority in case of not getting two thirds of the vote. The appointment of the justices was not done in accordance with the legal procedure, but with a hurried process carried out on 23 December 2015 by the lame duck National Assembly with a ruling party majority, when the legislature ended on 15 December, after being defeated on the 2015 parliamentary election, where the opposition, represented by the Democratic Unity Roundtable opposition coalition, gained 112 of the 167 seats.

During the process, the "Citizen branch" issued a list of preselected candidates of previous processes, endorsed by the Ombudsman Tarek William Saab and the Comptroller Manuel Galindo. The National Assembly approved the candidates in a single plenary session on the night of 23 December 2015.

Both the opposition and several jurists have described the appointment as illegal for not being performed according to the constitution and the Organic Law, including the challenges period, their lack of responses and the omission of the definite selections of the candidates. According to a mid 2016 report issued by the Venezuelan NGO Acceso a la Justicia (Access to Justice), only one of seven justices of the Constitutional Chamber comply with the requirements for the position demanded by Venezuelan laws and their designation process was irregular.

On 14 June 2016 the National Assembly nullified the appointment carried out in 2015.

=== Challenge of electoral results ===
Weeks after the parliamentary elections and after the oathtaking of the elected representatives in the National Assembly, seven complaints were presented to the electoral results to the Amazonas, Aragua and Yaracuy states, six of which were rejected and one was admitted, suspending the results of the Amazonas state circuits.

The Electoral Chamber of the Supreme Tribunal ordered the Assembly to disincorporate the deputies from Amazonas, but the Assembly, presided by Henry Ramos Allup, disobeyed responding that the deputies already had parliamentary immunity; The Attorney General, Luisa Ortega Díaz, later assured that the National Assembly was not in contempt, since contempt could only be applied to individuals and not institutions.

After this, deputy Héctor Rodríguez, from the Great Patriotic Pole coalition, introduced an appeal to the TSJ on 7 January 2016 to declare null all of the acts of the National Assembly. On 11 January, the Tribunal accepted the appeal and ruled in favor of it, declaring without effect all of the acts of the National Assembly "while it stayed in contempt"

With each action of the National Assembly now in hands of the opposition, the ruling party introduced appeals to annul such actions, and through numerous sentences the Tribunal started limiting the Assembly actions established in the constitution, while at the same time it exercised actions constitutionally exclusive to the parliament with the justification of "legislative omission" due to the "contempt" of the Assembly.

Starting 2017, in an ordinary plenary session, the National Assembly, then presided over by Julio Borges, officially disincorporated the three contested deputies, complying with the condition of the Supreme Tribunal to end the "contempt". However, the Supreme Tribunal did not withdraw the contempt arguing that the previous directive, presided by Ramos Allup, was the one that should have done the procedure.

=== 2017 constitutional crisis ===
==== Rulings 155 and 156 ====
On 27 March 2017, in sentence 155, the Tribunal granted faculties of the National Assembly to Nicolás Maduro to legislate and "take the civilian, military, economic, criminal, administrative, political, juridic and social measures considered necessary to prevent a state of conmotion...". On 29 March, the Tribunal published a second sentence, 156, attributed to itself the constitutional functions of the Assembly and decided on delegating them on the organisms that is considered pertinent, on the pretext of "legislative omission" of the Assembly. The sentence was met with both domestic and international alarm from different personalities and institutions, some of which defined sentence 156 as a self-coup d'état. This included Attorney General Luisa Ortega Díaz, who during a press conferenced in the seat of the Public Ministry defined both sentences as a "rupture of the constitutional order".

Maduro qualified the Attorney's declarations as a "impasse" between the Public Ministry and the Tribunal, as the reason why the same day he convened a Nation Defense Council to discuss the review of sentences 155 and 156. The following day, the Tribunal published clarifications on the sentences where the measures that transferred the parliament competences to the Tribunal and Maduro were partially suppressed. Jurists defined the clarifications as illegal, since the Constitutional Chamber cannot make a review of the sentences for being res judicata (claim preclusion).

On 1 May 2017, Maduro convenes a Constituent National Assembly based on a disputed interpretation of Articles 347, 348 and 349 of the constitution. Such call was met with preoccupation again, and many jurists argued that Maduro violated the constitution by assuming functions of the citizens to summon a Constituent Assembly.

On 17 May, the Tribunal decided on five nullity complaints from 2010 against the Reform of the Organic Law of Municipal Public Power, which replaced the Parochial Meetings with Communal Parochial Meetings. The Tribunal decided that communal councils could elect the members of the Parochial Meetings, implementing an indirect suffrage. The sentence has been qualified as a grave violation of the direct, universal and secret vote of Article 63 of the Constitution.

On 7 June 2017, the Constitutional Chamber issued sentence 378, where the Tribunal decided that the president is empowered to summon a Constituent Assembly without a previous consultative referendum. Once again the sentence was criticized for being considered violatory of the constitutional principles, specially sovereignty, since Article 5 of the constitution states that it "resides intransferibly in the people".

==== Helicopter attack ====
Venezuela's protesters set fire to the executive directorate of the judiciary of the Supreme Court in the Chacao municipality on 12 June 2017. Violence broke out in protests at the Supreme Court over a bid to change the Constitution. On 27 June 2017, a helicopter attacked the TSJ building with gunfire and grenades.

==== Attorney General response ====
On 8 June, the Attorney General introduced an electoral contentious appeal in the Electoral Chamber Constituent Assembly, and invoking Article 333 of the constitution she invited the Venezuelans to adhere to the appeal with the purpose of stopping the Constituent Assembly and preserve the validity of the current constitution. The following day the surroundings of the Tribunals were blocked by security forces, impeding citizens from adhering to the appeal. On 12 June, the Tribunal declared inadmissible the appeal due to "inept pretensions accumulation".

In response to the rejection of the Tribunal, the Luisa Ortega challenged the appointment of the 13 main justices and 21 alternates for considering a lack of suitability and bias in their actions, as well as aggravating the crisis in the country. She also requested the challenged justices to refraining to learn about the cause of the challenge, in accordance of Articles 55, 56 and 57 of the Supreme Tribunal Organic Law. The Attorney General explained that during the appointment procedure of the justices, the Moral Council did not convene an extraordinary sessions to evaluate the candidacy conditions in compliance of Article 74 of the Supreme Tribunal Law, but rather the candidates expedients were submitted and later she was handed the act to be signed, which she refused to do for not convening the session. On the following day, Ombudsman Tarek William Saab published a document with the alleged signature of Luisa Ortega, arguing that she did sign the act. Afterwards, María José Marcano, former secretary of the Moral Council, accused William Saab of lying and presenting a forged document, since neither Luisa Ortega or she had signed the act, finding it being done illegally with political pressures.

On 14 June, the Tribunal once again dismissed the appeal, warning that:

cualquier comisión, artificio o acción que tenga el objeto de anular la designación de magistrados subvierte el procedimiento constitucional para remoción de magistrados del TSJ, y por lo tanto, es írrito y nulo de toda nulidad y carente de validez, existencia y eficacia jurídica; y quienes participen en ellos están sujetos a la responsabilidad penal, civil y administrativa que corresponda

Translation:

any commission, artifice or action that has the purpose of nullifying the appointment of magistrates subverts the constitutional procedure for the removal of magistrates from the TSJ, and therefore, is void and void of all nullity and lacking validity, existence and legal effectiveness; and those who participate in them are subject to the corresponding criminal, civil and administrative responsibility.

El 13 de junio la Fiscal solicitó al TSJ antejuicio de mérito contra 6 magistrados principales y 2 suplentes por conspiración para atentar contra la forma republicana de la nación, delito tipificado en el artículo 132 del Código Penal, al mismo tiempo que solicitó a los magistrados acusados inhibirse de conocer de la causa de conformidad con los artículos 55, 56 y 57 de la LOTSJ.

=== 2017 appointment and Supreme Tribunal of Justice in exile ===
The discontent with the Bolivarian government saw the opposition being elected to hold the majority in the National Assembly of Venezuela for the first time since 1999 following the 2015 Parliamentary Election. As a result of that election, the lame duck National Assembly consisting of Bolivarian officials filled the Supreme Tribunal of Justice with their allies.

Following months of unrest surrounding the recall referendum against President Maduro in 2016, on 29 March 2017 the Bolivarian Supreme Tribunal of Justice ruled that the National Assembly was "in a situation of contempt", because of the aforementioned rulings against the election of some of its members. It stripped the Assembly of legislative powers, and took those powers for itself; which meant that the Court would have been able to create laws. The court did not indicate if or when it might hand power back. As a result of the ruling, the 2017 Venezuelan protests began surrounding the constitutional crisis, with the Bolivarian Supreme Tribunal of Justice reversing its ruling on 1 April 2017.

After being stripped of power during the constitutional crisis and the call for a rewriting of the constitution by the Bolivarian government, opposition-led National Assembly of Venezuela created a Judicial Nominations Committee on 13 June 2017 to elect new members of the Supreme Tribunal of Justice. On 12 July 2017, Ombudsman Tarek Saab, head of the Moral Council of Venezuela, said that the call for new magistrates would not be officially recognized by the Bolivarian government and that the magistrates already appointed by the lame duck Bolivarian National Assembly would instead continue to be recognized. Despite the rejection of recognition by the Bolivarian government, the opposition-led National Assembly then voted 33 magistrates into office on 21 July 2017, separate from the Bolivarian government, forming the Supreme Tribunal of Justice in exile.

=== 2018 opposition parties prohibition in presidential election ===
On 23 January 2018, the Constituent National Assembly ordered the presidential elections should be scheduled in 2018 and before 30 April. Several Venezuelan NGOs, such as Foro Penal Venezolano, Súmate, Voto Joven, the Venezuelan Electoral Observatory and the Citizen Electoral Network, expressed their concern over the irregularities of the electoral schedule, including the lack of the Constituent Assembly's competencies to summon the elections, impeding participation of opposition political parties, and the lack of time for standard electoral functions. Because of this, the European Union, the Organization of American States and countries including Australia and the United States rejected the electoral process.

Two days later, on 25 January, the high court ordered the Electoral Council to exclude from the elections the Democratic Unity Roundtable, the most voted coalition in Venezuela's democratic history, arguing that in the coalition there were political parties that did not meet validation requirements.

=== 2018 Christmas party ===
In December 2018, videos and pictures were leaked showing a glamorous Christmas party that counted with an expensive feast, including French wine, taking place in the Supreme Tribunal seat. The images received considerable backlash from social networks, criticizing the costs of the party during the grave economic crisis in the country and the hypocrisy of the socialist regime.

=== Christian Zerpa defection ===
On 8 January 2019, Electoral Chamber justice Christian Zerpa defected and escaped to the United States, dissenting with the inauguration of Nicolás Maduro as president for a second period. From Orlando, Florida, Zerpa made a series of declarations that questioned the independence of powers and the transparency of the judiciary system in Venezuela. In an interview, Zerpa denounced that Cilia Flores handles the Venezuelan judiciary branch arbitrarily and that in 2015 he received a call from Flores telling him that he would be appointed as justice. He confessed that he was appointed as justice of the Supreme Tribunal in 2015 for always have been loyal to chavismo.

Among the declarations given, he affirmed that many of the court's decisions responded to orders from the ruling party, and stressed that Maikel Moreno, the current chief justice of the Supreme Tribunal, and Raúl Gorrín, president of the television channel Globovisión, are involved in corruption schemes.

== Chambers ==
The Supreme Tribunal is divided in six chambers or instances that divide the work depending on its competences, which are the following:

- Constitucional Chamber
- Politic-Administrative Chamber
- Electoral Chamber
- Civil Cassation Chamber
- Social Cassation Chamber
- Criminal Cassation Chamber

All of the chambers are part of the Plenary Chamber.

=== Constitutional Chamber ===
Year	Judges of the Constitucional Chamber						
2001	Iván Rincón Urdaneta	José Delgado Ocando (Retired)	Antonio García García (Retired)	Jesús Eduardo Cabrera (Retired)	Pedro Rondón Haaz (Retired)	*	
2002	Iván Rincón Urdaneta	José Delgado Ocando (Retired)	Antonio García García (Retired)	Jesús Eduardo Cabrera (Retired)	Pedro Rondón Haaz (Retired)	*	
2003	Iván Rincón Urdaneta	José Delgado Ocando (Retired)	Antonio García García (Retired)	Jesús Eduardo Cabrera (Retired)	Pedro Rondón Haaz (Retired)	*	
2004	Iván Rincón Urdaneta	José Delgado Ocando (Retired)	Antonio García García (Retired)	Jesús Eduardo Cabrera (Retired)	Pedro Rondón Haaz (Retired)	*	
2005	Iván Rincón Urdaneta	Francisco Carrasquero López	Antonio García García (Retired)	Jesús Eduardo Cabrera (Retired)	Pedro Rondón Haaz (Retired)	Luisa Estela Morales	Luis V. Velázquez (Dismissed)
2006	Marcos Tulio Dugarte Padrón	Francisco Carrasquero López	Carmen Zuleta	Jesús Eduardo Cabrera (Retired)	Pedro Rondón Haaz (Retired)	Luisa Estela Morales	Luis V. Velázquez (Dismissed)
2007	Marcos Tulio Dugarte Padrón	Francisco Carrasquero López	Carmen Zuleta	Jesús Eduardo Cabrera (Retired)	Pedro Rondón Haaz (Retired)	Luisa Estela Morales	Arcadio de Jesús Delgado Rosales
2008	Marcos Tulio Dugarte Padrón	Francisco Carrasquero López	Carmen Zuleta	Jesús Eduardo Cabrera (Retired)	Pedro Rondón Haaz (Retired)	Luisa Estela Morales	Arcadio de Jesús Delgado Rosales
2009	Marcos Tulio Dugarte Padrón	Francisco Carrasquero López	Carmen Zuleta	Juan José Mendoza Jover	Pedro Rondón Haaz (Retired)	Luisa Estela Morales	Arcadio de Jesús Delgado Rosales
2010	Marcos Tulio Dugarte Padrón	Francisco Carrasquero López	Carmen Zuleta	Juan José Mendoza Jover	Pedro Rondón Haaz (Retired)	Luisa Estela Morales	Arcadio de Jesús Delgado Rosales
2011	Marcos Tulio Dugarte Padrón	Francisco Carrasquero López	Carmen Zuleta	Juan José Mendoza Jover	Gladys Gutiérrez	Luisa Estela Morales	Arcadio de Jesús Delgado Rosales
2012	Marcos Tulio Dugarte Padrón	Francisco Carrasquero López	Carmen Zuleta	Juan José Mendoza Jover	Gladys Gutiérrez	Luisa Estela Morales	Arcadio de Jesús Delgado Rosales
2013	Marcos Tulio Dugarte Padrón	Francisco Carrasquero López	Carmen Zuleta	Juan José Mendoza Jover	Gladys Gutiérrez	Luisa Estela Morales	Arcadio de Jesús Delgado Rosales
2014	Marcos Tulio Dugarte Padrón	Francisco Carrasquero López	Carmen Zuleta	Juan José Mendoza Jover	Gladys Gutiérrez	Luisa Estela Morales	Arcadio de Jesús Delgado Rosales
2015	Marcos Tulio Dugarte Padrón	Francisco Carrasquero López	Carmen Zuleta	Juan José Mendoza Jover	Gladys Gutiérrez	Luisa Estela Morales	Arcadio de Jesús Delgado Rosales
2016	Calixto Ortega	Luis Damiani	Carmen Zuleta	Juan José Mendoza Jover	Gladys Gutiérrez	Lourdes Suárez	Arcadio de Jesús Delgado Rosales
2017	Calixto Ortega	Luis Damiani	Carmen Zuleta	Juan José Mendoza Jover	Gladys Gutiérrez	Lourdes Suárez	Arcadio de Jesús Delgado Rosales
2018	Calixto Ortega	Luis Damiani	Carmen Zuleta	Juan José Mendoza Jover	Gladys Gutiérrez	Lourdes Suárez	Arcadio de Jesús Delgado Rosales
2019	Calixto Ortega	Luis Damiani	Carmen Zuleta	Juan José Mendoza Jover	Gladys Gutiérrez	Lourdes Suárez	Arcadio de Jesús Delgado Rosales

*=Only 20 judges were chosen	Year within the regulatory period according to LOTSJ (12 years)	Alternate Judge (vacant seat)

=== Politic-Administrative Chamber ===
Year	Judges of the Politic-Administrative Chamber				
1999	Yolanda Jaimes Guerrero	Levis Ignacio Zerpa	Hadel Mostafá Paolini (Retired)	*	
2000	Yolanda Jaimes Guerrero	Levis Ignacio Zerpa	Hadel Mostafá Paolini (Retired)	*	
2001	Yolanda Jaimes Guerrero	Levis Ignacio Zerpa	Hadel Mostafá Paolini (Retired)	*	
2002	Yolanda Jaimes Guerrero	Levis Ignacio Zerpa	Hadel Mostafá Paolini (Retired)	*	
2003	Yolanda Jaimes Guerrero	Levis Ignacio Zerpa	Hadel Mostafá Paolini (Retired)	*	
2004	Yolanda Jaimes Guerrero	Levis Ignacio Zerpa	Hadel Mostafá Paolini (Retired)	*	
2005	Yolanda Jaimes Guerrero	Levis Ignacio Zerpa	Hadel Mostafá Paolini (Retired)	Evelyn Margarita Marrero Ortiz	Emiro Antonio García Rosas
2006	Yolanda Jaimes Guerrero	Levis Ignacio Zerpa	Hadel Mostafá Paolini (Retired)	Evelyn Margarita Marrero Ortiz	Emiro Antonio García Rosas
2007	Yolanda Jaimes Guerrero	Levis Ignacio Zerpa	Hadel Mostafá Paolini (Retired)	Evelyn Margarita Marrero Ortiz	Emiro Antonio García Rosas
2008	Yolanda Jaimes Guerrero	Levis Ignacio Zerpa	Hadel Mostafá Paolini (Retired)	Evelyn Margarita Marrero Ortiz	Emiro Antonio García Rosas
2009	Yolanda Jaimes Guerrero	Levis Ignacio Zerpa	Hadel Mostafá Paolini (Retired)	Evelyn Margarita Marrero Ortiz	Emiro Antonio García Rosas
2010	Yolanda Jaimes Guerrero	Levis Ignacio Zerpa	Trina Omaira Zurita (Deceased)	Evelyn Margarita Marrero Ortiz	Emiro Antonio García Rosas
2011	Yolanda Jaimes Guerrero	Levis Ignacio Zerpa	Trina Omaira Zurita (Deceased)	Evelyn Margarita Marrero Ortiz	Emiro Antonio García Rosas
2012	Yolanda Jaimes Guerrero	Levis Ignacio Zerpa	Trina Omaira Zurita (Deceased)	Evelyn Margarita Marrero Ortiz	Emiro Antonio García Rosas
2013	Emilio Ramos G.	Mónica Misticchio	María C. Ameliach	Evelyn Margarita Marrero Ortiz	Emiro Antonio García Rosas
2014	Emilio Ramos G.	Mónica Misticchio	María C. Ameliach	Evelyn Margarita Marrero Ortiz	Emiro Antonio García Rosas
2015	Inocencio Figueroa	Bárbara Gabriela César	María C. Ameliach	Evelyn Margarita Marrero Ortiz	Emiro Antonio García Rosas
2016	Inocencio Figueroa	Bárbara Gabriela César	María C. Ameliach	Marcos Medina	Eulalia Guerrero
2017	Inocencio Figueroa	Bárbara Gabriela César	María C. Ameliach	Marcos Medina	Eulalia Guerrero
2018	Inocencio Figueroa	Bárbara Gabriela César	María C. Ameliach	Marcos Medina	Eulalia Guerrero
2019	Inocencio Figueroa	Bárbara Gabriela César	María C. Ameliach	Marcos Medina	Eulalia Guerrero

*=Only 20 judges were chosen	Year within the regulatory period according to LOTSJ (12 years)	Alternate Judge (vacant seat)

=== Electoral Chamber ===
Year	Judges of the Electoral Chamber				
1999	Alberto Martini Urdaneta (Retired)	Rafael Ángel Hernández Uzcátegui (Retired)	Luis Martínez Hernández (Retired)	*	
2000	Alberto Martini Urdaneta (Retired)	Rafael Ángel Hernández Uzcátegui (Retired)	Luis Martínez Hernández (Retired)	*	
2001	Alberto Martini Urdaneta (Retired)	Rafael Ángel Hernández Uzcátegui (Retired)	Luis Martínez Hernández (Retired)	*	
2002	Alberto Martini Urdaneta (Retired)	Rafael Ángel Hernández Uzcátegui (Retired)	Luis Martínez Hernández (Retired)	*	
2003	Alberto Martini Urdaneta (Retired)	Rafael Ángel Hernández Uzcátegui (Retired)	Luis Martínez Hernández (Retired)	*	
2004	Alberto Martini Urdaneta (Retired)	Rafael Ángel Hernández Uzcátegui (Retired)	Luis Martínez Hernández (Retired)	*	
2005	Iván Vásquez	Fernando Ramón Vegas Torrealba	Luis Martínez Hernández (Retired)	Luis Alfredo Sucre Cuba (Retired)	Rafael Arístides Rengifo (Retired)
2006	Iván Vásquez	Fernando Ramón Vegas Torrealba	Luis Martínez Hernández (Retired)	Luis Alfredo Sucre Cuba (Retired)	Rafael Arístides Rengifo (Retired)
2007	Juan José Núñez Calderón	Fernando Ramón Vegas Torrealba	Luis Martínez Hernández (Retired)	Luis Alfredo Sucre Cuba (Retired)	Rafael Arístides Rengifo (Retired)
2008	Juan José Núñez Calderón	Fernando Ramón Vegas Torrealba	Luis Martínez Hernández (Retired)	Luis Alfredo Sucre Cuba (Retired)	Rafael Arístides Rengifo (Retired)
2009	Juan José Núñez Calderón	Fernando Ramón Vegas Torrealba	Luis Martínez Hernández (Retired)	Luis Alfredo Sucre Cuba (Retired)	Rafael Arístides Rengifo (Retired)
2010	Juan José Núñez Calderón	Fernando Ramón Vegas Torrealba	Luis Martínez Hernández (Retired)	Luis Alfredo Sucre Cuba (Retired)	Rafael Arístides Rengifo (Retired)
2011	Juan José Núñez Calderón	Fernando Ramón Vegas Torrealba	Malaquías Gil Rodríguez	Oscar León U. (Deceased)	Jhannett María Madriz Sotillo
2012	Juan José Núñez Calderón	Fernando Ramón Vegas Torrealba	Malaquías Gil Rodríguez	Oscar León U. (Deceased)	Jhannett María Madriz Sotillo
2013	Juan José Núñez Calderón	Fernando Ramón Vegas Torrealba	Malaquías Gil Rodríguez	Indira Alfonzo	Jhannett María Madriz Sotillo
2014	Juan José Núñez Calderón	Fernando Ramón Vegas Torrealba	Malaquías Gil Rodríguez	Indira Alfonzo	Jhannett María Madriz Sotillo
2015	Juan José Núñez Calderón	Fernando Ramón Vegas Torrealba	Malaquías Gil Rodríguez	Indira Alfonzo	Jhannett María Madriz Sotillo
2016	Fanny Márquez	Christian Tyrone Zerpa (Resigned)	Malaquías Gil Rodríguez	Indira Alfonzo	Jhannett María Madriz Sotillo
2017	Fanny Márquez	Christian Tyrone Zerpa (Resigned)	Malaquías Gil Rodríguez	Indira Alfonzo	Jhannett María Madriz Sotillo
2018	Fanny Márquez	Christian Tyrone Zerpa (Resigned)	Malaquías Gil Rodríguez	Indira Alfonzo	Jhannett María Madriz Sotillo
2019	Fanny Márquez	Grisel López	Malaquías Gil Rodríguez	Indira Alfonzo	Jhannett María Madriz Sotillo

*=Only 20 judges were chosen	Year within the regulatory period according to LOTSJ (12 years)	Alternate Judge (vacant seat)

=== Civil Cassation Chamber ===
Year	Judges of the Civil Cassation Chamber				
1999	Antonio Ramírez Jiménez	Franklin Arrieche (Dismissed)	Carlos Oberto Vélez	*	
2000	Antonio Ramírez Jiménez	Franklin Arrieche (Dismissed)	Carlos Oberto Vélez	*	
2001	Antonio Ramírez Jiménez	Franklin Arrieche (Dismissed)	Carlos Oberto Vélez	*	
2002	Antonio Ramírez Jiménez	Franklin Arrieche (Dismissed)	Carlos Oberto Vélez	*	
2003	Antonio Ramírez Jiménez	Franklin Arrieche (Dismissed)	Carlos Oberto Vélez	*	
2004	Antonio Ramírez Jiménez	Tulio Álvarez	Carlos Oberto Vélez	*	
2005	Antonio Ramírez Jiménez	Tulio Álvarez	Carlos Oberto Vélez	Yris Armenia Peña Espinoza	Luis Antonio Hernández Ortiz
2006	Antonio Ramírez Jiménez	Isbelia Pérez Velásquez	Carlos Oberto Vélez	Yris Armenia Peña Espinoza	Luis Antonio Hernández Ortiz
2007	Antonio Ramírez Jiménez	Isbelia Pérez Velásquez	Carlos Oberto Vélez	Yris Armenia Peña Espinoza	Luis Antonio Hernández Ortiz
2008	Antonio Ramírez Jiménez	Isbelia Pérez Velásquez	Carlos Oberto Vélez	Yris Armenia Peña Espinoza	Luis Antonio Hernández Ortiz
2009	Antonio Ramírez Jiménez	Isbelia Pérez Velásquez	Carlos Oberto Vélez	Yris Armenia Peña Espinoza	Luis Antonio Hernández Ortiz
2010	Antonio Ramírez Jiménez	Isbelia Pérez Velásquez	Carlos Oberto Vélez	Yris Armenia Peña Espinoza	Luis Antonio Hernández Ortiz
2011	Antonio Ramírez Jiménez	Isbelia Pérez Velásquez	Carlos Oberto Vélez	Yris Armenia Peña Espinoza	Luis Antonio Hernández Ortiz
2012	Antonio Ramírez Jiménez	Isbelia Pérez Velásquez	Carlos Oberto Vélez	Yris Armenia Peña Espinoza	Luis Antonio Hernández Ortiz
2013	Aurides M. Mora	Isbelia Pérez Velásquez	Ymaira Zapata L.	Yris Armenia Peña Espinoza	Luis Antonio Hernández Ortiz
2014	Aurides M. Mora	Isbelia Pérez Velásquez	Ymaira Zapata L.	Yris Armenia Peña Espinoza	Luis Antonio Hernández Ortiz
2015	Guillermo Blanco	Isbelia Pérez Velásquez	Marisela Godoy	Yris Armenia Peña Espinoza	Luis Antonio Hernández Ortiz
2016	Guillermo Blanco	Vilma Fernández	Marisela Godoy	Francisco Velásquez	Ivan Bastardo
2017	Guillermo Blanco	Vilma Fernández	Marisela Godoy	Francisco Velásquez	Ivan Bastardo
2018	Guillermo Blanco	Vilma Fernández	Marisela Godoy	Francisco Velásquez	Ivan Bastardo
2019	Guillermo Blanco	Vilma Fernández	Marisela Godoy	Francisco Velásquez	Ivan Bastardo

*=Only 20 judges were chosen	Year within the regulatory period according to LOTSJ (12 years)	Alternate Judge (vacant seat)

=== Social Cassation Chamber ===
Year	Judges of the Social Cassation Chamber				
1999	Omar Mora Díaz	Juan Rafael Perdomo	Alfonso Rafael Valbuena	*	
2000	Omar Mora Díaz	Juan Rafael Perdomo	Alfonso Rafael Valbuena	*	
2001	Omar Mora Díaz	Juan Rafael Perdomo	Alfonso Rafael Valbuena	*	
2002	Omar Mora Díaz	Juan Rafael Perdomo	Alfonso Rafael Valbuena	*	
2003	Omar Mora Díaz	Juan Rafael Perdomo	Alfonso Rafael Valbuena	*	
2004	Omar Mora Díaz	Juan Rafael Perdomo	Alfonso Rafael Valbuena	*	
2005	Omar Mora Díaz	Juan Rafael Perdomo	Alfonso Rafael Valbuena	Luis Eduardo Franceschi Gutiérrez	Carmen Elvigia Porras Escalante
2006	Omar Mora Díaz	Juan Rafael Perdomo	Alfonso Rafael Valbuena	Luis Eduardo Franceschi Gutiérrez	Carmen Elvigia Porras Escalante
2007	Omar Mora Díaz	Juan Rafael Perdomo	Alfonso Rafael Valbuena	Luis Eduardo Franceschi Gutiérrez	Carmen Elvigia Porras Escalante
2008	Omar Mora Díaz	Juan Rafael Perdomo	Alfonso Rafael Valbuena	Luis Eduardo Franceschi Gutiérrez	Carmen Elvigia Porras Escalante
2009	Omar Mora Díaz	Juan Rafael Perdomo	Alfonso Rafael Valbuena	Luis Eduardo Franceschi Gutiérrez	Carmen Elvigia Porras Escalante
2010	Omar Mora Díaz	Juan Rafael Perdomo	Alfonso Rafael Valbuena	Luis Eduardo Franceschi Gutiérrez	Carmen Elvigia Porras Escalante
2011	Omar Mora Díaz	Juan Rafael Perdomo	Alfonso Rafael Valbuena	Luis Eduardo Franceschi Gutiérrez	Carmen Elvigia Porras Escalante
2012	Omar Mora Díaz	Juan Rafael Perdomo	Alfonso Rafael Valbuena	Luis Eduardo Franceschi Gutiérrez	Carmen Elvigia Porras Escalante
2013	Octavio J. Sisco	Sonia C. Arias	Carmen E. Gómez	Luis Eduardo Franceschi Gutiérrez	Carmen Elvigia Porras Escalante
2014	Octavio J. Sisco	Sonia C. Arias	Carmen E. Gómez	Luis Eduardo Franceschi Gutiérrez	Carmen Elvigia Porras Escalante
2015	Edgar Gavidia Rodríguez	Mónica Gioconda Misticchio Tortorella	Marjorie Calderón	Danilo Mojica	Carmen Elvigia Porras Escalante
2016	Edgar Gavidia Rodríguez	Mónica Gioconda Misticchio Tortorella	Marjorie Calderón	Danilo Mojica	Jesús Manuel Jiménez Alonzo
2017	Edgar Gavidia Rodríguez	Mónica Gioconda Misticchio Tortorella	Marjorie Calderón	Danilo Mojica	Jesús Manuel Jiménez Alonzo
2018	Edgar Gavidia Rodríguez	Mónica Gioconda Misticchio Tortorella	Marjorie Calderón	Danilo Mojica	Jesús Manuel Jiménez Alonzo
2019	Edgar Gavidia Rodríguez	Mónica Gioconda Misticchio Tortorella	Marjorie Calderón	Danilo Mojica	Jesús Manuel Jiménez Alonzo

*=Only 20 judges were chosen	Year within the regulatory period according to LOTSJ (12 years)	Alternate Judge (vacant seat)

=== Criminal Cassation Chamber ===
Year	Judges of the Criminal Cassation Chamber				
1999	Rafael Pérez Perdomo (Retired)	Alejandro Angúlo Fontiveros (Retired)	Blanca Rosa Mármol de León	*	
2000	Rafael Pérez Perdomo (Retired)	Alejandro Angúlo Fontiveros (Retired)	Blanca Rosa Mármol de León	*	
2001	Rafael Pérez Perdomo (Retired)	Alejandro Angúlo Fontiveros (Retired)	Blanca Rosa Mármol de León	*	
2002	Rafael Pérez Perdomo (Retired)	Alejandro Angúlo Fontiveros (Retired)	Blanca Rosa Mármol de León	*	
2003	Rafael Pérez Perdomo (Retired)	Alejandro Angúlo Fontiveros (Retired)	Blanca Rosa Mármol de León	*	
2004	Julio Elías Mayaudón	Alejandro Angúlo Fontiveros (Retired)	Blanca Rosa Mármol de León	*	
2005	Julio Elías Mayaudón	Alejandro Angúlo Fontiveros (Retired)	Blanca Rosa Mármol de León	Deyanira Nieves Bastidas	Eladio Aponte Aponte (Dismissed)
2006	Héctor Manuel Coronado Flores	Alejandro Angúlo Fontiveros (Retired)	Blanca Rosa Mármol de León	Deyanira Nieves Bastidas	Eladio Aponte Aponte (Dismissed)
2007	Héctor Manuel Coronado Flores	Miriam del Valle Morandy	Blanca Rosa Mármol de León	Deyanira Nieves Bastidas	Eladio Aponte Aponte (Dismissed)
2008	Héctor Manuel Coronado Flores	Miriam del Valle Morandy	Blanca Rosa Mármol de León	Deyanira Nieves Bastidas	Eladio Aponte Aponte (Dismissed)
2009	Héctor Manuel Coronado Flores	Miriam del Valle Morandy	Blanca Rosa Mármol de León	Deyanira Nieves Bastidas	Eladio Aponte Aponte (Dismissed)
2010	Héctor Manuel Coronado Flores	Miriam del Valle Morandy	Blanca Rosa Mármol de León	Deyanira Nieves Bastidas	Eladio Aponte Aponte (Dismissed)
2011	Héctor Manuel Coronado Flores	Ninoska Queipo B. (Deceased)	Blanca Rosa Mármol de León	Deyanira Nieves Bastidas	Eladio Aponte Aponte (Dismissed)
2012	Héctor Manuel Coronado Flores	Ninoska Queipo B. (Deceased)	Blanca Rosa Mármol de León	Deyanira Nieves Bastidas	Eladio Aponte Aponte (Dismissed)
2013	Héctor Manuel Coronado Flores	Yanina B. Karabín	Úrsula M. Mujica	Deyanira Nieves Bastidas	Paúl José Aponte Rueda
2014	Héctor Manuel Coronado Flores	Yanina B. Karabín	Úrsula M. Mujica	Deyanira Nieves Bastidas	Paúl José Aponte Rueda
2015	Héctor Manuel Coronado Flores	Elsa Gómez	Maikel Moreno	Deyanira Nieves Bastidas	Francia Coello
2016	Juan Luis Ibarra	Elsa Gómez	Maikel Moreno	Yanina Karabín de Díaz	Francia Coello
2017	Juan Luis Ibarra	Elsa Gómez	Maikel Moreno	Yanina Karabín de Díaz	Francia Coello
2018	Juan Luis Ibarra	Elsa Gómez	Maikel Moreno	Yanina Karabín de Díaz	Francia Coello
2019	Juan Luis Ibarra	Elsa Gómez	Maikel Moreno	Yanina Karabín de Díaz	Francia Coello

*Only 20 judges were chosen	Year within the regulatory period according to LOTSJ (12 years)	Alternate Judge (vacant seat)

== Criticisms ==
Venezuela's judicial system has been deemed the most corrupt in the world by Transparency International in 2014. Human Rights Watch claimed that in 2004, President Hugo Chávez and his allies took over the Supreme Tribunal of Justice, filling it with his supporters and adding measures so the government could dismiss justices from the court. In 2010, legislators from Chávez's political party appointed nine permanent judges and 32 stand-ins, which included several allies. They claimed that some judges may face reprisals if they rule against government interests.

It has also been alleged that the Supreme Tribunal of Justice, with the majority supporting Chávez, elected officials to the supposedly non-partisan National Electoral Council of Venezuela, despite the 1999 Constitution empowering the National Assembly of Venezuela to perform that action. This resulted in Chavistas making up a majority of the electoral council's board.

After Chávez' death and with Nicolás Maduro as president, following the 2015 National Assembly election, the lame duck National Assembly, the majority of whom were Bolivarian supporters, filled the Supreme Tribunal of Justice with Maduro allies. The tribunal then quickly stripped three new opposition lawmakers of their National Assembly seats in early 2016, citing irregularities in their elections, thereby preventing an opposition supermajority which would have been able to challenge Maduro. The tribunal then approved several actions by Maduro and granted him more powers.

In 2024, BBC and El País described the court as partisan and controlled by the PSUV government of Nicolás Maduro.
