= Timeline of the 2014 Venezuelan protests =

The 2014 Venezuelan protests began in February 2014 when hundreds of thousands of Venezuelans protested due to high levels of criminal violence, inflation, and chronic scarcity of basic goods because of policies created the Venezuelan government. The protests have lasted for several months and events are listed below according to the month they had happened.

== Background ==
- 6 January – Miss Venezuela 2004 Mónica Spear and her ex-husband Thomas Henry Berry are killed just outside Valencia, Carabobo.
- 8 January – Protests begin after the killing of Monica Spear in the capital city of Caracas.
- 9 January – Seven suspects are arrested in the death of Monica Spear.
- 23 January – Opposition leaders Leopoldo López and María Corina Machado launch a campaign to remove Maduro from office, named La Salida (The Exit), with an intent to have President Maduro resign through protests with Machado publicly stating "We must create chaos in the streets through responsible civic struggle".

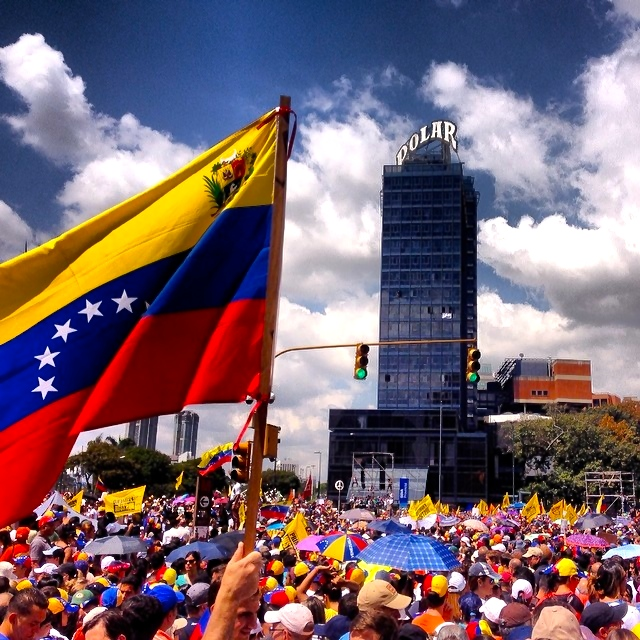
Peaceful demonstrations in Caracas on 12 February 2014.

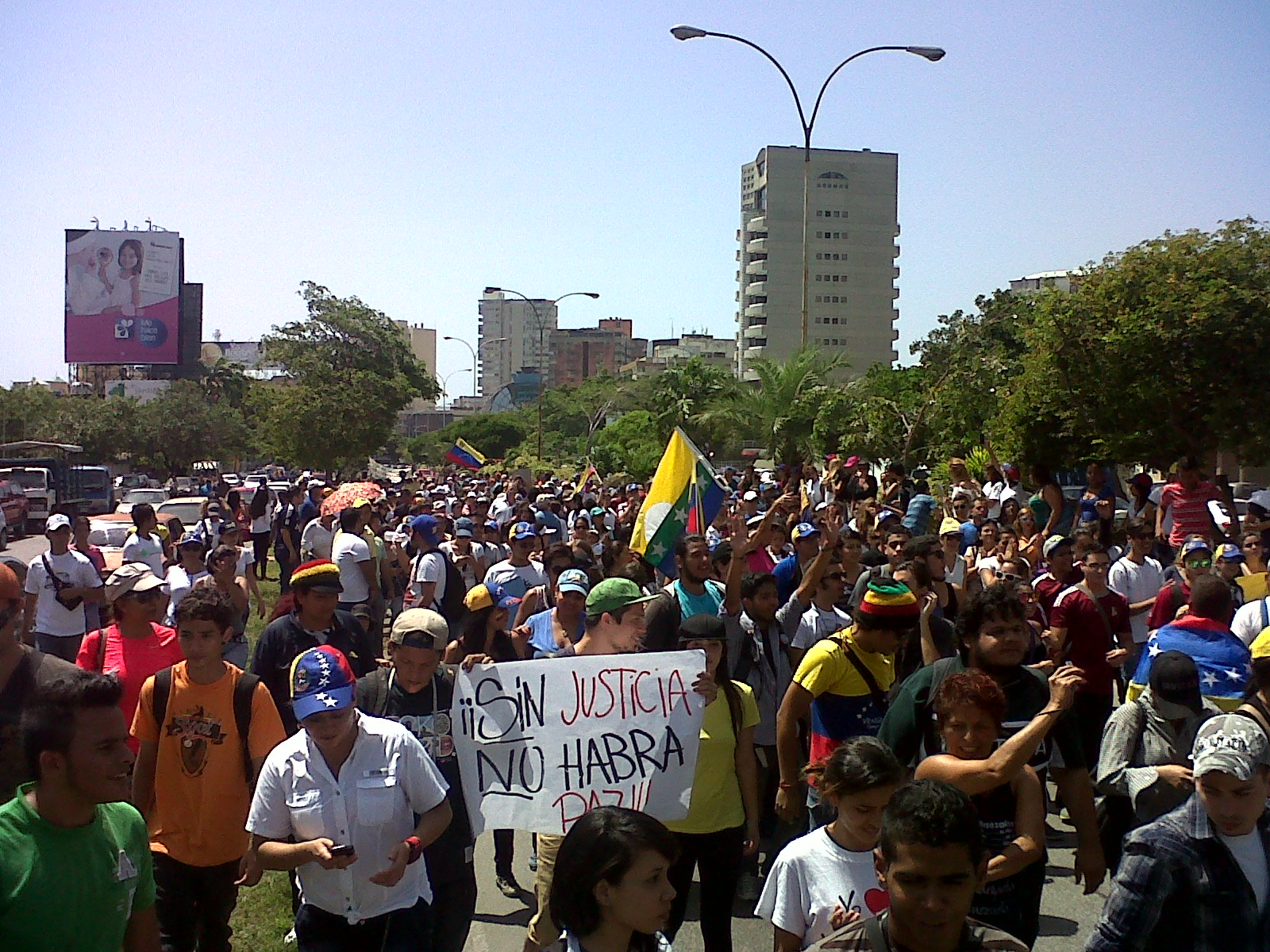
Anti-government demonstration on Margarita Island.

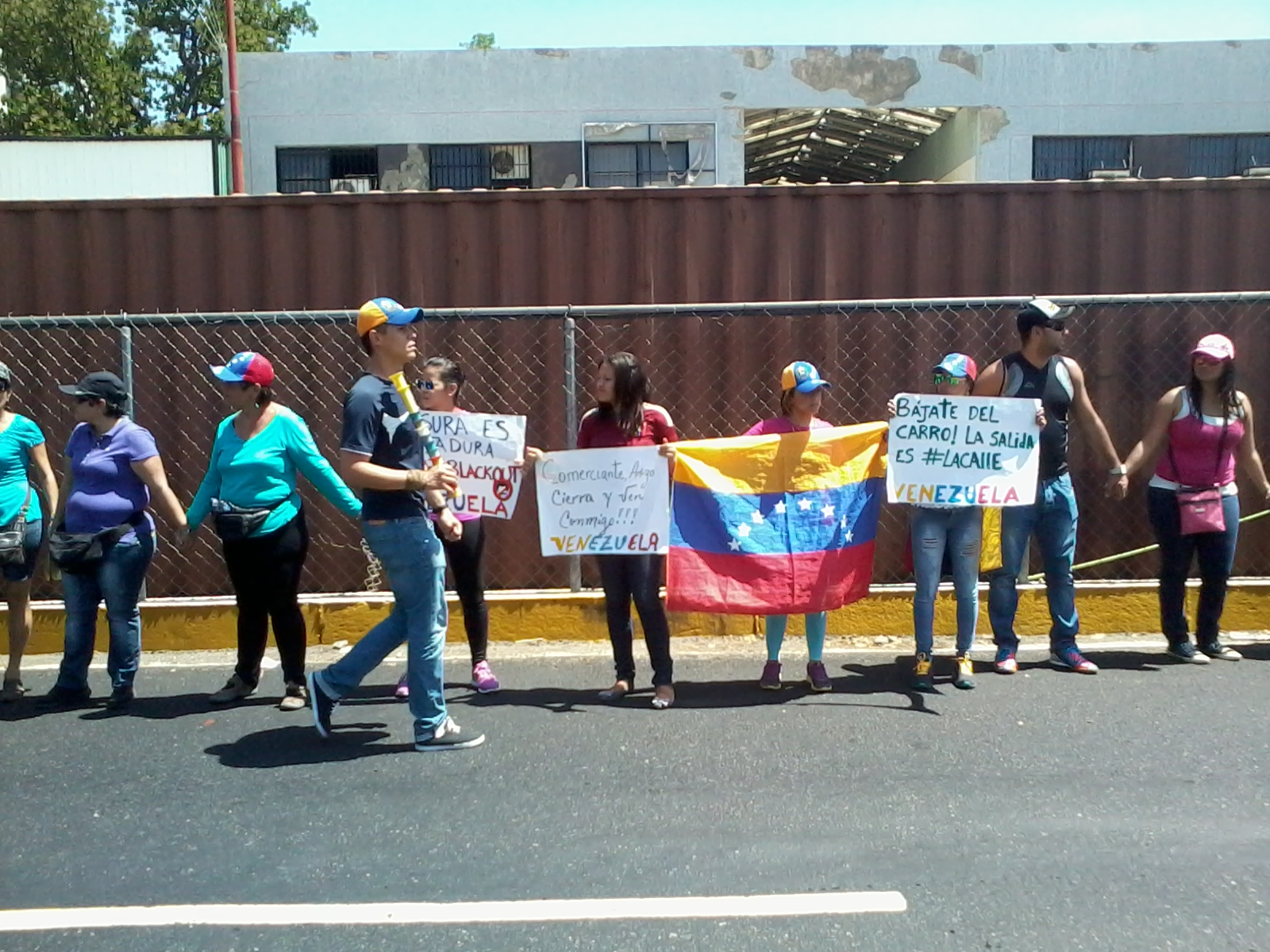
Human chain of protesters in Valencia

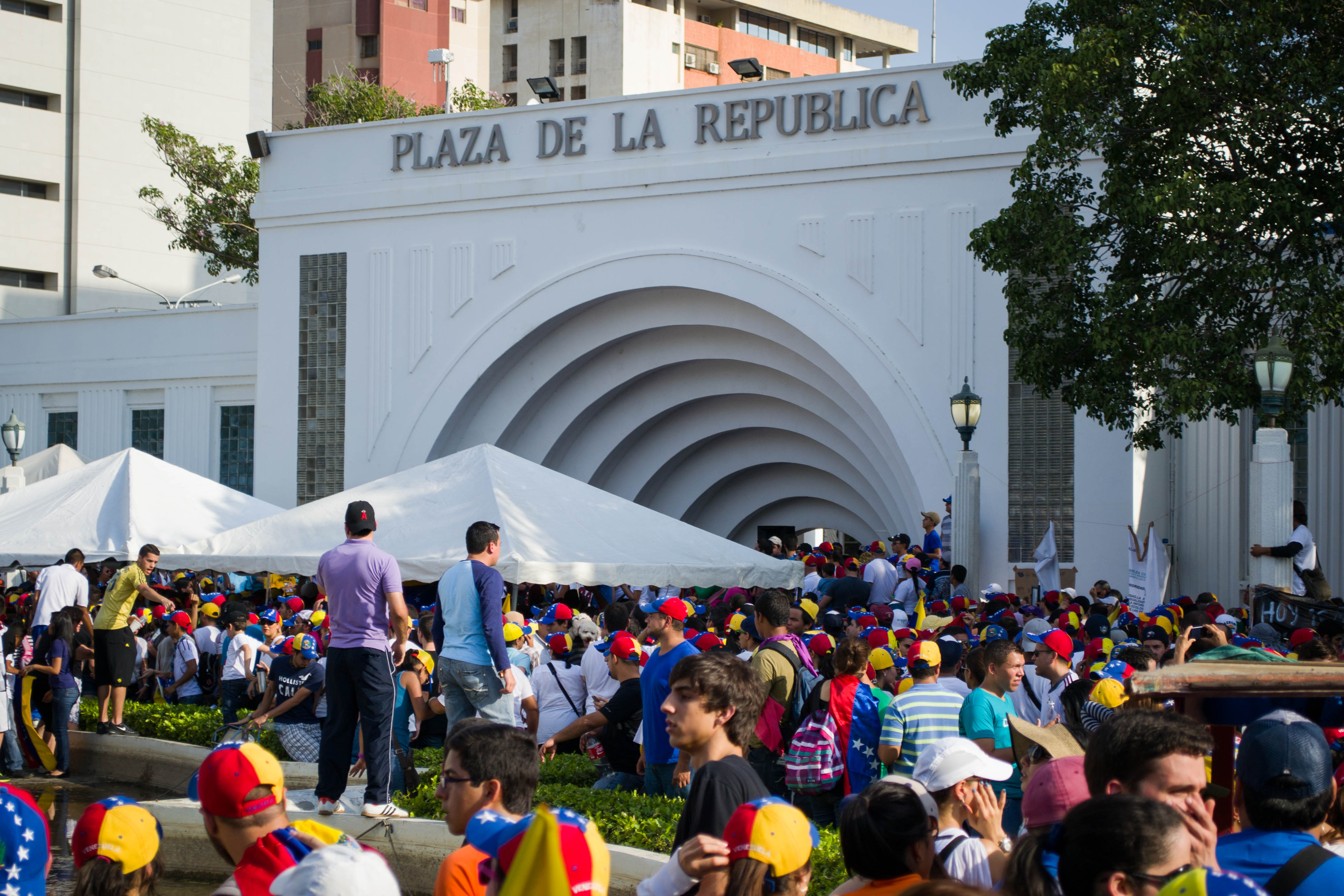
Protesters at Plaza de La República in Maracaibo on 16 February.

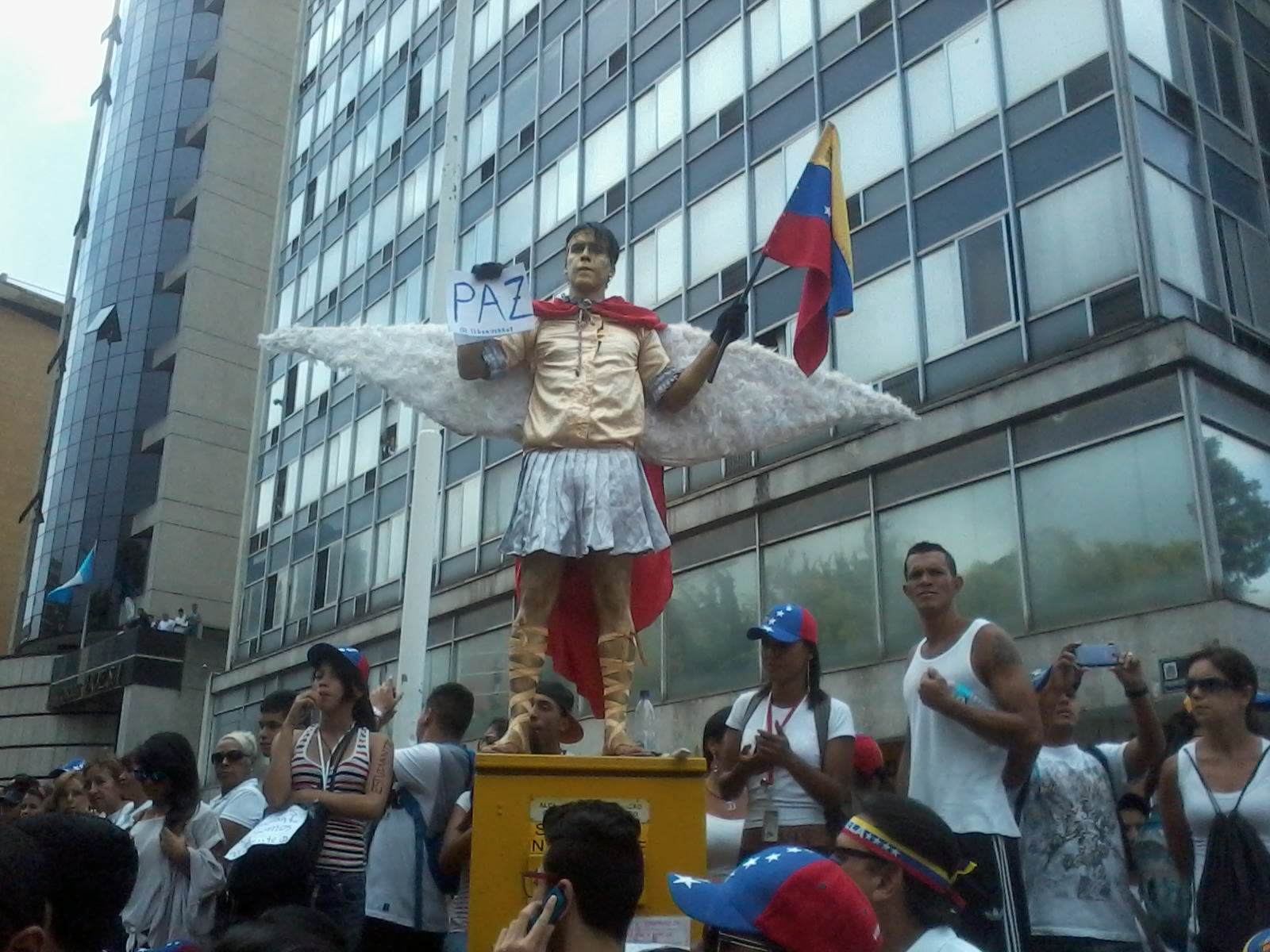
Protester holding a sign saying "Peace" and a Venezuelan flag.

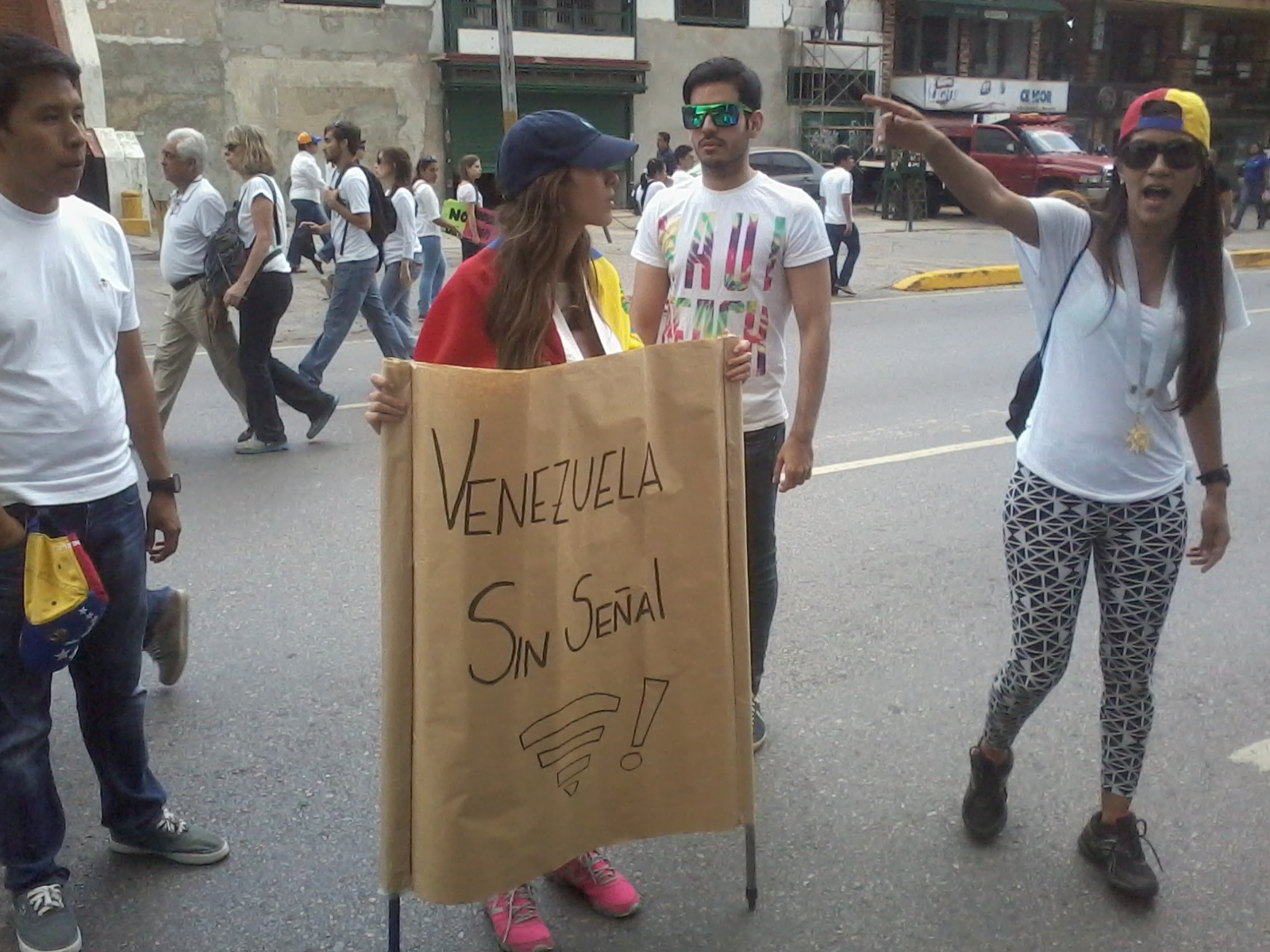
Protester with a sign against internet censorship.

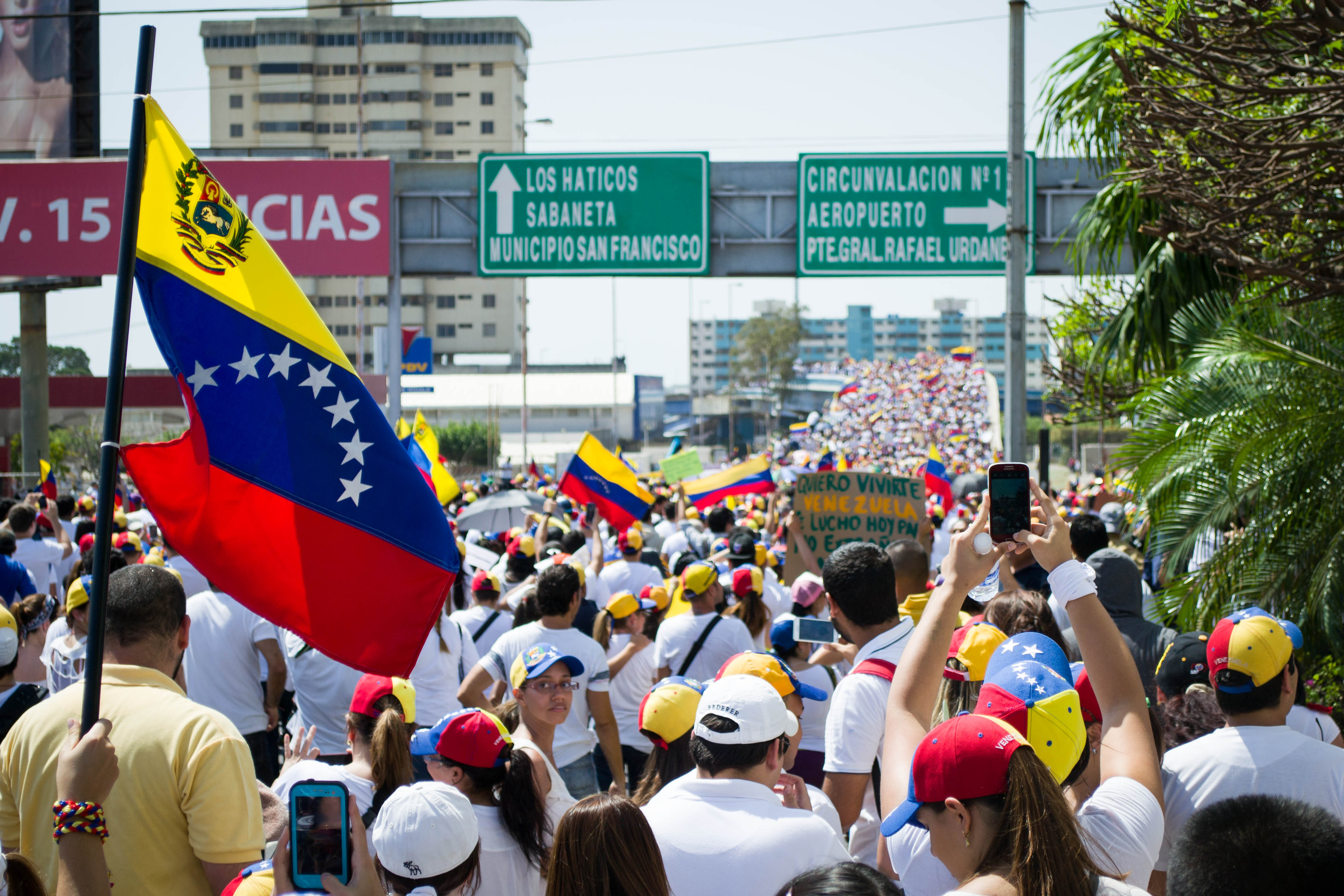
Thousands of opposition protesters outside of Palacio de Justicia in Maracaibo

- 1 February – Leopoldo López called upon students to protest peacefully against the scarcity, insecurity, and shortages.
- 2 February – Opposition leaders call for a march on 12 February for National Youth Day.
- 4 February – Protests at the University of the Andes occurred due to insecurity and an attempted sexual assault of a student.
- 5 February – Student protests at the Universidad Alejandro de Humboldt, where the principal avenues of Caracas were blocked alleging insecurity of the students during the night shift
- 6 February – Students at the Catholic University of Táchira protested and were accused of attacking a residence.
- 7 February – Medical students in Táchira continue to protest peacefully.
- 8 February – Students from the University of the Andes protested outside the headquarters of SEBIN where students were being held arrested.
- 9 February – Women dressed in black to protest against the arrests that happened in Tachira.
- 11 February – Students in Táchira, Zulia, Caracas and Coro protested for the release of fellow students.

== Events ==
=== February ===
- 12 February – Major opposition protests began with student marches led by opposition leaders in 38 cities across Venezuela simultaneous with the national celebrations for the bicentennial year anniversary of Youth Day and the Battle of La Victoria. After the protests, smaller groups remained and threw stones at government forces. The protests turned more violent after government security forces and "colectivos" allegedly used excessive force on protesters and supposedly shot at groups of unarmed people. Bassil Da Costa was the first protester to die after getting a bullet to the head. Later that day, another protester, Robert Reddman, and a pro-government activist were also killed in Caracas. President Maduro blamed "fascist" groups for the deaths caused that day, including opposition leader Leopoldo López, during his closing address in the Youth Day parade that evening in La Victoria, Aragua state. The Colombian news channel NTN24 was taken off the air by CONATEL (the Venezuelan government agency appointed for the regulation, supervision and control over telecommunications) for "promoting violence and unacknowledging authorities".
- 13 February – Following the death of a colectivo member Juan "Juancho" Montoya, members of colectivos "went on television to call for calm and called for the arrest of opposition leader Leopoldo Lopez. Judge Ralenys Tovar Guillén accepts the Public Ministry's petition to detain Leopoldo López in connection with the unrest that resulted in the death of the colectivo leader and two students. President Maduro organized pro-government demonstrations to counter the opposition and announced that violent anti-government protests are prohibited. Seven universities in Venezuela cancelled Youth Day programs due to the large involvement of student protesters. The governor of the Aragua state, Tarek El Aissami, denounced that opposition groups attempted to burn the governorate, attacked the Girardot Municipality town hall, burned a vehicle and wounded ten police officers the previous day. Likewise, The Minister of Ground Transport, Haiman El Troudi, denounced that the ministry headquarters were attacked during the night of the protests. According to Vielma Mora, there was an attempt to take over the electric substation Santa Teresa and destroy a sport school, and the front and a bus of the Bolivarian University of Venezuela were attacked in Táchira. In Valencia, protesters were dispersed by the National Guard in El Trigál where four students (three men and one woman) were attacked inside of a car while trying to leave the perimeter; the three men were imprisoned and one of them was allegedly sodomized by one of the officers with a rifle.
- 14 February – Students protested outside the Organization of American States in Venezuela asking them for action against the violence. The National Guard of Venezuela dispersed protesters with tear gas in Altamira. The Democratic Unity Roundtable and the Venezuelan Episcopal Conference (CEV) asked for the disarmament of the pro-government colectivos and armed groups The Foro Penal Venezolano (Venezuelan Penal Forum) denounced that the National Bolivarian Police (PNB) manipulated proofs about the use of firearms against protesters in Barquisimeto to avoid incrimination.
- 15 February – Chavistas protested at Plaza Venezuela in Caracas. A Globovisión reporter and her workmates denounced being attacked with stones in Plaza Venezuela and thanked those who were there that sympathized with her. Haiman El Troudi denounced that Caracas Metro workers were assaulted "with sticks and pipes", and that "damage and destruction" were produced in its facilities during the protests the 12 and 14 February. He also explained that 40 Metrobús units were stoned and now inoperative, and that escalators, train glasses, cameras, signals and fire systems were damaged. CONATEL's CEO, William Castillo, justified taking NTN24 off the air basing in the article 27 of the Law of Social Responsibility in Radio, Television and Electronic Media, which prohibits incitement of hatred, and expressed that he thinks that an "abuse" of the freedom of speech is exercised. According to him, CONATEL carried out a monitoring where "90% of NTN24's programmation was dedicated to Venezuela where the 80% was biased to one side of the conflict."
- 16 February – The Venezuelan Minister for Communication and Information, Delcy Rodríguez warned that the government will take legal action against international media "media manipulation". Rodriguez claimed that the social networks and national and international media have allegedly reported fake pictures that do not correspond to Venezuela. The Minister of Interior, Justice and Peace, Miguel Rodríguez Torres, assured having evidence that "proves that the protesters in Chacao are outside of the age range of a university student, and that they use very expensive motorcycles with an attire not peculiar of a middle or popular social class student. He accused Ramón Muchacho, the mayor of the Chacao municipality, of not assuming his responsibility for the security of the municipality. Henrique Capriles criticized the national government, considering them irresponsibles and affirming that "the civilians don't carry out coups", and asking where are the proofs (of this).
- 17 February – Armed government intelligence personnel illegally forced their way into the headquarters of Popular Will in Caracas and held individuals that were inside at gunpoint. About 300 opposition protesters gathered outside the headquarters to protest against the infiltration of the facility and are dispersed with tear gas.
- 18 February – Leopoldo López delivered a speech in Plaza Brión where he pointed out that its necessary to build "a pacific exit, inside the constitution but in the streets" and assured that "there isn't free media anymore to express themselves and if the media stays silent they must go to the streets". He declared that "if his imprisonment allows Venezuela to wake up definitely and for the Venezuelans that want a change, his imprisonment will be worth it." He turned himself to the National Guard at 12:24 pm, Venezuelan time, and said he was turning himself to a "corrupt justice". After Lopez turned himself in, the opposition protesters blocked the Francisco Fajardo Highway. Hundreds of his supporters gathered outside the Palacio de Justicia, protesting the fact that in their view Lopez will be judged by an unfair and corrupt justice system in a country where "there is no separation of powers". The opposition protesters were attacked outside the Palacio de Justicia by armed pro-government groups who beat them, threw objects at them from the building and tried to steal their cellphones. Amnesty International said the charges appeared to be politically motivated, and called for the release of López in the absence of evidence. Human Rights Watch said "The Venezuelan government has openly embraced the classic tactics of an authoritarian regime, jailing its opponents, muzzling the media, and intimidating civil society", saying that the Maduro government was blaming opposition leaders, including López, for violence. Some students and professors are arrested for allegedly setting fire to a PDVSA oil truck. Student protesters said they were forcibly removed by police from where they were concentrated for seven days in Maracay.
- 19 February – Miss Tourism Venezuela Génesis Carmona died after being shot in the head while supporting an opposition protest. Some protesters claim she was killed by a Chavista. Father Palmar, a Catholic priest and supporter of the protests in Zulia was attacked and injured by government forces during a peaceful demonstration. This happened a couple days after Father Palmar gave a speech against Maduro asking for his resignation and claiming that the Cuban G2 was responsible for influencing Maduro. The trial for Leopoldo Lopez was postponed again and moved to Ramo Verde military prison. That evening, a pro-government group known as "La Paz" was seen firing weapons at buildings without impediment from members of Bolivarian National Guard. Pro-government groups on motorcycles also attacked protesters in Sucre with stones and bottles with support from government security forces. After a group of citizens gathered in Caracas asking for no more deaths, groups of Chavistas and GNB responded violently shooting tear gas, buckshot, and shot a 37-year-old law student who was trying to mediate between protesters and the National Guard.
- 20 February – The removal of María Corina Machado's parliamentary immunity is requested in the National Assembly. The minister of Electric Energy, Jesse Chacón, denounced vandal acts to the property of the National Electric System in the Anzoátegui, Bolívar and Carabobo states. The charges of terrorism and homicide of Leopoldo López are suspended. In response to the death of Miss Tourism Venezuela Génesis Carmona, groups of women planned to defend the family of Génesis and protest her killing on 22 February. A citizen in the Mérida state dies after sustaining fatal wounds while crossing a barricade with barbed wire in a motorcycle with one of her children.
- 21 February – Venezuela closed its consulates in Aruba, Curaçao and Bonaire after an alleged attack by a Venezuelan citizen, said Venezuelan Foreign Minister Elias Jaua. A motorcycle rider died after tripping with a guaya (steel cable) placed near a barricade. The government accused the opposition students for the event.
- 22 February – A student protester, Geraldine Moreno, died in the hospital after sustaining wounds in the face caused by shotgun pellets when a member of the National Guard shot her at point blank range while she was protesting in the Tazajal sector, Carabobo state.

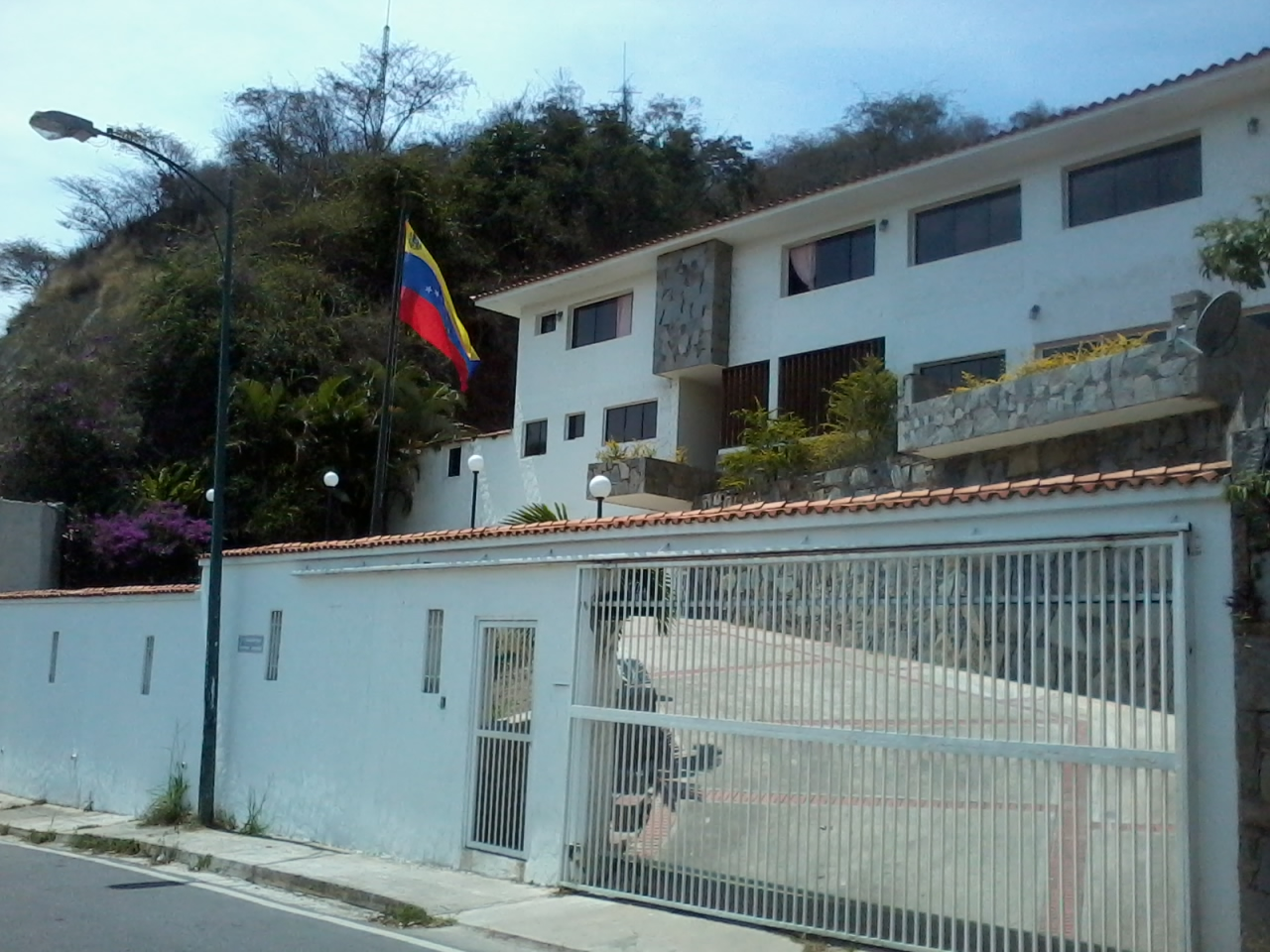
Home of former general Ángel Vivas.

- 23 February – Tens of thousands of protesters both supporting and opposing the government demonstrated in Caracas which led to some of the most serious clashes seen throughout the protests. About 30 military units arrived at the residence of retired brigadier general Ángel Vivas to arrest him. An engineer dies after being wounded two days ago during a protest in Caracas.
- 24 February – Opposition and government forces clashed in San Cristóbal, Táchira. Opposition protesters barricaded themselves and threw rocks and firebombs at the National Guard. The National Guard responded with tear gas and shotgun fire. One man was injured by shotgun fire and another was killed after the National Guard shot tear gas at him causing him to fall off a roof. The governor of Tachira, José Vielma Mora criticized the government saying, "I got angry because of the military planes overflying Táchira; it was an unacceptable excess" and pointed out to residents, "I am not part of the regime; I was elected by the people of Táchira".
- 25 February – A moto-taxi driver dies after being shot the previous day while attempting to remove debris placed by protesters in Maracaibo, Zulia state.
- 26 February – Lilian Tintori, wife of Leopoldo Lopez, led a quiet protest of women students just before a government peace conference. In Táchira, a group of protesters decapitated a statue of late president Hugo Chávez and posted the pictures on Twitter. The headquarters of the political party Democratic Action in San Cristóbal is looted. Its secretary general, Miguel Reyes, accused the governor Vielma Mora of the events and denounced that the police didn't act. The Government of Venezuela held a National Peace conference that was not attended by opposition figures because according to the opposition, "any talks must be predicated on an agenda agreed upon in advance and the participation of a third party".
- 27 February – Students led by Juan Requesens protested against violence, detention and torture of students and the shortages in Venezuela, with Herique Capriles visiting, but not as a spokesperson. The government issued an arrest warrant for Carlos Vecchio, a leader of Popular Will on various charges. Medics in Maracay, Aragua state, protest against the condition of the hospitals in the state. President Maduro decreed 27 February as "The Day of No Work in Venezuela" in respect for the fallen of the protests (that date was also the 25th anniversary of the historic Caracazo of 1989).

=== March ===
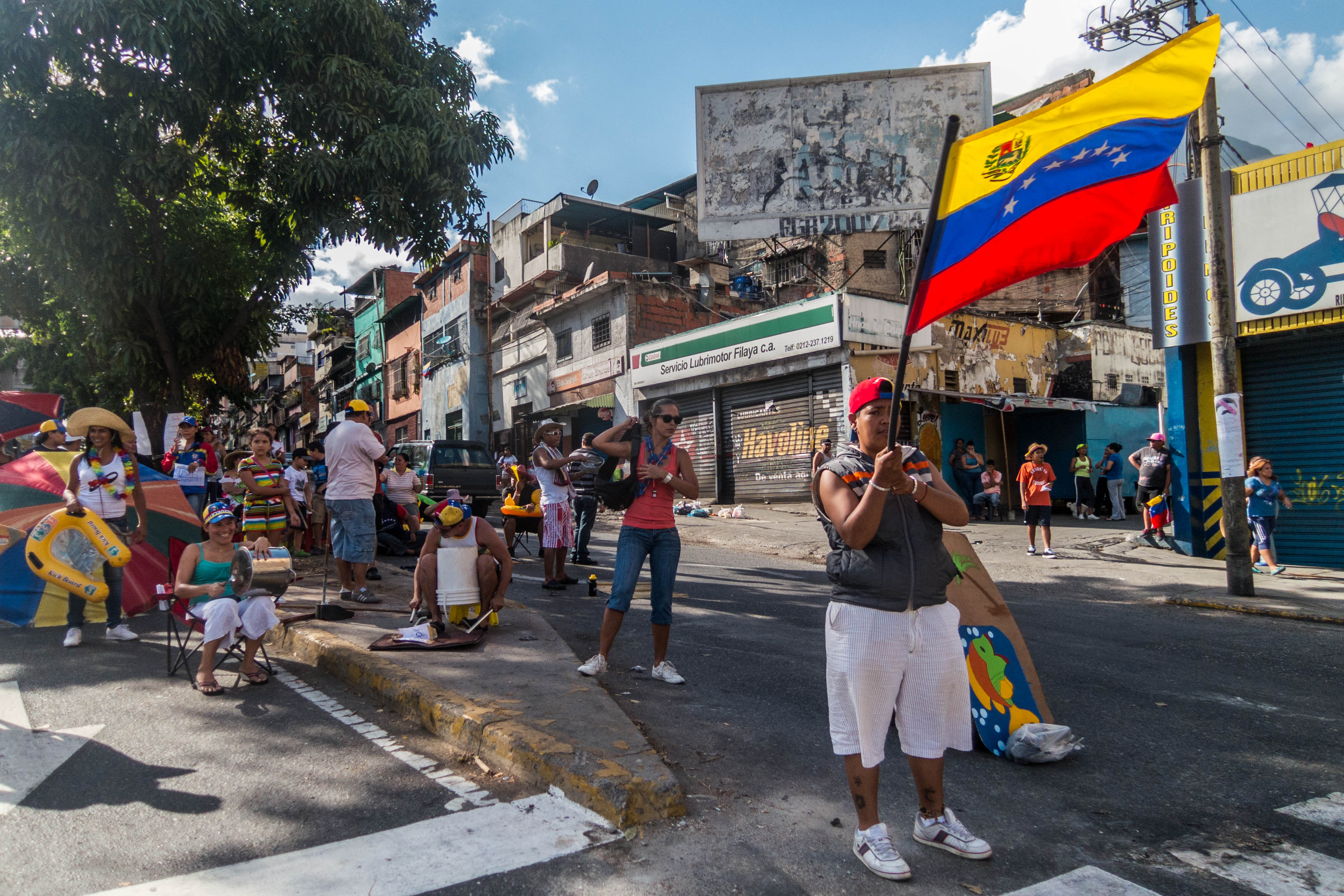
Protesters banging pots in a Cacerolazo protesting lengthened Carnaval celebrations.

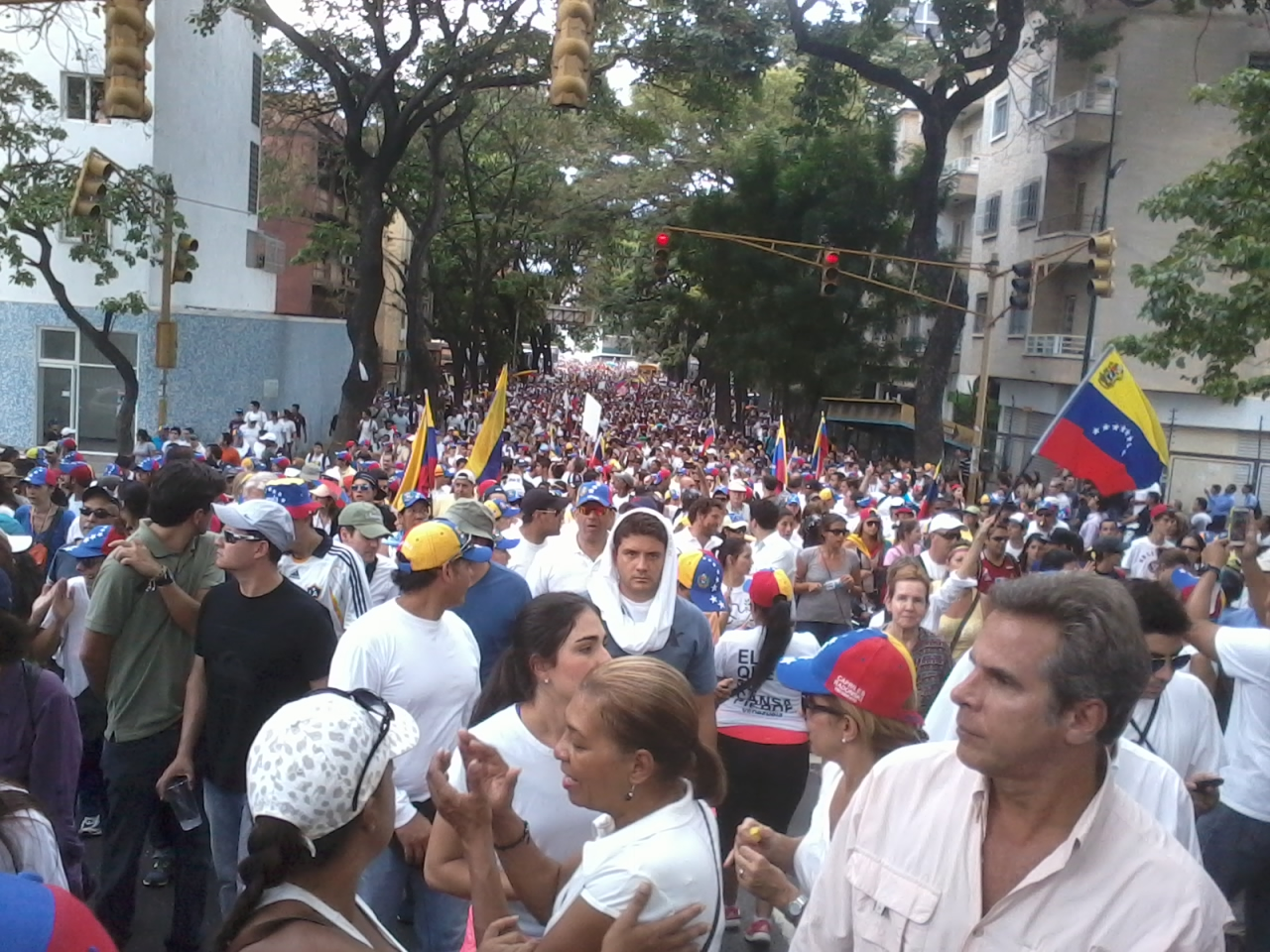
Demonstrators going to Central University of Venezuela to protest for the Ombudswoman's resignation.

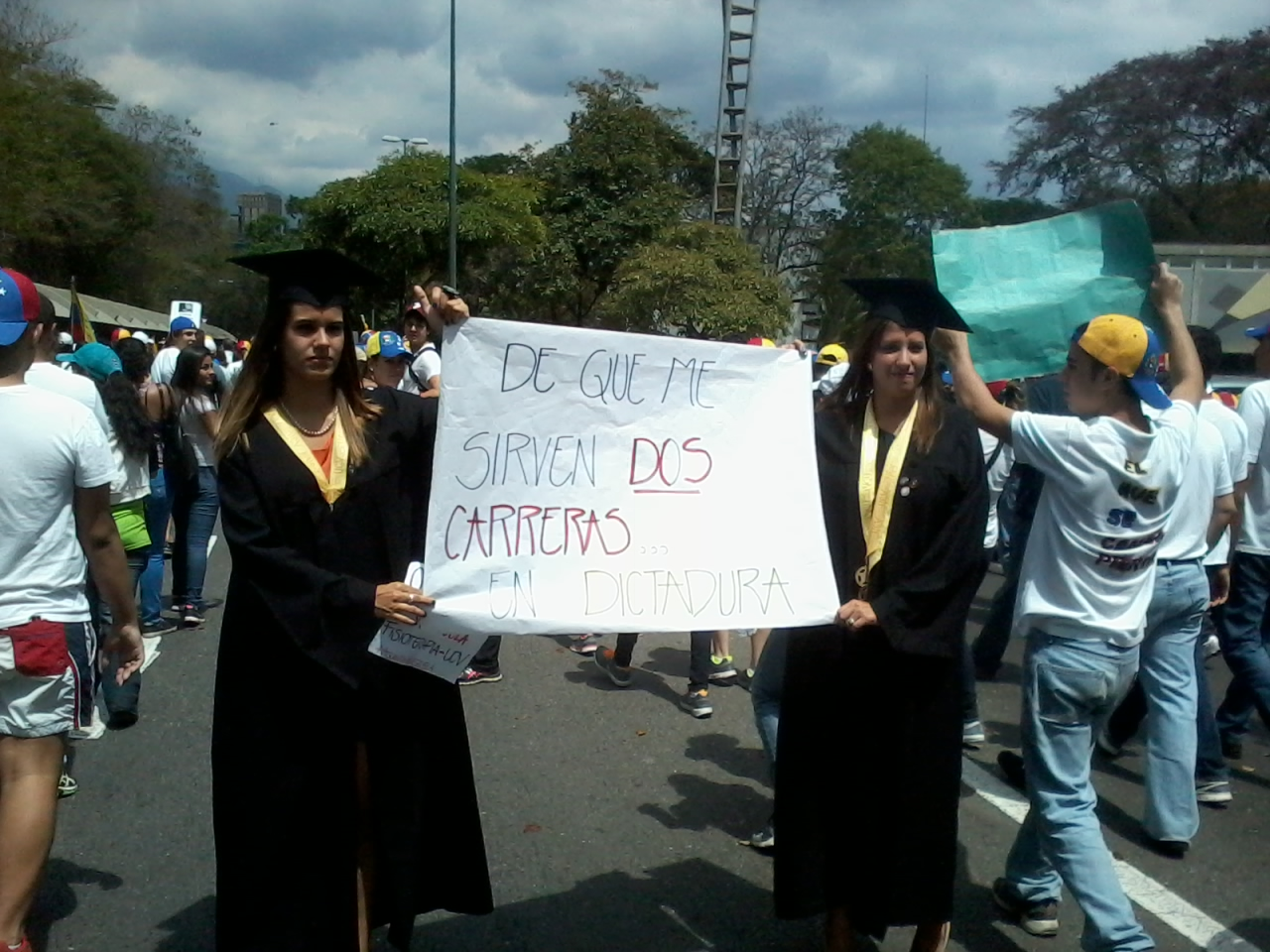
Graduates with a sign saying: "What use do I have of two careers in a dictatorship?".

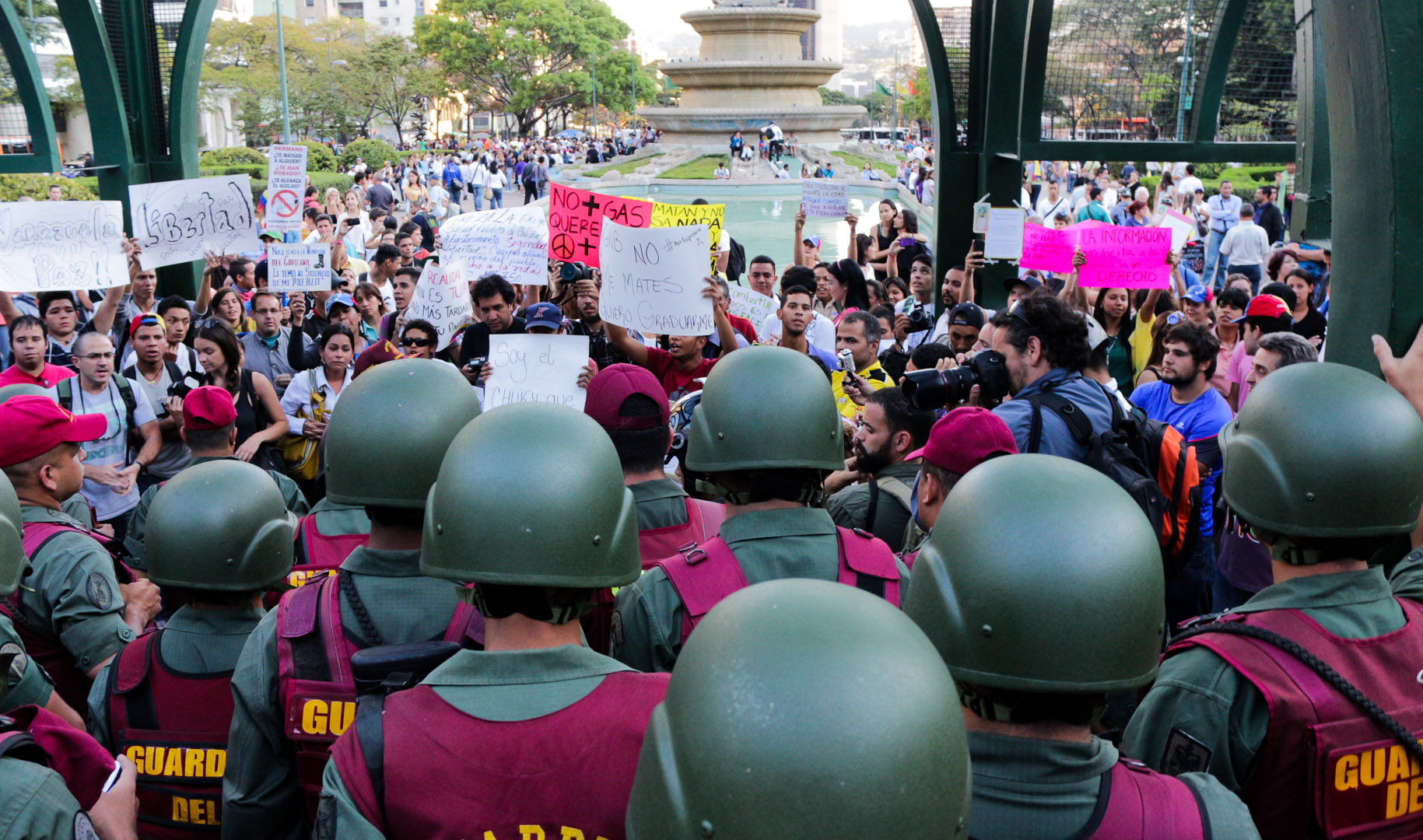
Protests in front of police at Altamira Square.

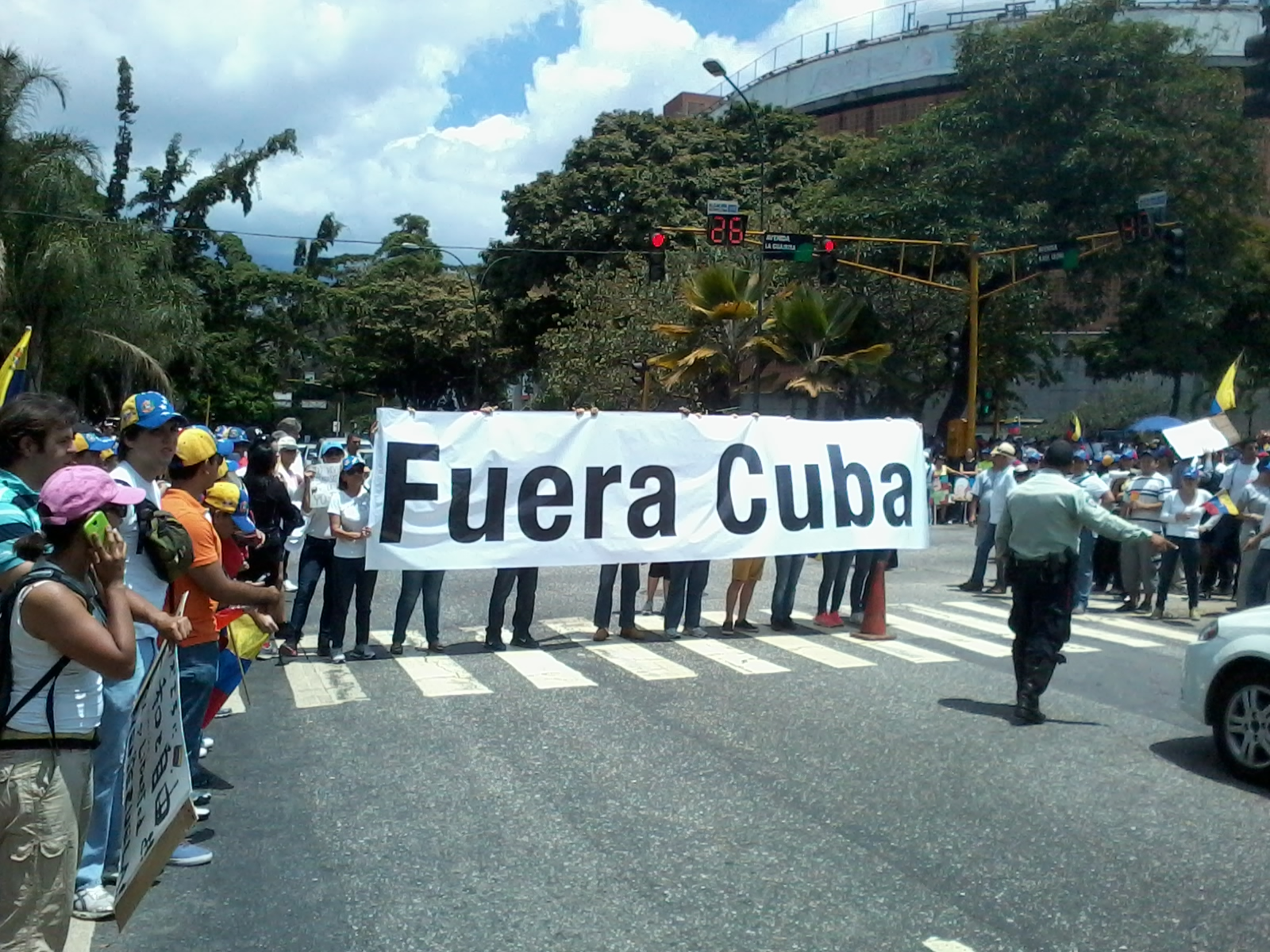
Opposition protesters holding a sign criticizing the alleged Cuban intervention in Venezuela saying "Cuba Out"

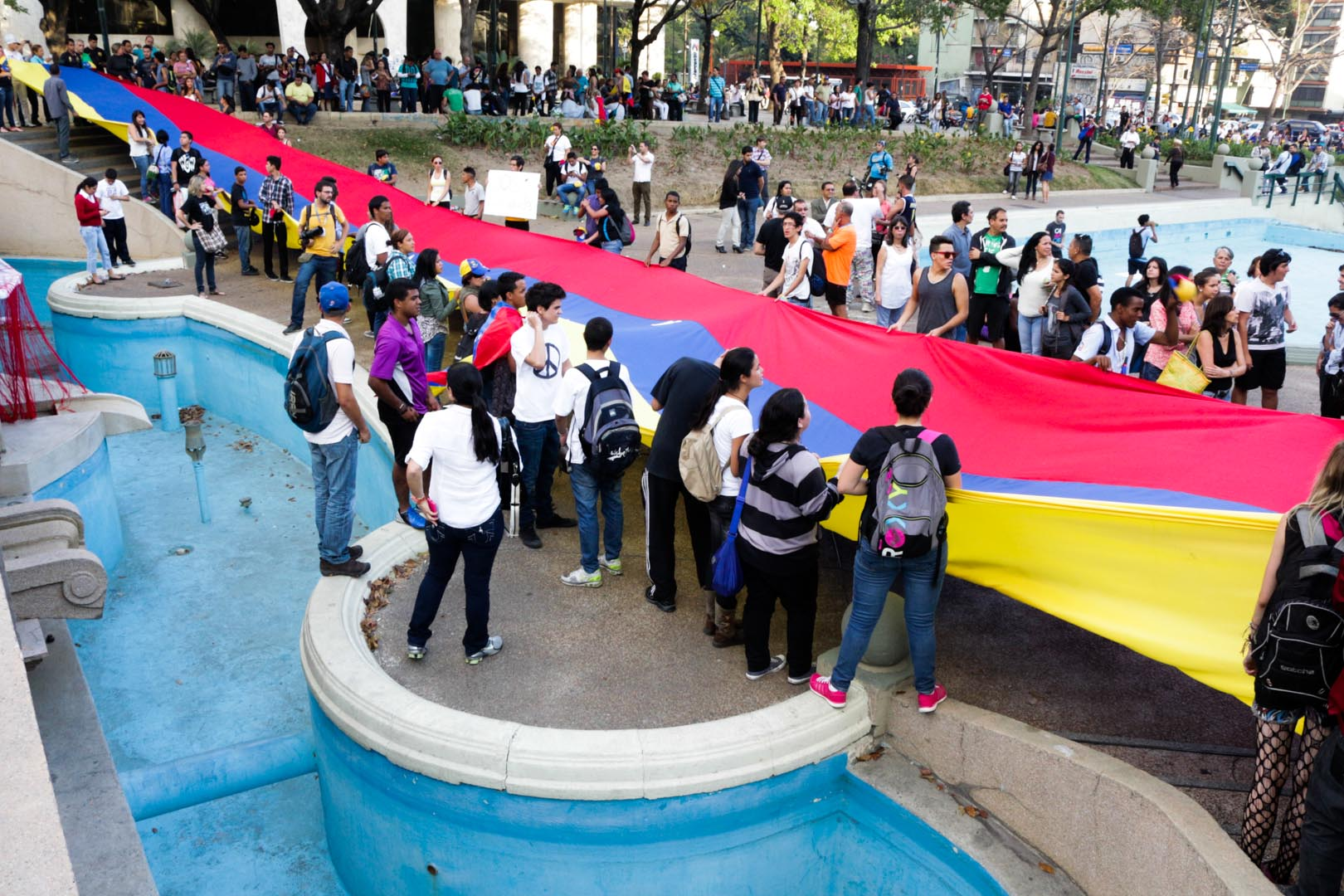
Opposition protesters with large Venezuelan flag at Altamira Square.

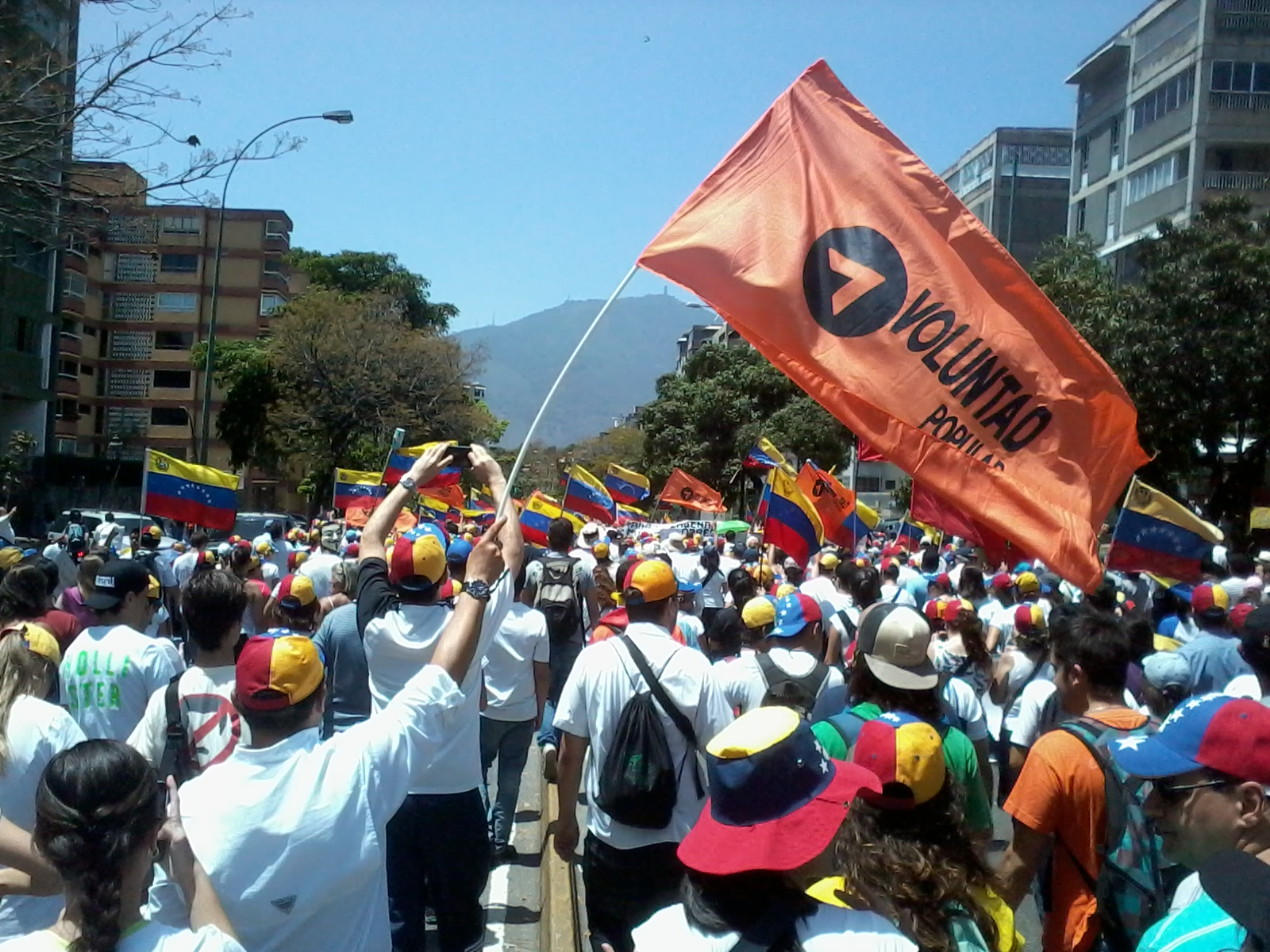
An opposition rally supporting Leopoldo López.

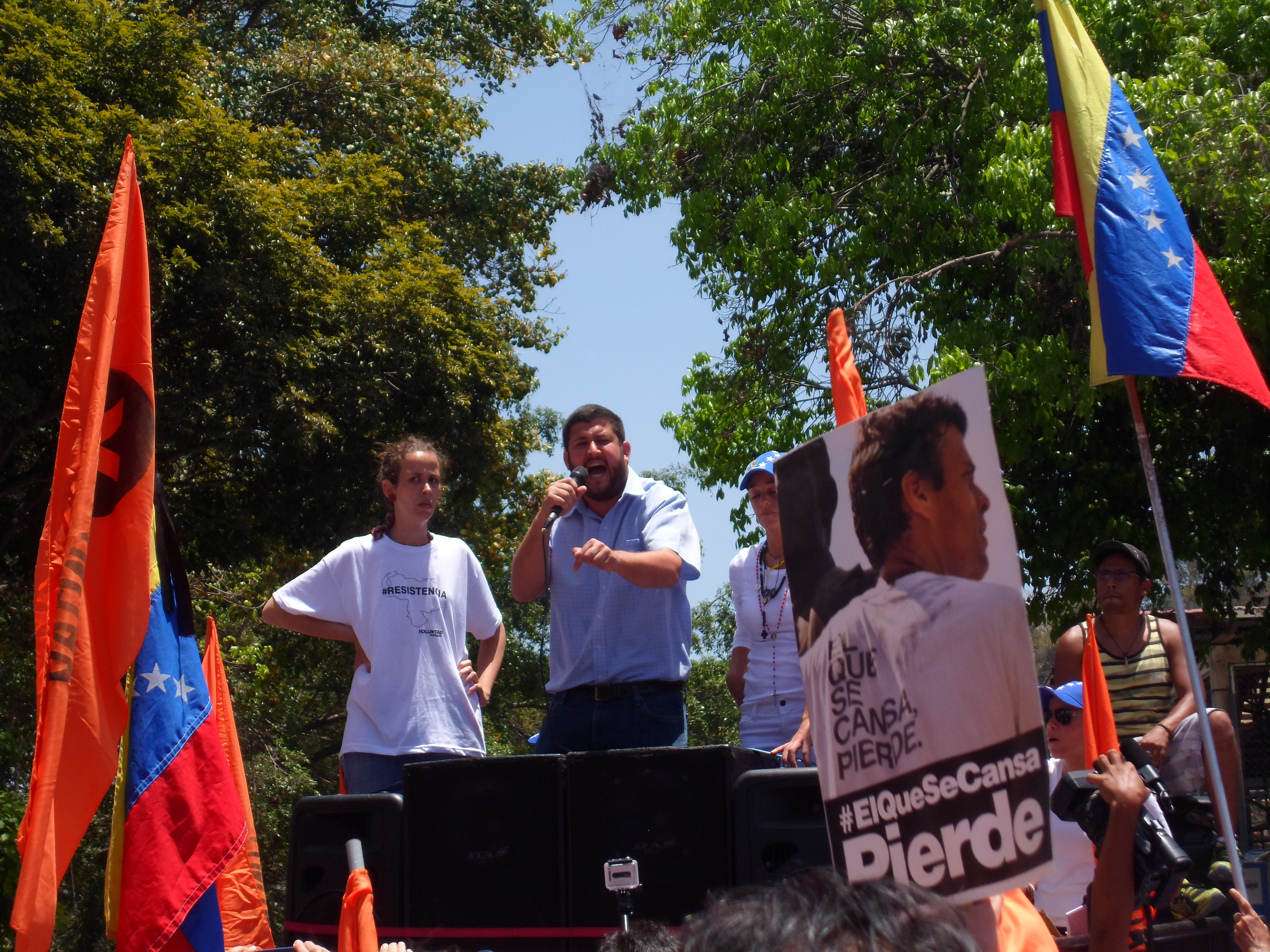
David Smolansky addressing to a rally supporting Leopoldo López.

- 1 March – Some cities such as El Tigre, Anaco, Tigrito, Píritu refused to celebrate Carnaval and protesters placed crosses representing those fallen during the protests on beaches popular during Carnaval, which had few visitors due to the protests. Carnaval celebrations in cities also had few attendees due to the protests with most of those at celebrations being police officers. The water in a fountain at Plaza Francia in Caracas was dyed red in protest of the deaths caused by violence. The Venezuelan Attorney General, Luisa Ortega Díaz, denied the opposition's claims of students being the main target of the Venezuelan government, when in fact they represent 35% of all detainees. She also stated that at least 27 government agents are being investigated for violations against human rights, plus another five accused of killing three people on the first day of protests. Meanwhile, President Maduro announced that a National Guard officer had died and another two had been wounded by sniper fire.
- 2 March – Tens of thousands of opposition protesters marched throughout Caracas protesting against censorship, shortages, insecurity and injustice. The National Guard used tear gas on protesters and played loud music to prevent them from being heard.
- 3 March – Citizens of Los Salias and Los Teques marched to Ramo Verde Prison to demand "justice and freedom" from the government.
- 4 March – Thousands of peaceful opposition protesters filled the streets of Caracas. The president of COPEI along with other citizens gathered in front of the United Nations in Chacao asking for the opposition to present their case to the United Nations and claimed that Elias Jaua is trying to conceal what is really happening in Venezuela.
- 5 March – Venezuela severed diplomatic relations with Panama as the nation honored President Chavez on the first anniversary of his death. President Maduro, in an address at the Montana Barracks in Caracas, accused Panama of pushing for regional organizations to intervene in Venezuela as it had asked the Organization of American States for an investigation into the protests. Hours after President Maduro called on the UBCH (Bolivar and Chavez Battle Units), the communal councils, communes, and colectivos during his speech; attacks on an apartment building by some groups who shot at residents and the National Guard who fired tear gas at the building resulted in two deaths in Los Ruices, including a National Guardsman. Members of the National Guard and "colectivos" both attacked peaceful protesters in Caracas with the mayor of the municipality Ramón Muchacho confirming this and denouncing the actions of the National Guard that caused damage saying, "We could see how a well-identified tank of the National Guard deliberately rammed a parked car on a street." Groups on motorcycles in Baruta also "intimidated" protesters and destroyed an opposition barricade. Popular Will denounced that its headquarters in Maracaibo, Zulia state, was hampered with large amounts of garbage and debris. In Punto Fijo, Falcón state, 26 students were detained during the protests; one of them was violently beaten, fracturing his ribcage.
- 6 March – The Venezuelan government took Panama off the list of exchanging currency on the CADIVI website supposedly due to the tense relations with the country. Mayor of Miranda Henrique Capriles said President Maduro's calling for groups on 5 March was "irresponsible" and said to listeners, "Do you think that will solve the economic problems killing each other? No.". In Caracas, a National Guardsman dies during the protests and a car is set on fire.
- 7 March – The Penal Court brought 40 complaints of alleged human rights violations that occurred on 12 February to the government. A statue of Hugo Chávez in Yaracuy was set on fire.
- 8 March – Economic ties between Venezuela and Panama have ceased due to political differences. In order to "crush speculators", President Maduro introduced a new "Cuban-like" rationing system to Venezuela; a system that has struggled in Cuba because "the products offered are not sufficient and families must resort to the black market to survive".
- 9 March – Bus routes from stations in Altamira, Caracas were suspended indefinitely due to protests possibly affecting 25,000 commuters. Groups of people gathered at Los Ruices and created a mural of white hand prints to show support to victims in Los Ruices of abuse and excessive force that occurred on 7 March. Gisela Rubilar Figueroa was fatally shot in the face while she and a group of people attempted to remove a roadblock in Mérida during a videotaped confrontation with anti-government protesters. Rubilar's home country Chile announced its own investigation.
- 10 March – Hundreds of doctors and medical students protested the conditions in hospitals and medicine shortages. During the demonstration, Deputy Minister of Health Juana Contreras was affected by tear gas that the National Police fired to disperse the doctors and had to be assisted by the protesting doctors. Police in Anzoátegui entered classrooms at Santa Maria University and attacked students and professors inside of classrooms. A fire occurred at the radio station of University of Los Andes. A student leader, Daniel Tinoco, was killed in San Cristóbal; possibly by "colectivos" or National Guard in the area.
- 11 March – In several places in Caracas, bags representing body bags were placed to raise awareness about high rates of violence and impunity in Venezuela. In a protest in the Universidad Centroccidental Lisandro Alvarado, in Barquisimeto, six persons are injured and many cars burned. Many students denounced the presence of the National Guard accompanied by armed groups inside the university campus. Government supporters led by deputy Nancy Ascencia assaulted deputy María Cortina Machado and the Guayana city bishop, monsignor Mariano Parra, in the Puerto Ordaz airport after Machado participated in many protests with Guyanese students and politicians.
- 12 March – The Caracas Metro closed seven stations due to safety concerns. UCV students (Central University of Venezuela in Spanish) and opposition protesters marched to Plaza Venezuela to demand Ombudswoman Gabriela Ramírez to resign. The police dispersed the protest with tear gas and water cannons. In Chacao, six tanks, two water cannon trucks and National Guardsmen with tear gas and buckshots dispersed protesters while playing audio of Hugo Chávez and audio of the National anthem of Cuba. NTN24 reported from a lawyer that National Guardsmen and individuals with "Cuban accents" in Mérida forced three arrested adolescents to confess to crimes they did not commit and then the adolescents "kneeled and were forced to raise their arms then shot with buckshot throughout their body" during an alleged "target practice". The governor of Carabobo state, Francisco Ameliach, reported that the National Guard captain, Ramos Ernesto Bracho Bravo, died after being shot in Valencia's highway. Two bystanders, one going to the store and one inside an apartment, were killed after being shot by several dozen colectivos on motorcycles who were attacking opposition protesters in Isabelica, Valencia. President Maduro denounced that violent groups of opposition protesters attacked the Britanic Tower in Altamira. The zone neighbors accused the destruction was caused by infiltrates who weren't detained by the authorities.
- 13 March – President Maduro said he will make announcements on how to "turn off" the "coup" and said "it is too late to sit down and talk with the MUD" and called Henrique Capriles "an incompetent bum" for his remarks.
- 14 March – Venezuelan Foreign Minister Elias Juaua accused United States Secretary of State John Kerry of being a murderer, saying that he "activated" violent acts in Venezuela.
- 15 March – President Maduro accused the United States of "seeking the overthrowing of his government". He also acknowledged that 1529 people were detained, stated that 558 of them were students, and that 105 protesters had been caught carrying firearms. Students of Simón Bolívar University placed 3,000 empty chairs with crosses placed upon them to symbolize the number of people murdered in Venezuela during the first few months of 2014.
- 16 March – Thousands of opposition protesters marched against the alleged intervention of Cuba within Venezuelan internal affairs with claims including Cuba's intervention within "administrative, financial and military" sectors of the Venezuelan government including the National Armed Forces. A Chilean journalist denounced he was assaulted by the National Guard while he was recording the protests and detentions at the Altamira Square
- 17 March – After the Minister of Interior, Justice and Peace Lieutenant General Miguel Rodríguez Torres announced the "liberation and pacification" of Altamira Square after days of protest actions, more than six hundred National Guardsmen were deployed in the district. The Association of University Teachers of the Central University of Venezuela (APUCV) voted for the removal of security forces with the president of APUCV saying, "The APUCV wants to make clear its demand to the federal government to respect the Constitution and stop segregating part of Venezuelan society to prevent the student mobilization to the Ombudsman to deliver a document" and that, "We denounce the presence not only of the repressive action of the security forces of the State, but the simultaneous presence of parallel and paramilitary organizations". The opposition deputy César Ramírez denounced that the police detained several students in de Caroní Municipality, Bolívar state. One of them, Bianca Rodríguez, was allegedly beaten, had her own excrements put into her mouth and threatened to be raped by the National Guard. A National Guard captain dies after being shot in the head in Maracay while on duty.
- 18 March – Groups of mothers gathered in Altamira Square and peacefully protested against the situation in Venezuela. Protesters marched to Ramo Verde prison one month after opposition leader Leopoldo López was arrested. During a press conference, President of the National Assembly Diosdado Cabello said that the government accused María Corina Machado of 29 counts of murder due to the deaths resulting from the protests. An 18 years old student dies in Táchira during a shooting, while many other protesters were injured. The National Experimental University of the Armed Forces (UNEFA) in San Cristobal, Táchira was attacked with molotov cocktails and largely destroyed. The dean blamed opposition protesters. Municipal services worker Francisco Rosendo Marín was shot in the head while clearing a barricade from a street in Caracas. Claims on social networks blame the attack on an armed group on motorcycles. Panama's ambassador to the OAS, Arturo Vallarino, anticipated in and interview with Voice of America to cede his seat in the Permanent Council of the organization to María Corina Machado to let her talk about the protests.
- 19 March – Mothers continued to peacefully protest chanting, "We want to free children" in Altamira Square. Students began to have a class in Altamira Square when a professor started teaching a math class to students in the area. In Rubio, president of the Municipal Council Rubio reported that about 150 protesters gathered and were shot at by National Guard that left bullet wounds and injuries that included two children of 1 and 3 years old respectively. A Services Corporation worker was killed while he was clearing a barricade in Caracas. Colectivos entered inside the Architecture and Urbanism Faculty of the CUV, beating students and damaging the facilities. The students were also robbed and had their clothing taken away. The university rector, Cecilia García Arocha, informed that the classes would be suspended temporally due to the recent violence. María Corina Machado travels to Washington to participate in the OAS session after accepting Panama's government offer to cede their seat in the organization.
- 20 March – Miguel Rodríguez Torres announced the demilitarization of the Altamira Square and that its responsibility was returned to the local area police "after the liberation of the public spaces". Opposition mayor Vicencio Scarano Spisso was tried and sentenced to ten and a half months of jail for failing to comply with a court order to take down barricades in his municipality which resulted in various deaths and injuries in the previous days. María Corina Machado responded to legal accusations made against her saying, "In a dictatorship, the weaker the regime is, the greater the repression". Deputy Dario Vivas said that once María Corina Machado returns to Venezuela from her meeting with the OAS, she will not have any immunity. President Nicolás Maduro gifted new cars to National Guardsmen for recognition of their services. National Guard officer Jhon Castillo was shot dead during a second attack on the National Experimental University of the Armed Forces.
- 21 March – The Permanent Council of the OAS stated its session to discuss the topic "Current situation and dialogue in Venezuela". Before beginning the intervention of María Corina, the Member States' representatives discuss if the meeting will be public of private after Nicaragua's delegate to the OAS, Ricardo Seintenfus, asked the meeting to be closed, followed by Venezuela's ambassador, Roy Chaderton, who asked voting for this initiative. With 22 votes in favor, 11 against and an abstention from Barbados, the Member States decided the meeting to be closed. The countries that voted for an open process to the press were Canada, Chile, Colombia, Costa Rica, Guatemala, Honduras, Mexico, Panama, Paraguay, Peru and United States. María Corina qualified the decision as "censorship". A group of Venezuelans protested in front of the seat of the OAS in Washington demanding transparency after the decision was taken. Henrique Capriles rejected the negative of the OAS to allow María Corina to discuss about the problems in Venezuela. The Ministry of Foreign Affairs sent a statement qualifying the decision as an "international victory against the coup". Adán Chávez, older brother of Hugo Chávez, has joined the government's effort of criticizing opposition mayors who have supported the protest actions, stating that they "could end up like Scarano and Ceballos" by being charged for various cases.
- 22 March – Thousands of opposition protesters demonstrated throughout Venezuela in the cities of Caracas, Mérida, Barquisimeto, San Cristóbal, Zulia, Cumaná, Valencia, Bolívar and Coro. Caracas had one of the largest demonstrations where thousands of opposition protesters gathered in a protest called "Por la Libertad". Both opposition and government supporters protests rallied in the capital city Caracas to protest for the release of political prisoners and against the alleged vandalism and destruction caused by opposition protesters respectively in their designated venues. María Corina Machado was arrested when she arrived at Maiquetia Airport but was later released. Argenis Hernandez died in hospital after being shot in the stomach in Valencia. A bus driver died after being shot by a group of hooded gunmen in San Cristóbal. Another protester was hit by a bullet in Mérida during a shoot out and died minutes after arriving at the hospital.
- 23 March – Protests inside of the Centro Comercial Galerías Mall in Maracaibo continued. A worker from the state-run Corpoelec shot at protesters injuring one woman and killing a pregnant reporter working for Venevision in Los Teques, Miranda state.
- 24 March – President Maduro blamed all the deaths during the protest on the "coup" attempt. A group of 70 young protesters set up tents near the entrance of the United Nations headquarters in Los Palos Grandes. Speaker Diosdado Cabello announced that María Corina Machado no longer has access to being in the National Assembly as a deputy, therefore expelling her in accordance with the Assembly rules and in compliance with articles 149 and 191 of the Constitution of Venezuela, which states that "public officials shall not be permitted to accept employment, honors or rewards from foreign governments without authorization from the National Assembly" and that "deputies of the National Assembly shall not be permitted to accept or hold public employment positions without giving up their investiture(…)". María Corina Machado said that she would be deputy as long as the people wanted her to be.
- 25 March – President Maduro announced that three Venezuelan Air Force generals were arrested for allegedly planning a "coup" against the government and supporting the protests, and will be charged accordingly. On the same day, Minister of the Interior, Justice and Peace Miguel Rodríguez Torres accused opposition mayor Daniel Ceballos of being financially backed by Colombia to conspire against Maduro's government and for using it to support the protests.
- 26 March – The New York Times published an op-ed by Leopoldo López under the headline "Venezuela's Failing State." where he explained he wrote, "from the Ramo Verde military prison outside Caracas," lamenting that for the past fifteen years, "the definition of 'intolerable' in this country has declined by degrees until, to our dismay, we found ourselves with one of the highest murder rates in the Western Hemisphere, a 57 percent inflation rate and a scarcity of basic goods unprecedented outside wartime." María Corina Machado arrived in Venezuela protected by three representatives of the Congress of the Republic of Peru, Martín Belaúnde, Luis Galarreta and Cecilia Chacón, with Galarreta saying, "We came to support María Corina Machado by this unusual and unacceptable arbitrariness that you want to do". President Maduro said that the United Socialist Party of Venezuela has already chosen candidates to possibly replace arrested officials through an election that he said "we will win".
- 27 March – In Sucre, groups of people protested due to a lack of water in the area. 225 military officers rejected the allegations against the three air force generals, saying that to bring them before a martial court "would be violating their constitutional rights, as it is essential first to submit a preliminary hearing" and asked the National Guard "to be limited to fulfill its functions under articles 320, 328 and 329 of the Constitution and cease their illegal repressive activities of public order" against the protest actions. Venezuelan Vice President Jorge Arreaza said that a national human rights council was created and "will receive all complaints of alleged assaults". In Maracaibo, colectivos attempted to rape individuals in an apartment complex without intervention from National Guardsmen stationed in the area.
- 28 March – Members of the Student Movement gathered at the Bello Monte morgue to recite Our Father in respect to the fallen. Protesters blocked traffic on Francisco de Miranda Avenue. Colectivos attacked the Popular Will headquarters in Maracaibo burning it.
- 29 March – Three protests took place in Caracas in the areas of Altamira, Los Cortijos and Las Mercedes. Protesters in Carabobo blocked Bolívar Avenue while demonstrating against the government. While protesting just outside Valencia in Carabobo, hundreds of protesters were shot at with buckshot and tear gas by police. Henrique Capriles criticized President Maduro saying that while Venezuelans die, the president "sleeps like a baby while everything happens", mocking a statement President Maduro said to CNN during an interview with Christiane Amanpour.
- 30 March – In San Cristóbal, tear gas engulfed the city where clashes between protesters and police took place since 4 am. María Corina Machado regretted the attacks from the previous night against residents in Tachira that had their homes allegedly attacked with gunfire, stones and tear gas by the National Guard and police.
- 31 March – Student protesters placed tents outside the entrance of the UN headquarters in Caracas asking why it has not given the country attention. Students of the Central University of Venezuela blocked the Francisco Fajardo Highway while protesting. Deputies and students called for a gathering the next day to accompany María Corina Machado to a National Assembly meeting.

=== April ===
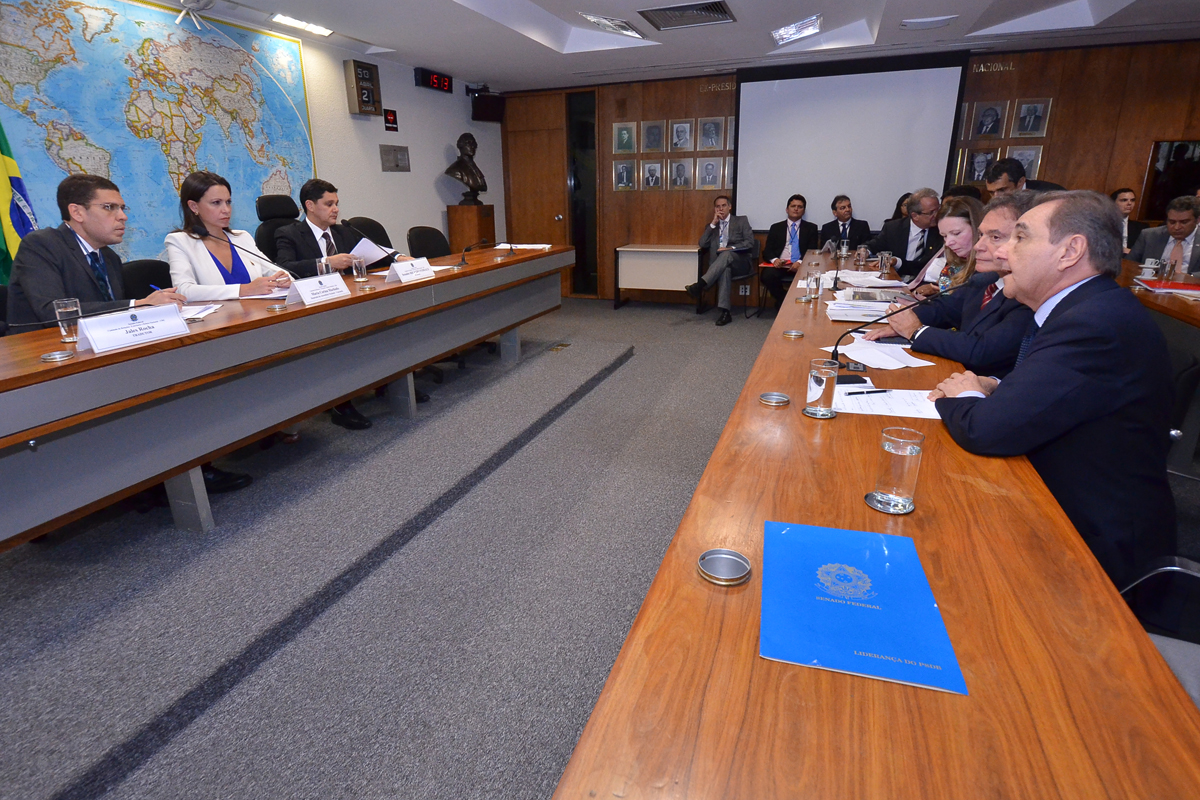
María Corina Machado speaking with the Brazilian government.

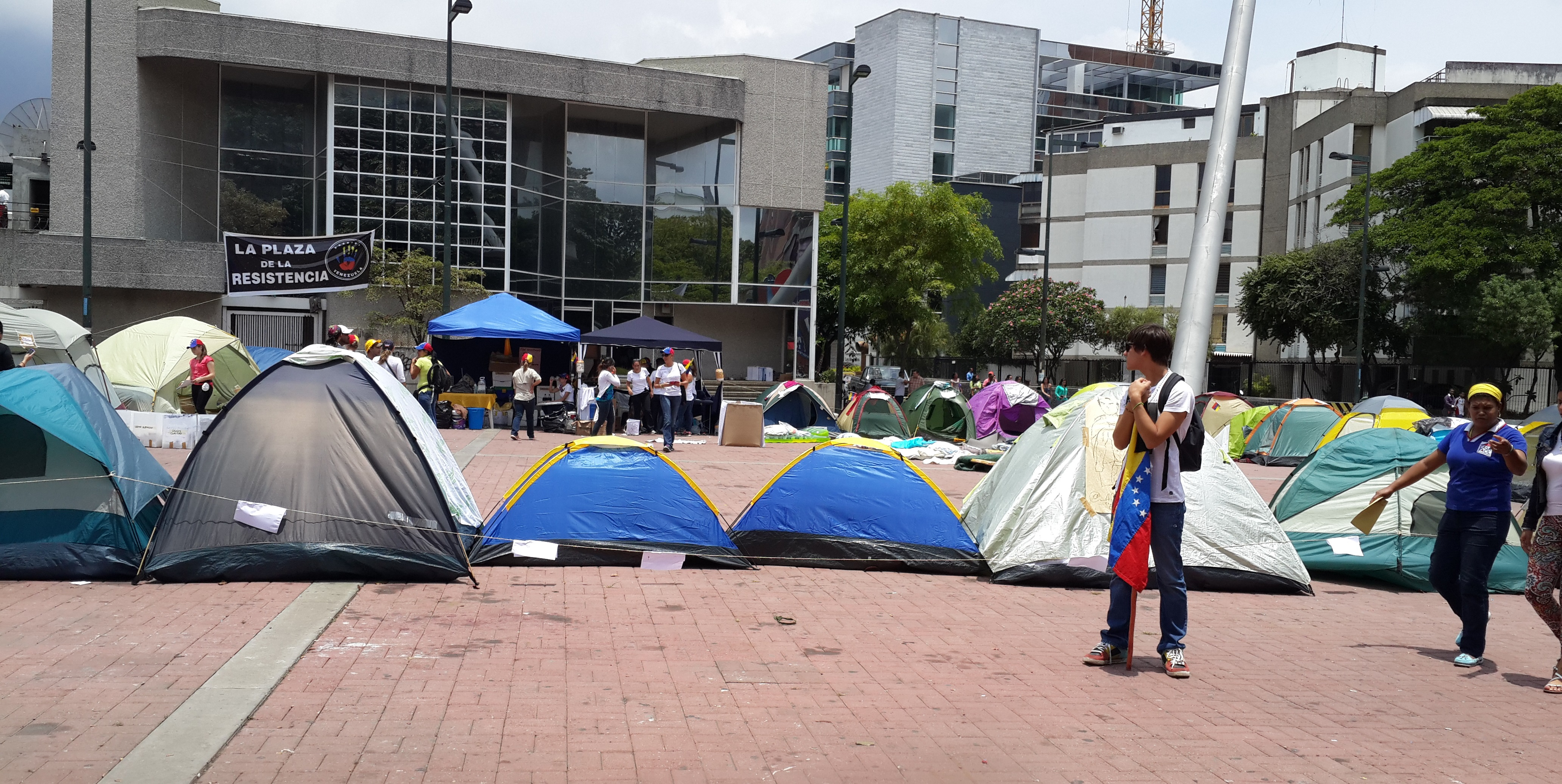
Opposition protesters camping in tents demonstrating against the government.

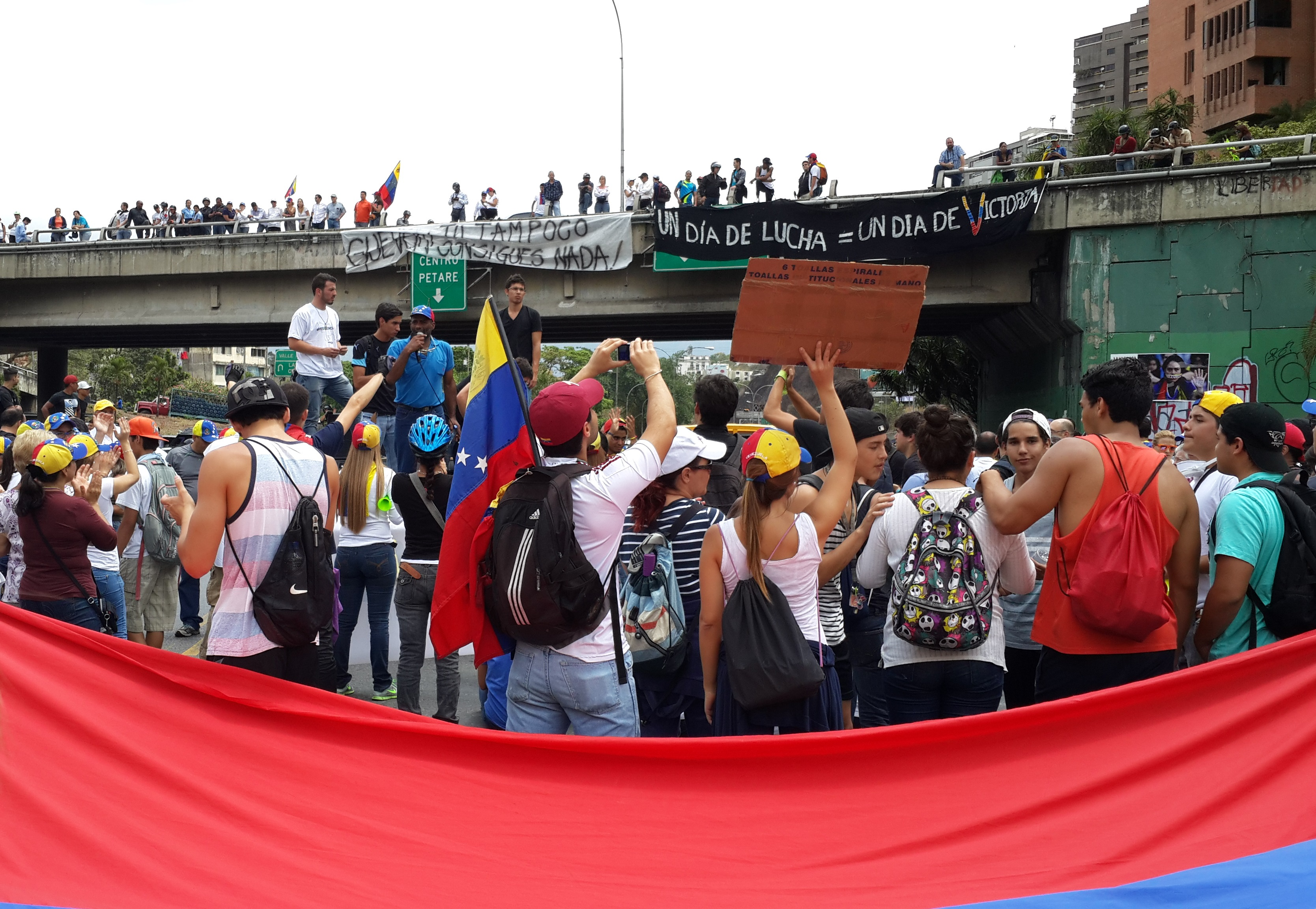
An opposition rally protesting against the government.

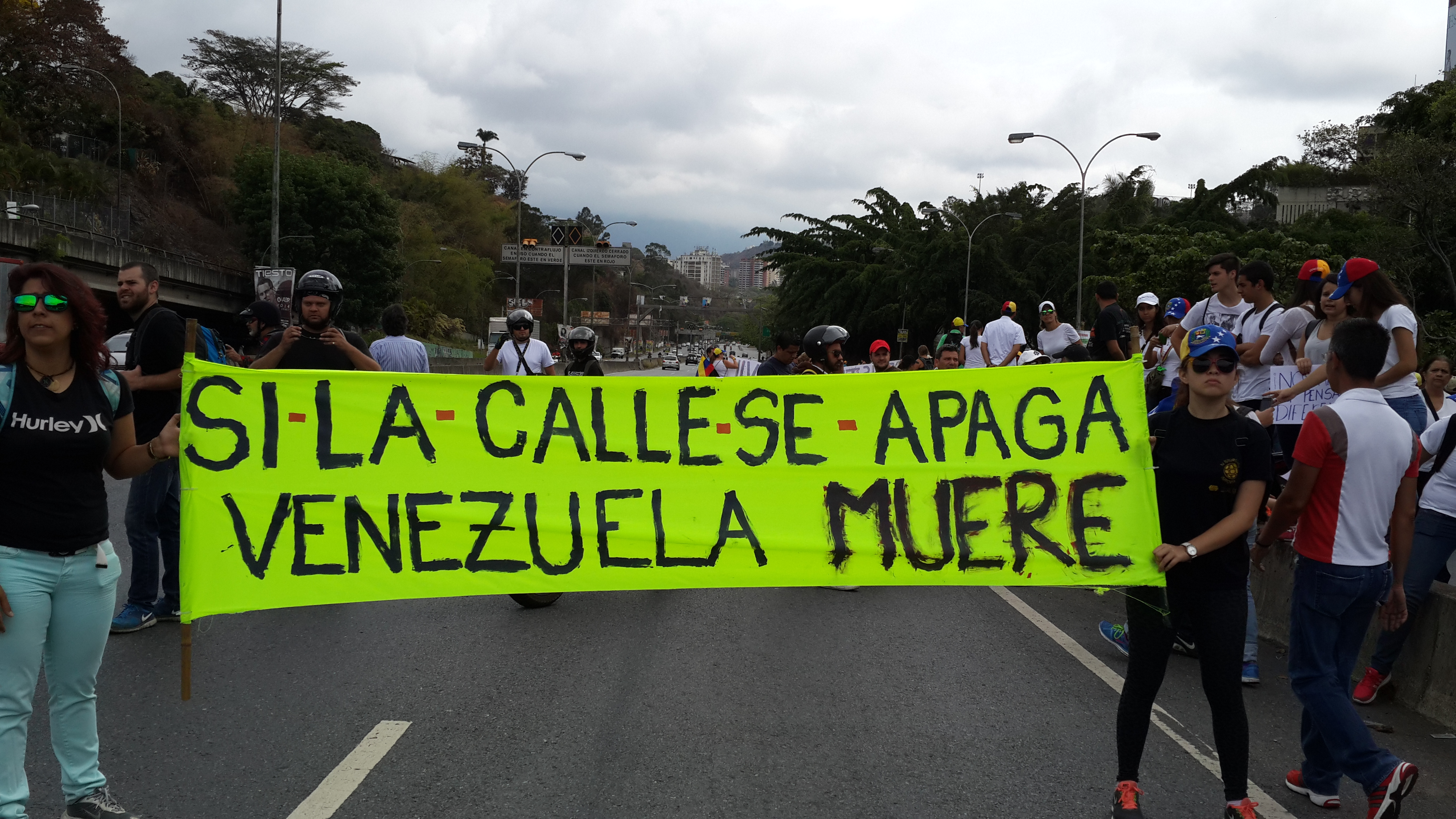
Opposition protesters holding a sign saying "If the street turns off, Venezuela dies".

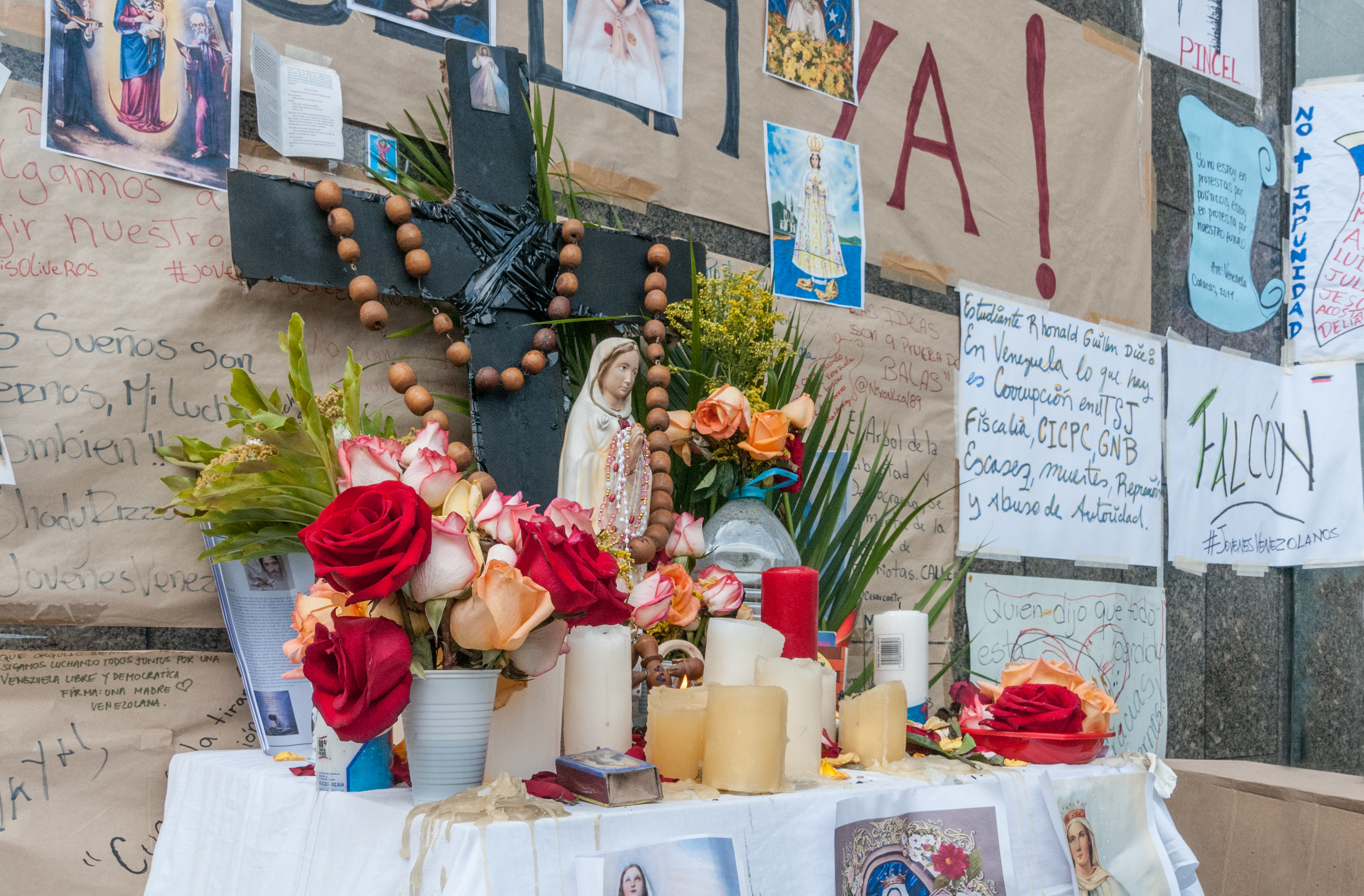
Prayer altar at the UN headquarters during the hunger strike for a ruling by the UN.

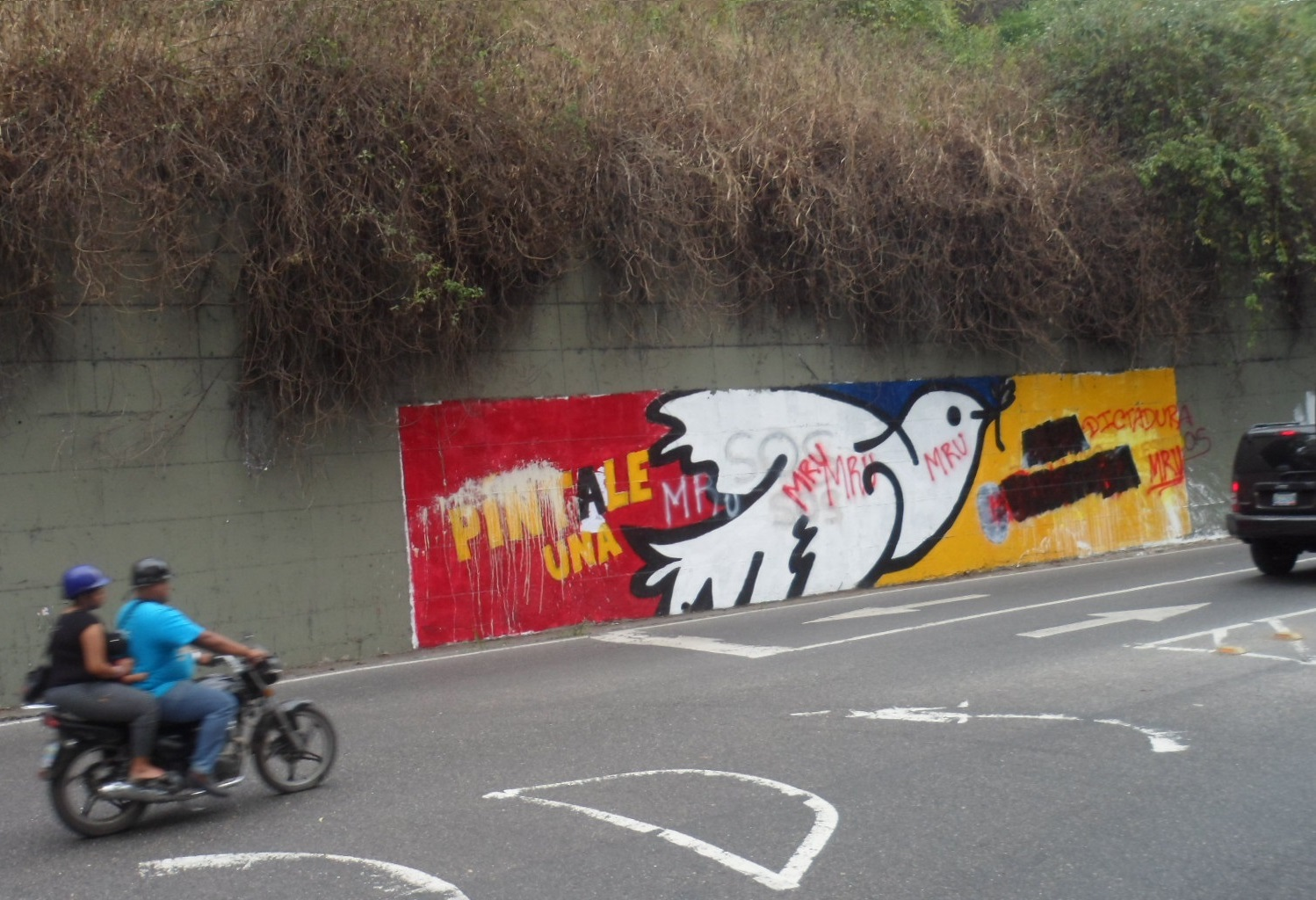
A wall painting that previously criticized barricades was changed to criticize the "dictatorship".

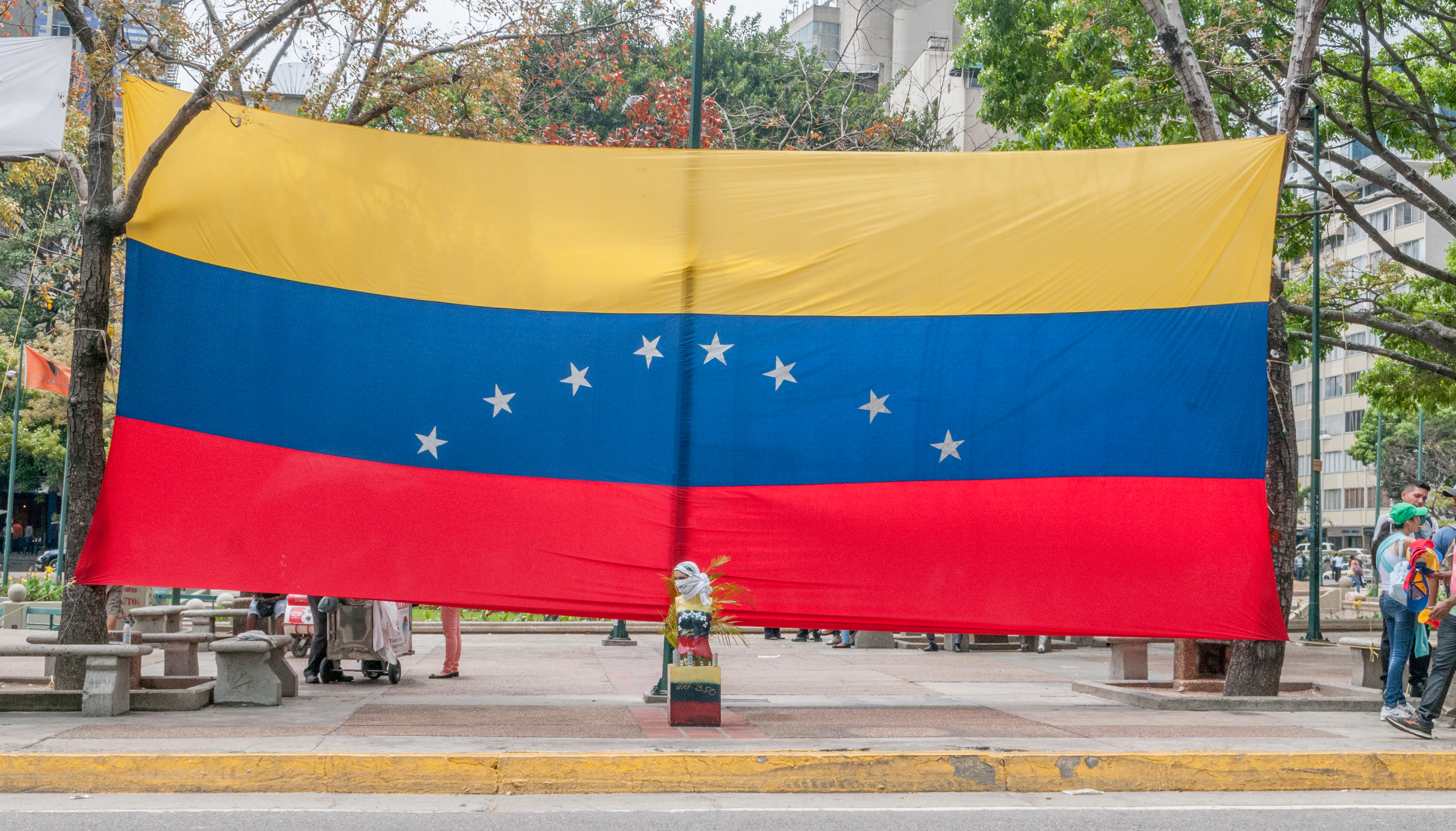
Venezuelan flag that was placed during peaceful protests against the government of Nicolas Maduro at Altamira Square.

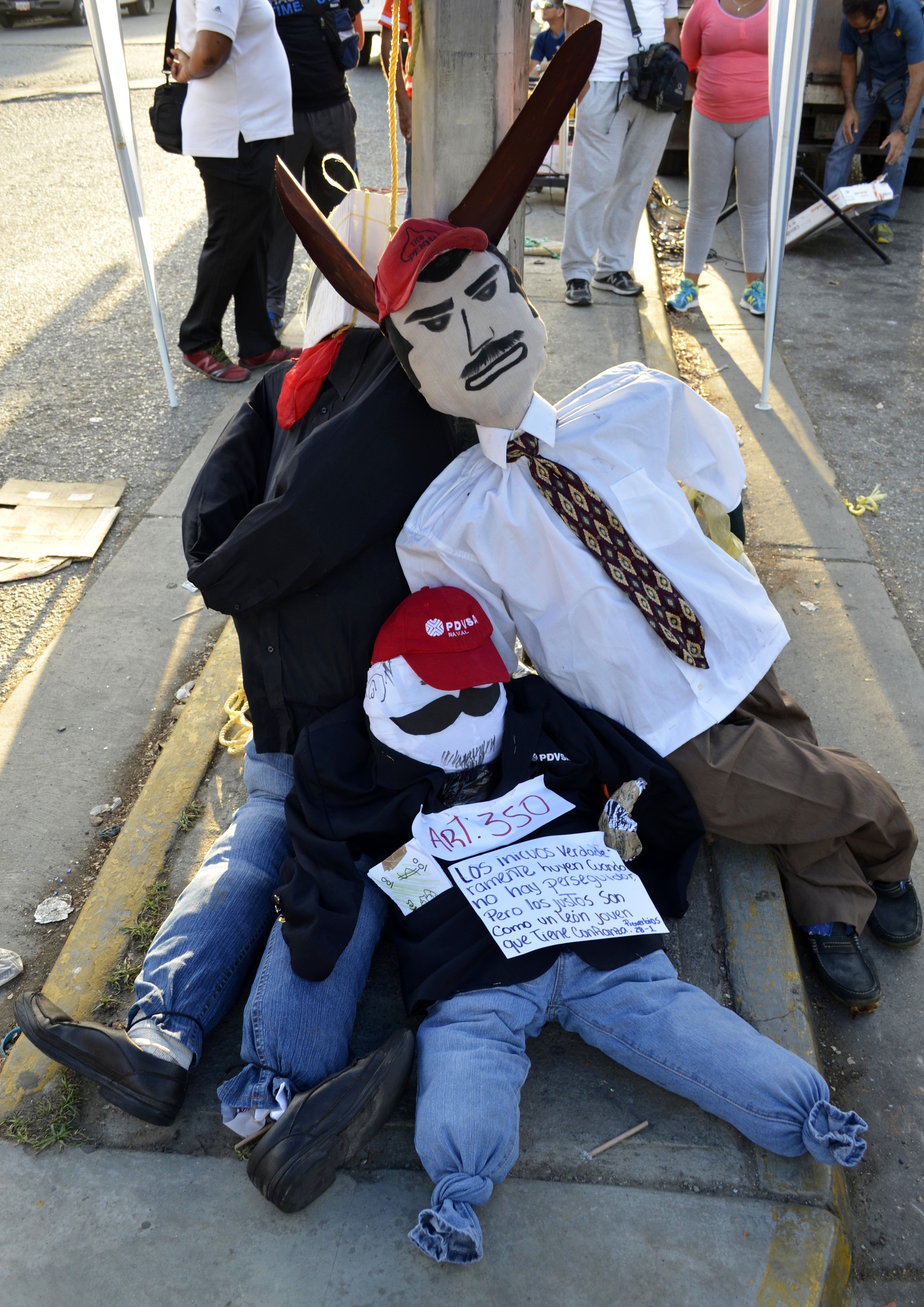
Effigies of Nicolas Maduro and other government figures that were burnt during a Burning of Judas gathering on Easter.

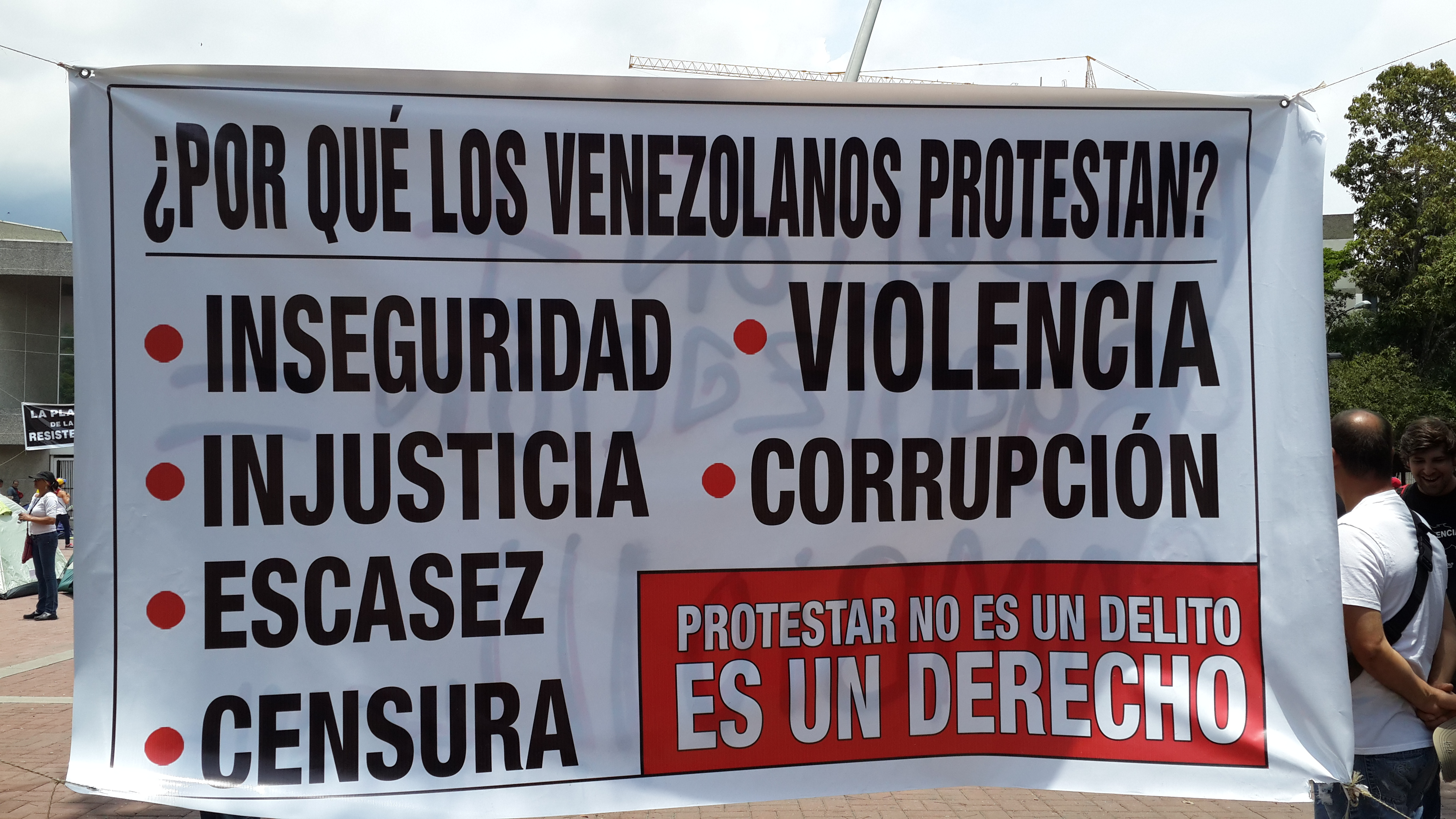
A sign explaining why the opposition protest. "Why do the Venezuelans protest? Insecurity, injustice, shortages, censorship, violence, corruption. Protesting is not a crime. Is a right".

- 1 April – In a New York Times op-ed, President Maduro discusses the ongoing protests. He writes of distortions by the foreign media, claiming the protests primarily represent wealthier segments of society, not "mainstream sentiment," and points to improvements in inequality and poverty and the creation of universal health care and education programs. Citizens of Caracas protested demanding justice and the end of repression. María Corina Machado along with supporters began a march toward downtown Caracas protesting against Machado's expulsion and were surrounded by the National Guard which prevented them from leaving and dispersed with tear gas. Protests in front of the UN headquarters began blocking Francisco de Miranda Avenue. Barricades continued to block traffic in many cities. Amnesty International presented a report about "torture, abuse, arbitrary arrests, helplessness and human rights violations against opponents of the government" with the organization saying protesters "do not want to talk for fear of retaliation".
- 2 April – Students from the Central University of Venezuela (UCV), Andrés Bello Catholic University (UCAB), Simón Bolívar University (USB), Monte Avila University (AMU) and the Metropolitan University (Unimet) conducted meetings discussing which activities should be performed in the future. Students of UCV continued to protest and refused to return to classes. A professor at Simon Bolivar University did not deny that trees have been used in barricades but says that the president's claim of 5,000 trees is a "product of political confrontation" and said that deforestation by companies was more dangerous due to "the lack of environmental monitoring by the Ministry of Environment". The Bolivarian National Police began using stun grenades on protesters in Chacao.
- 3 April – The Colegio de Abogados de Venezuela went to the Supreme Tribunal of Justice and denounced the imprisonment of public officials calling it a "kidnapping". President Maduro signed a decree creating the Human Rights Council, with the aim of "fully enforcing the Venezuelans' human rights". Maduro stated that "If they want to change the government out of desperation, whether at the level of a mayor, a governor, or the President of the Republic, here is your way to do it (the Constitution of Venezuela). Collect the signatures, if you get enough of them, then we're calling a referendum in 2016". Colectivos entered into the UCV, and a student was undressed and beaten by these groups.
- 4 April – In the early morning, about 70 protesters gathered discussing problems in Plaza Candelaria and were assaulted by colectivos with violent insults, threats with firearms and some pushing while neighbors retaliated with fireworks and throwing objects. Leopoldo Lopez was formally indicted of "arson in degree of determiner, public incitement, damage to public property and grade determiner conspiracy" and could face more than 13 years in prison if convicted. In Barquisimeto, a tank belonging to the National Guard ran over a fleeing 18-year-old protester. President of the faculty association of the Central University of Venezuela, Victor Marquez, called on President Maduro to protect students saying the problems at the university "stem from a government policy of not allowing peaceful public protests" after colectivos armed with wooden clubs, metal rods and guns attacked the university at least 10 times during the protests while government forces watched without intervening. A student mistaken for a colectivo was attacked in an opposition protest.
- 5 April – María Corina Machado visited student protesting in front of the UN headquarters. President Maduro said he would not have dialogue with "fascists" and said the MUD does not want dialogue because they are "betting on a meltdown".
- 6 April – The Student Movement called on Venezuelans to place Venezuelan flags and other objects containing the Venezuelan flag's tricolor on cars, homes and clothing. Nairobi Pinto, chief editor for Globovision was kidnapped by two hooded men. Clashes between protesters and government forces occurred throughout the day in El Cafetal, Caracas. The protesters reported the tear gas used during the clashes was expired.
- 7 April – Physicians that were protesting blocked Urdaneta Avenue in Caracas. Chavista workers from SIDOR protested against the government explaining issues with benefits, agreements, investments, weak pay increases and the "abandonment" by the government.
- 8 April – Mothers and fathers in Chacao had a silent demonstration and dressed in black with blank signs to protest against those who lacked interest in Venezuela's current crisis. A meeting between MUD and the Venezuelan government was held at the Casa Amarilla after the government accepted conditions for dialogue.
- 9 April – Medical students form UCV had a "Health Day" and protested while seeing patients on the street. Workers of the media demanded for the release of Nairobi Pinto, the chief editor for Globovision.
- 10 April – Bioanalysis students of the Central University of Venezuela held class at the Plaza de Los Palos Grandes while protesting. A small group of protesters traveled around Caracas dressed in army men costumes and holding signs saying, "As a child, they were my heroes, now the repress me". At night, a large group of students and citizens protested against their "lost future" and in respect to for those who have died during the protests. Peace talks between Maduro and the opposition's Democratic Unity Round Table alliance, including Henry Capriles, are televised. Foreign ministers of Brazil, Colombia and Ecuador also partake, while a Vatican representative reads a letter from Pope Francis supporting national reconciliation. A follow-up meeting is announced for April 15. After the six hours of peace talks, skepticism was generated between conflicting parties and also among citizens in Venezuela.
- 11 April – Members of the Movement of Young Venezuelans began a hunger strike while continuing to protest in tents in front of the UN headquarters. Diosdado Cabello insulted opposition members who attended the peace talks a day before declaring, "They sat a group of Venezuelans whose intention to sit and listen to what we were saying is recognized, but do not like to be told things". Leaders of Popular Will told Venezuelans to keep protesting until the Venezuelan government provided changes and said that the previous day peace talks had taken place in "unfair conditions", during which "a sole party acted as moderator". A group on motorcycles protested in Sucre causing blockages of traffic.
- 12 April – Thousands of opposition protesters in separate groups each wore a different color of red, yellow and blue and began to demonstrate in Caracas after Maria Corina Machado called on them to protest.
- 13 April – President Maduro announced plans of a new "ministry of international communication" due to an alleged "communications war unleashed against the country, the revolution and especially against me as president". Athletes gathered in Miranda and protested against the violence present in Venezuela.
- 14 April – Nairobi Pinto was released from her captors after over a week of being held and said she could not explain the situation due to" safety reasons". Students from the University of Oriente (UDO), Universidad Santa María (USM), the Universidad Gran Mariscal de Ayacucho (UGMA) and other citizens pitched tents to stay in the streets of Anzoategui while protesting against the crisis claiming that protesting in the streets is "the only way". The government and some opposition leaders had a second dialogue meeting.
- 15 April – Metrobuses in Caracas begin to run with banners on their windows against "fascism" accompanied with pictures of Hugo Chávez and Simon Bolivar.
- 16 April – Colectivos in several trucks allegedly attacked an apartment complex known for protesting damaging 5 vehicles, leaving 2 burnt, and fired several shots into the apartments leaving one person injured from a gunshot wound. Large groups of students in Caracas conducted a protest while barefoot mimicking the Stations of the Cross, with each "station" representing a problem Venezuela was facing.
- 17 April – Clashes between protesters and police occurred in Chacao. Crowds held a vigil for those who died during the protests near the Prados del Este highway.
- 18 April – A student in Valencia was killed after being shot at least seven times. Maria Corina Machado returned to Venezuela after meeting with members of the European Union. Citizens in Zulia protested for the release of Leopoldo Lopez two months after he was arrested and for the release of those allegedly detained unjustly.
- 19 April – President Nicolas Maduro made statements about Venezuela's independence saying "Long has been our way as a people to achieve true and lasting independence, 204 years of the 19th of April and the struggle continues" and that his previous year in office was "[a] year of unity and battle, exercising with the People's Power for Socialist Chavez and the Bolivarian Revolution". The Metropolitan Mayor of Caracas, Antonio Ledezma, announced a march for the following day of Easter called "The Pilgrimage of Resistance" which would be attended by members of the National Assembly and various mayors from different municipalities. The National Guard and armed groups attacked residents in Barquisimeto firing gas, lead pellets and rubber pellets into homes resulting in several injuries, damaged vehicles and left the area without power after shooting an electrical transformer.
- 20 April – During some traditional Easter celebrations of the Burning of Judas, some anti-government protesters burned effigies of President Maduro and other government officials saying they betrayed the Venezuelan people just as Judas Iscariot had betrayed Jesus. Protesters marched to the headquarters of the United Nations Program for Development called the "Resurrection of Democracy" where Maria Corina Machado explained that "The whole world understands that we are now fighting for democracy and giving freedom. The whole world condemns the blow given to parliament in these times when it prevents me from entering" and Antonio Ledezma said that, "It's not enough to pray, you have to go out and fight to achieve the resurrection of democracy. The historic alliance of workers and students is at the forefront of this struggle for a better country". Residents of Carabobo protested with banners and flags for social improvements and denounced shortages effecting them. Clashes occurred between protesters and the National Guard.
- 21 April – In the early morning, protesters blocked traffic on the Prados del Este highway in Caracas. The highway remained closed for ten hours while clashes between the National Guard and protesters left one water vehicle inoperable.
- 22 April – Movimiento Estudiantil held a press conference at the Central University of Venezuela denouncing "repressive acts and prohibition" of protests by the government, explained that political parties involved in dialogue with the government "do not represent the Student Movement of Venezuela" and announced that they would continue to protest. Students of the National Experimental Polytechnic University (Unexpo) protested against insecurities after frequent robberies and a recent incident where a student was shot. Four people; a taxi driver, a police officer of Mérida, and two other men, were shot in Mérida while trying to remove barricades. In Santa Fe, fires were reported after tear gas was used.
- 23 April – Protesters in Maracaibo blocked traffic with trucks, garbage and tires. They were later dispersed by the National Guard with tear gas. Antonio Ledezma traveled to San Cristobal to show his support for Patricia Ceballos, wife of jailed leader Daniel Ceballos, who is running in the elections to take his lost position.
- 24 April – The Constitutional Chamber of the Venezuelan Supreme Tribunal of Justice ruled that protests could not be held without permission from the state saying, "Any concentration, demonstration or meeting that does not have the prior endorsement by the respective competent authority to do so may result in the police ... dispersing with the use of the most appropriate mechanisms for this". President Maduro also announced that the government had "defeated guarimbas" and showed his concern for authorities that were injured. In Barquisimeto, parents protested against resolution 058 saying that it would have an "alleged socialist influence" in schools.
- 25 April – A group of bioanalysts protested against shortages of medical supplies with the President of the College of Bioanalysts, Judith Leon, saying that "60% of people who come to hospitals will not be addressed because lack of supplies". Protesters demonstrated in front of the UN headquarters on social and economic problems and also warned about the proposed educational reform by the government.
- 26 April – Thousands of protesters demonstrated throughout Venezuela with many protesters denouncing the Venezuelan government's education reform that allegedly indoctrinates socialist models among young students. The father of Robert Redman, a student that was allegedly killed by government authorities on 12 February, participated in marches with Maria Corina Machado and Lilian Tintori.
- 27 April – Protests occurred inside the Centro Comercial El Recreo mall in Caracas with demonstrators using signs, banners and flags in the mall's corridors.
- 28 April – Parents and representatives in Carabobo marched to Ombudsman to deliver a letter to them, protesting against resolution 058 and "ideology in schools". Students at the Central University of Venezuela demonstrated outside of the chancellor of the university's office protesting against insecurity. Groups of teachers, Movimiento Estudiantil, press workers with SNTP and the Medical Federation of Venezuela (FMV) announced that they will all take part in protests on 1 May.
- 29 April – Workers of government-run Corpoelec protested asking for raises in pay, collective bargaining and demanded improvements on working conditions. A man was arrested for attempting to construct barricades on Francisco de Miranda Avenue. Law students of the University of Central Venezuela made statements about the court's decision on protests saying "[t]he Judgment of the Constitutional Court was not given to protect the right to life and freedom" and said that they would not recognize the court's decision. Friends and family sang Happy Birthday to Leopoldo Lopez outside of the prison he was being held at.
- 30 April – Students protested at Simon Bolivar University (USB), blocking its entrance while denouncing the Venezuelan Supreme Court's decision on protests. Students at University of Santa María (USM) protested against the arrests of their fellow students and blocked access to the House of Studies on the campus.

=== May ===
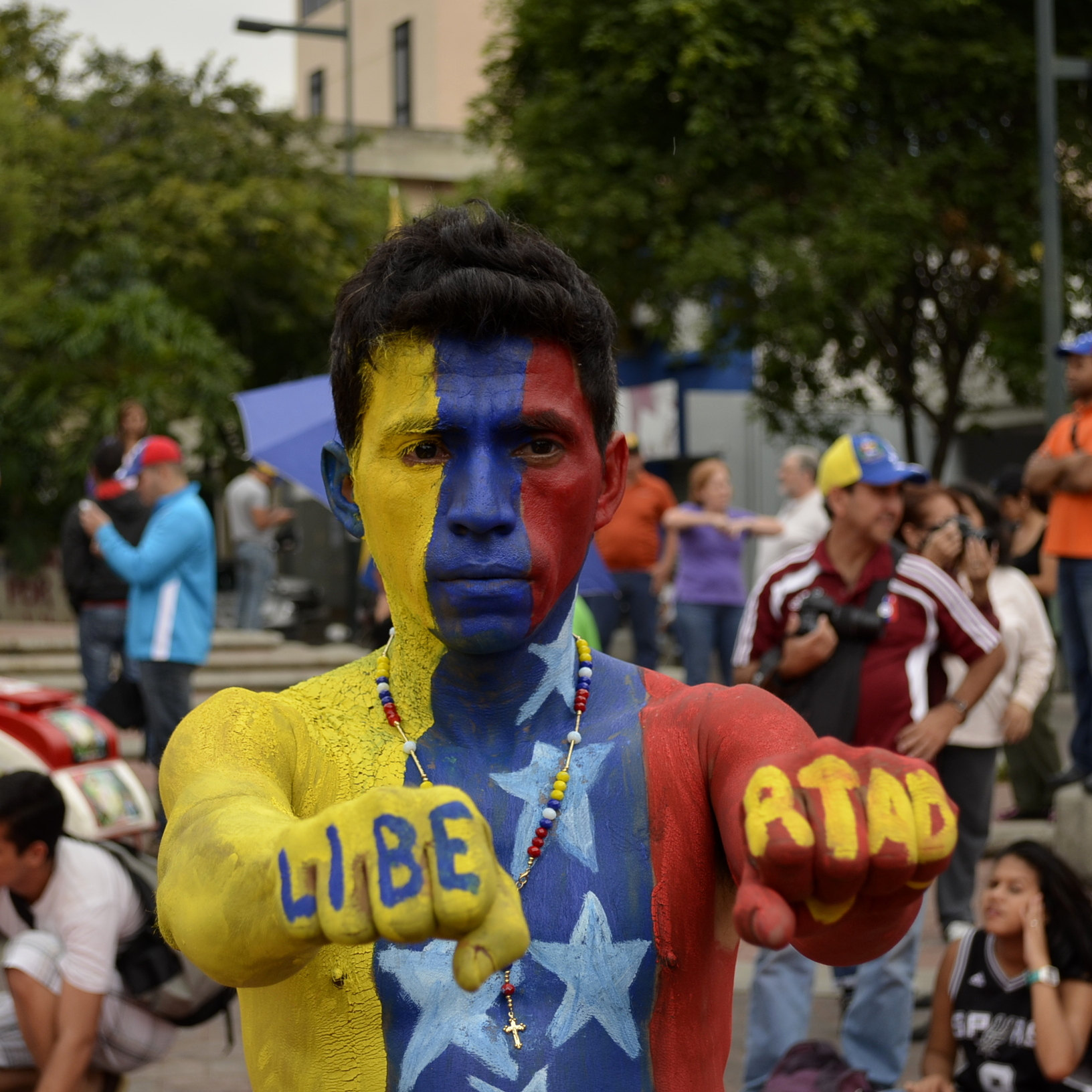
Protester with Libertad written on his fingers.

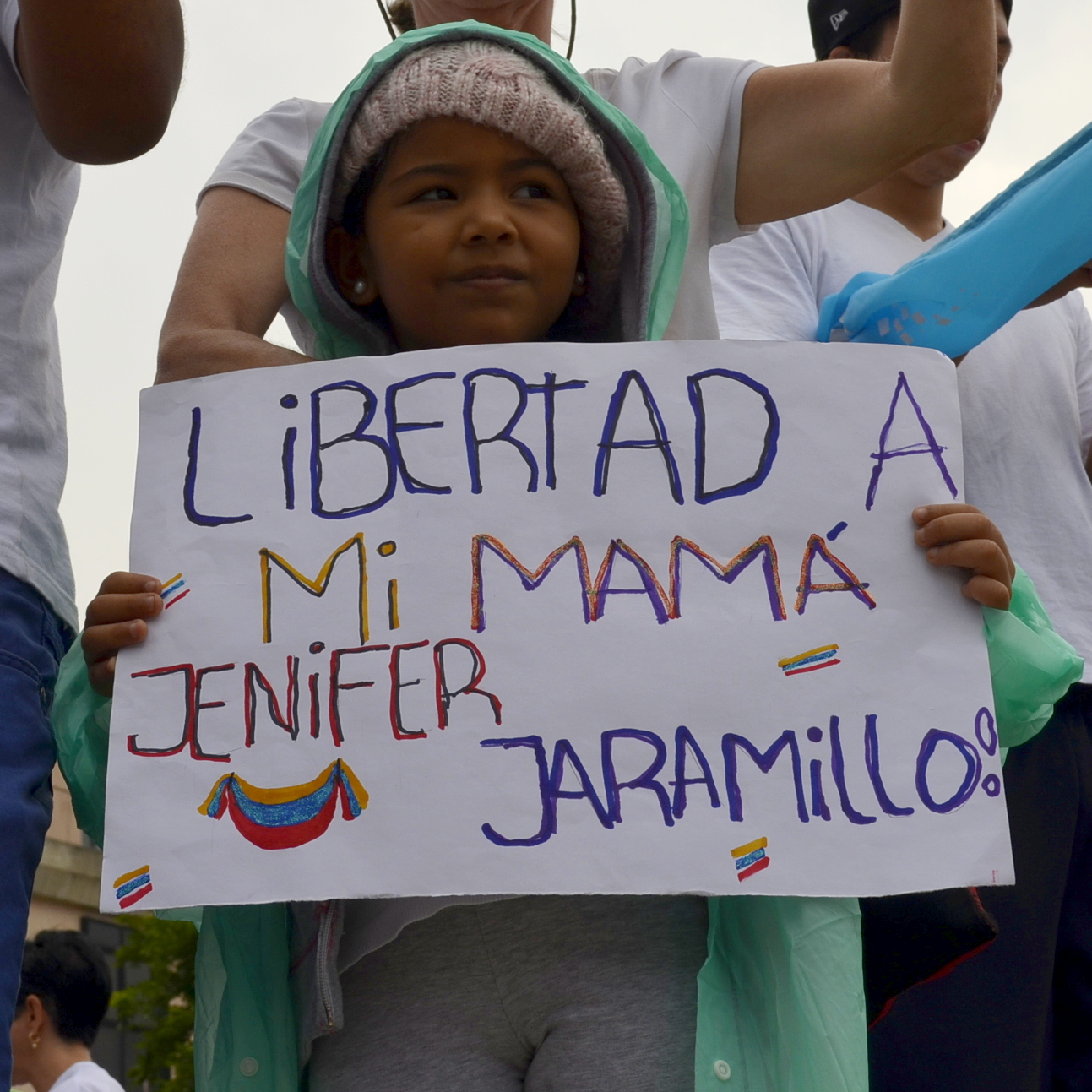
A child protester asking for the freedom of her mother.

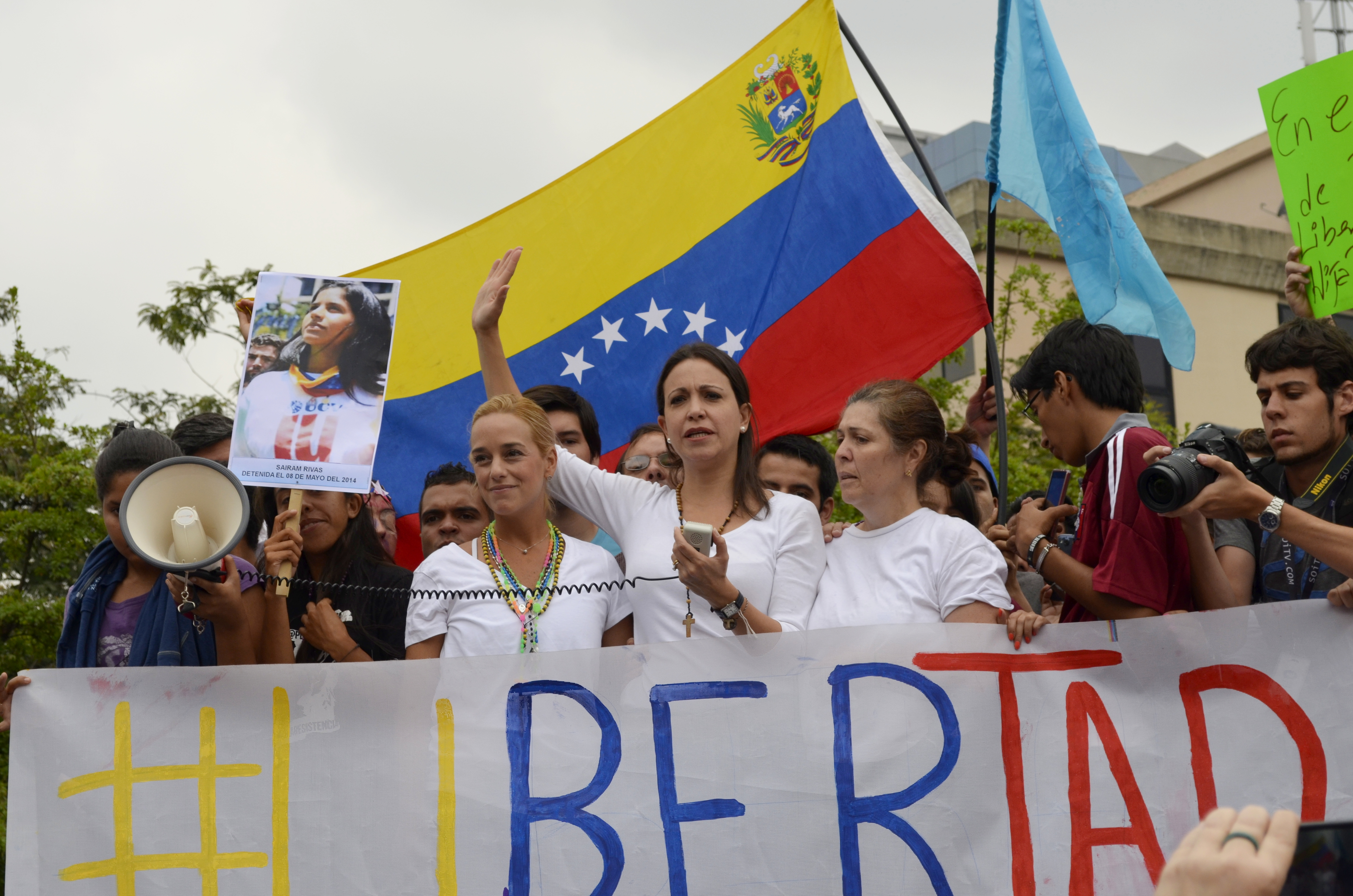
María Corina Machado and Lilian Tintori leading a march on 10 May.

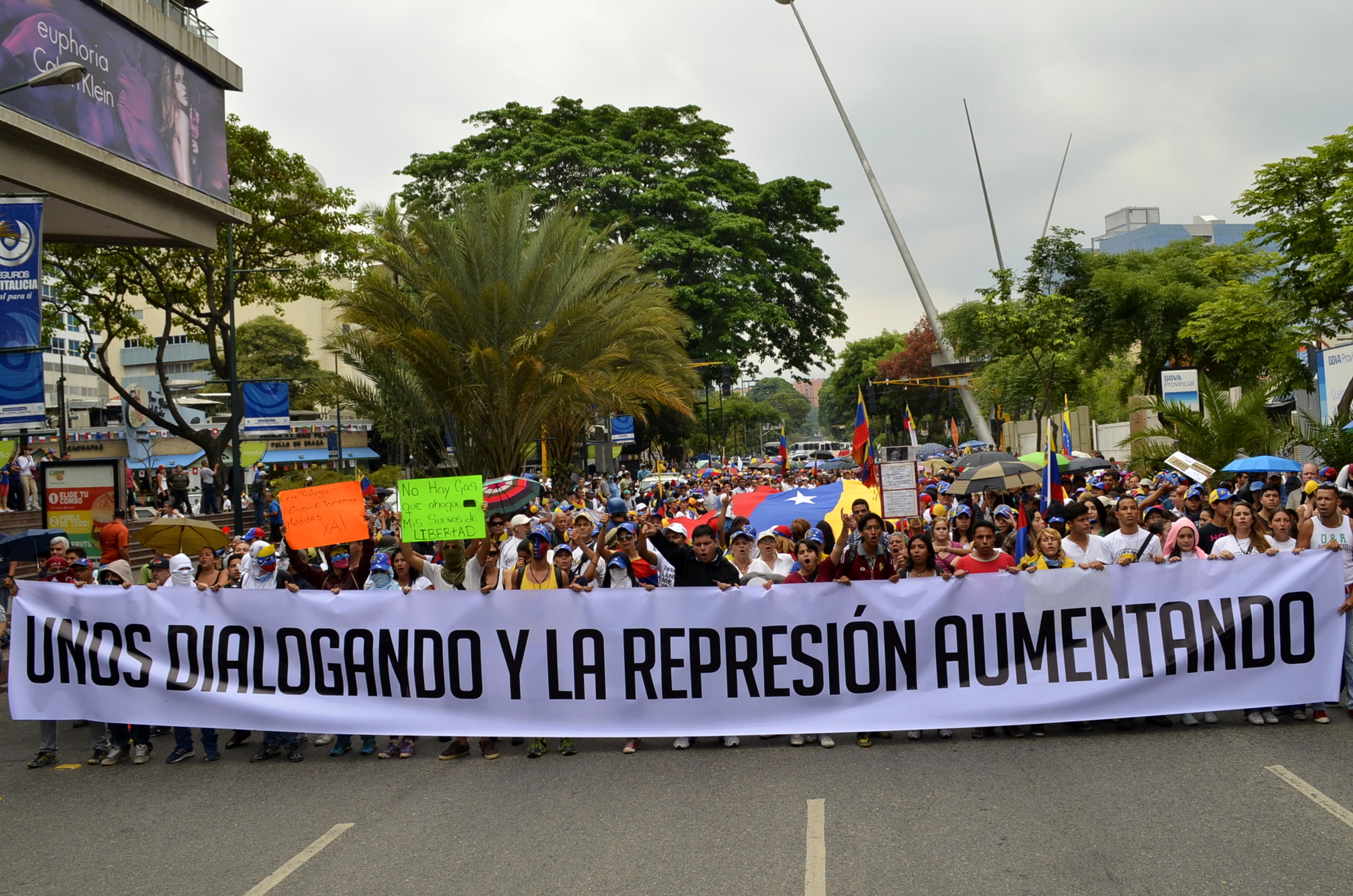
Group of protesters during 10 May protests.

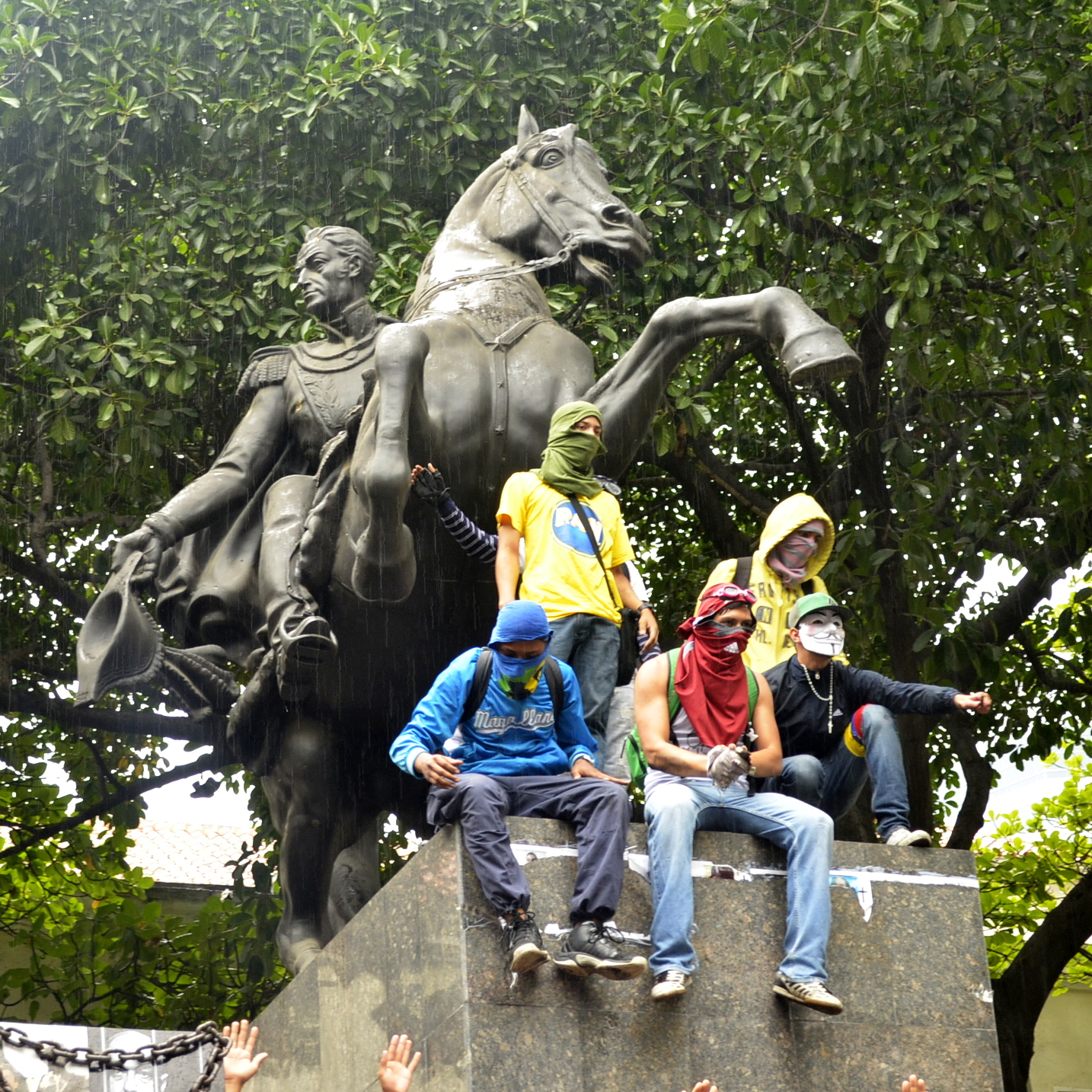
Protesters perched on a statue of Simón Bolívar.

- 1 May – To commemorate Labor Day, thousands of Venezuelans participated in two major rallies in Caracas. In east Caracas, worker unions, student organizations, opposition leaders, physicians, and journalists demonstrated against the Venezuelan government. The groups said the minimum wage increase was not enough due to the country's official rate being so high, denouncing shortages and police shortages while holding banners. In west Caracas, pro-government demonstrators gathered to show support for the government. Maduro said the minimum wage increase was a "necessary defense" against inflation, while Vice President Jorge Arreaza announced that the unemployment rate in Venezuela is at a record low of 7.2%. Protesters gathered at Altamira Square and were dispersed by authorities leaving some injured from pellets.
- 2 May – Melvin Collazo, the private SEBIN officer who shot at students on 12 February was released. Interior Minister Miguel Rodriguez Torres accused 58 foreigners of inciting violent protests and stated that the United States was involved.
- 3 May – A group of 30 students from the Polytechnic University Institute joined protesters that were camped outside of the UN headquarters on Francisco de Miranda Avenue.
- 4 May – In Maracay, groups of people protested for the release of Leopoldo Lopez and others who were imprisoned during the protests. In Carabobo near the Eastern Freeway, neighbors from Mañongo protested with flags and slogans against policies made by President Maduro.
- 5 May – At least 7 people were injured and 18 arrested in Carabobo during clashes between protesters and the National Guard. 6 people were injured and classes were cancelled after students at the Catholic University Andrés Bello (UCAB) held protests that resulted in clashes with the National Guard who dispersed protesters with tear gas and buckshot. Classes at the University of the Andes were empty due to students protesting in honor for those who were injured or killed during the protests. Armed colectivos attacked and burnt down Fermín Toro University after intimidating student protesters and shooting one.
- 6 May – A group of individuals that took place in the 1992 coup attempt led by Hugo Chávez protested against the government demanding more rights. Peaceful student demonstrations were attacked by pro-government armed groups that were assisted by government forces at the Catholic University Andrés Bello. Hundreds of student protesters that were denouncing the burning of Fermín Toro University were dispersed by government forces with buckshot and tear gas. A Metrobus driver was injured after being hit with a fire bomb.
- 7 May – Citizens in Tucacas in Falcon state protested because they were left without electricity for three days. Students from the Metropolitan University in Caracas blocked Gran Mariscal de Ayacucho Highway while protesting against social, economic and political problems. The National Police then dispersed the university students with tear gas which caused a fire that was controlled hours later.
- 8 May – The protester camps in front of the UN headquarters in Caracas and in other locations were dismantled by hundreds of National Guardsmen who then arrested 243 people at the camps where authorities allegedly found weapons and drugs. Students of Universidad Santa María responded to the dismantling of camps by protesting and blocking access to the university, which caused heavy congestion on the roadway. Later that day in Caracas, a police officer from the National Police was fatally shot in the neck with three others being injured after clashes with protesters who did not agree with the dismantling of camps.

== Later events ==
- 9 May – Tupamaros protested against the proposed sanctions by the United States against Venezuelan officials who allegedly violated human rights, denouncing the "interference in the internal affairs of our country". Student protesters at a camp in Maracay were attacked by armed motorcyclists that fired shots, threw Molotov cocktails and destroyed 30 tents at the camp leaving 5 students injured. During a protest in Lecheria, a student of Santa Maria University was shot near her head by police. President Maduro responded to the United States' intention of enforcing sanctions against Venezuelan officials, deeming them "stupid". Maduro stated: "They say [the US] they will punish us. Draw your sanctions, Simón Bolívar's people won't be hindered by any sanction from any empire".
- 10 May – Protesters marched from Chacao to the UNDP headquarters in Altamira, denouncing the "aggressions" against protester camps. Some young protesters in Altamira began to set up barricades with public furnishings in the area and were then quickly dispersed by the National Police with tear gas. Students, mothers and political leaders peacefully protested on the streets of Caracas saying that there was nothing to celebrate on Mother's Day because mothers had lost their children during the protests from both murder and arrests.
- 11 May – Hundreds of protesters peacefully marched in east Caracas denouncing the dismantling of camps by the government. The march concluded with the singing of the Venezuelan national anthem with some groups leaving the march to block roads near Altamira Square. The protesters tried to block traffic near the plaza for about an hour and were then dispersed by the National Police with tear gas.
- 12 May – Groups of workers of the Caracas Metro marched to the Supreme Court denouncing attacks on infrastructure and asking for an investigation of the governor of Miranda, Henrique Capriles, due to damages. In the Las Mercedes municipality of Caracas, protesters and government authorities clashed. It was estimated that 8 students were arrested during the clashes including the son of the pro-government governor Ramón Rodríguez Chacín, who was freed minutes later.
- 13 May – There were several demonstrations in at least three different colleges, including the University of Santa Maria in Mariches that was closed due to protests, the National Experimental University of Táchira and the Pedagogical University Experimental Libertador Rubio where tear gas was reportedly used.
- 14 May – Hundreds of students marched in Caracas peacefully asking for the release of students and denouncing the disassembly of camps. However, some protesters left the march creating clashes with security forces that resulted in approximately 80 arrests. A group of reporters covering the incident said they were assaulted by the National Guard after Guardsmen fired at them and attempted to arrest a reporter. One National Guardsmen was injured after he was hit by a bus carrying arrested protesters.
- 15 May – Protests occurred at Terrazas del Avila in Sucre. Several boxes were placed outside of the Justice of Carabobo and the prosecutors office in Margarita in protest against unresolved court cases. At the Central University of Venezuela, the schools of Mechanical Engineering, Law, Electrical Engineering, Chemical Engineering, Pharmacy and Bioanalysis were closed after students refused to attend classes in protest against the arrest of demonstrators the previous day. Students also protested against the arrests of students at the University of Los Andes in Tachira, Simon Bolivar University and the Metropolitan University in Chacao. A bridge was closed by groups that were protesting against the lack of water and food.
- 16 May – Some classes at Central University of Venezuela remained empty as students denounced the arrests of hundreds of protesters from the previous day. In Isabelica, citizens protested against the lack of water, no electricity and due to trash being left in the streets for several days. Students gathered at the plaza of University Rafael Belloso Chacin after four days of cancelled classes due to protests. Groups of hooded individuals also attacked a bus at the University Rafael Belloso Chacin.
- 17 May – The Federation of Associations of Venezuela (FAPUV) called on all teachers to hold a national strike on 22 May with the president of the Association of Teachers of the Central University of Venezuela, Victor Marquez, saying "While the boys are in the streets protesting and arrested, the university seems pretending to operate as if absolutely nothing happening". A group of more than 220 former officers of the Institutional Military Front criticized the MUD for having dialogue with the government.
- 18 May – Residents of Petare protested against the lack of water. In Caracas, a march was held in support of the Venezuelan LGBT communities.
- 19 May – Prados del Este highway was congested for hours until the National Guard removed protesters and a barricade. A group of mothers effected from the protests created a group called the Venezuelan Mothers Front. Protests returned to Lara state where demonstrators blocked streets and had clashes with the National Guard. A group of protesters blocked roads in Anzoategui state and burned a PDVSA truck. Clashes occurred between protesters and the National Police in the Las Minitas neighborhood of Baruta. Neighbors of Las Minitas reported tear gas was fired near the position of children in the area.
- 20 May – Clashes occurred throughout the early morning in Pueblo Nuevo between citizens and soldiers with some fighting lasting for several hours.
- 21 May – Coordinators of Movimiento Estudiantil denounced recent attacks on students with firearms saying that the only thing students are armed with are "notebooks and pencils". Families in the city of Barquisimeto in Lara state blocked roads while demanding water. Students of the University of Simor Bolivar blocked hallways by piling several desks and chairs at their entrances.
- 22 May – Several universities held strikes due to the arrests of their students. Citizens in multiple cities protested due to a lack of water or for having dirty water. Students protested in Maracaibo against the arrests of fellow students, insecurity and other problems the country was facing. Protesters demonstrated in Chacao blocking Francisco de Miranda and Uslar Pietri Avenues. Bus drivers in La Urbina blocked roads with their buses protesting against the conditions in the country.
- 23 May – Students of multiple universities marched to the public prosecutor in Tachira demanding the release of fellow students. Workers of travel agencies protested against the troubles their sector is facing. Employees of the Venezuela Housing Mission protested due to a delay in payments. Traders in San Pedro protested against the insecurity in the area.
- 24 May – After 100 days, protests continued with several students and citizens demonstrating in marches. Students in Barinas protested against "insecurity, scarcity, youth killed by the regime and others unjustly imprisoned, repression, violation of human rights, among others".
- 25 May – Citizens of municipalities elected the wives of arrested opposition mayors who will replace the positions of their husbands.
- 26 May – 900 soldiers protested one block away from Miraflores Palace due to not being reinstated after participating in the events of February 4, 1992. Students from UNEFA and IUTEC protested on the Pan American Highway. Members of the Venezuelan National Youth Organization demonstrated outside of the Embassy of Costa Rica asking for the Costa Rican government "to speak out publicly to demand that the Venezuelan government to cease repression, persecution and imprisonment of Venezuelan students protest peacefully". Students of IUTIRLA protested by barricading streets by sitting in school desks. Students of UNIMET blocked traffic on Gran Mariscal de Ayacucho Highway while protesting.
- 27 May – Citizens who bought subsidized food from a Mercal store in Barquisimeto protested after they were locked out of the store due to shortages. 11 former military members were arrested in front of Miraflores Palace. Protests occurred in Altamira where demonstrators blocked traffic on Luis Roche Avenue with barricades.
- 28 May – Students of the Catholic University of Táchira (UCAT) held early morning protests against various issues the country was facing which then led to clashes with the police and the National Guard. Citizens of Barquisimeto held a peaceful march titled "Lara in the street" while protesting against repression, arrests and other problems in Venezuela.
- 29 May – Motorists protested in Los Teques against the insecurities they faced, blocking the Panamerican pass. Students from University College of Los Teques Cecilio Acosta (CULTCA) protested due to the poor quality of food being served to them rotten or had worms and cockroaches in it. Four people were arrested in Santa Fe after police dispersed a protest and removed debris blocking a road. Protests occurred at the Catholic University of Táchira which led to clashes that injured 5 after high school students stole a bus. Protest leaders later denounced the theft saying the act "should not distort and the protest should be peaceful".
- 30 May – In the morning hours, three buses blocked traffic outside of the University of Carabobo while protesting against insecurities in the country. Citizens in Valencia near the Camoruco mall protested against Resolution 058. Students at National Experimental University of Tachira (UNET) and police clashed which resulted in the students creating a large barricade to defend themselves.
- 31 May – Various universities in Venezuela rescheduled academic events in order to help students that were affected by the protests.

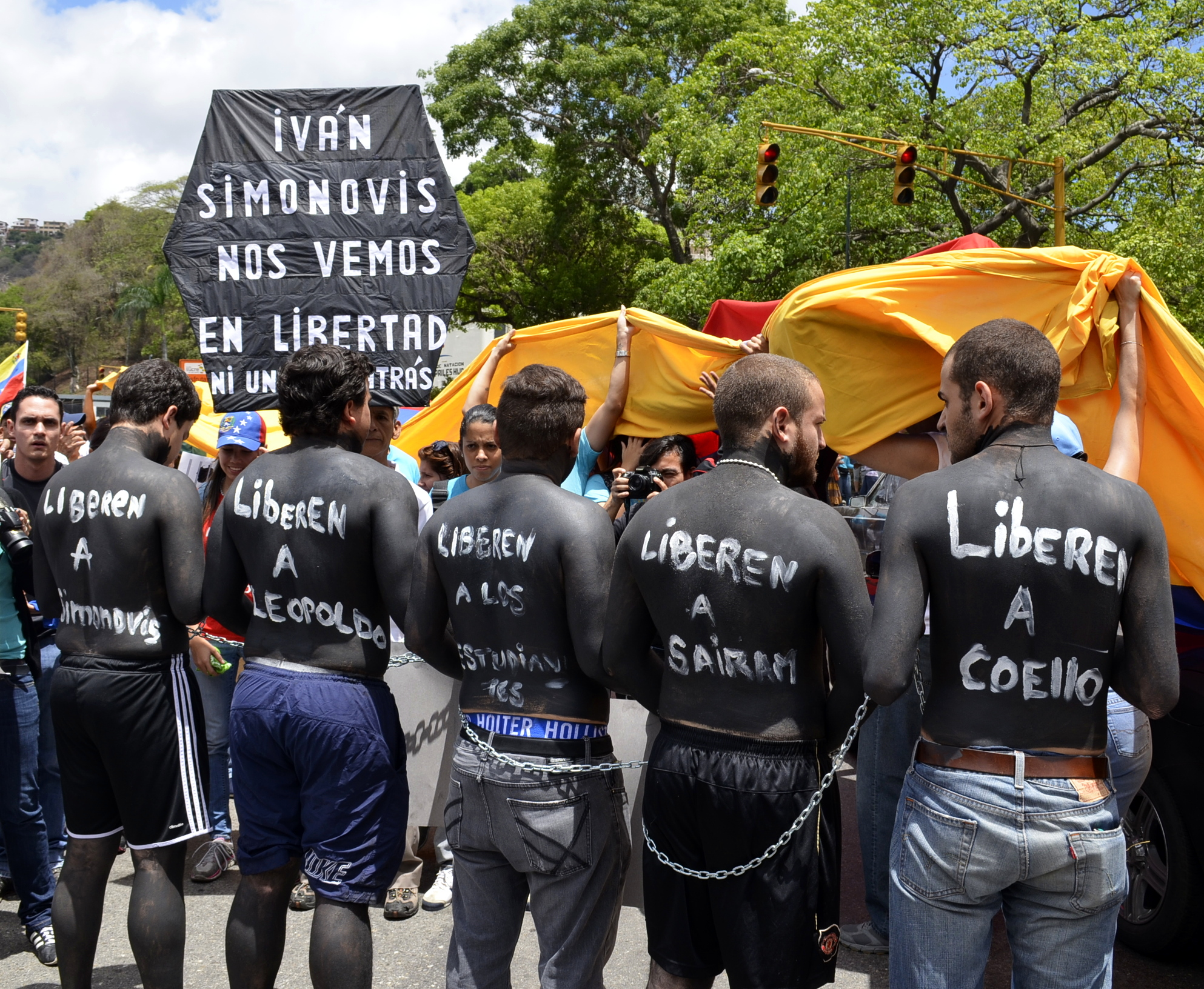
Protesters painted black and chained while demonstrating during the "March of the Brave" on 1 June.

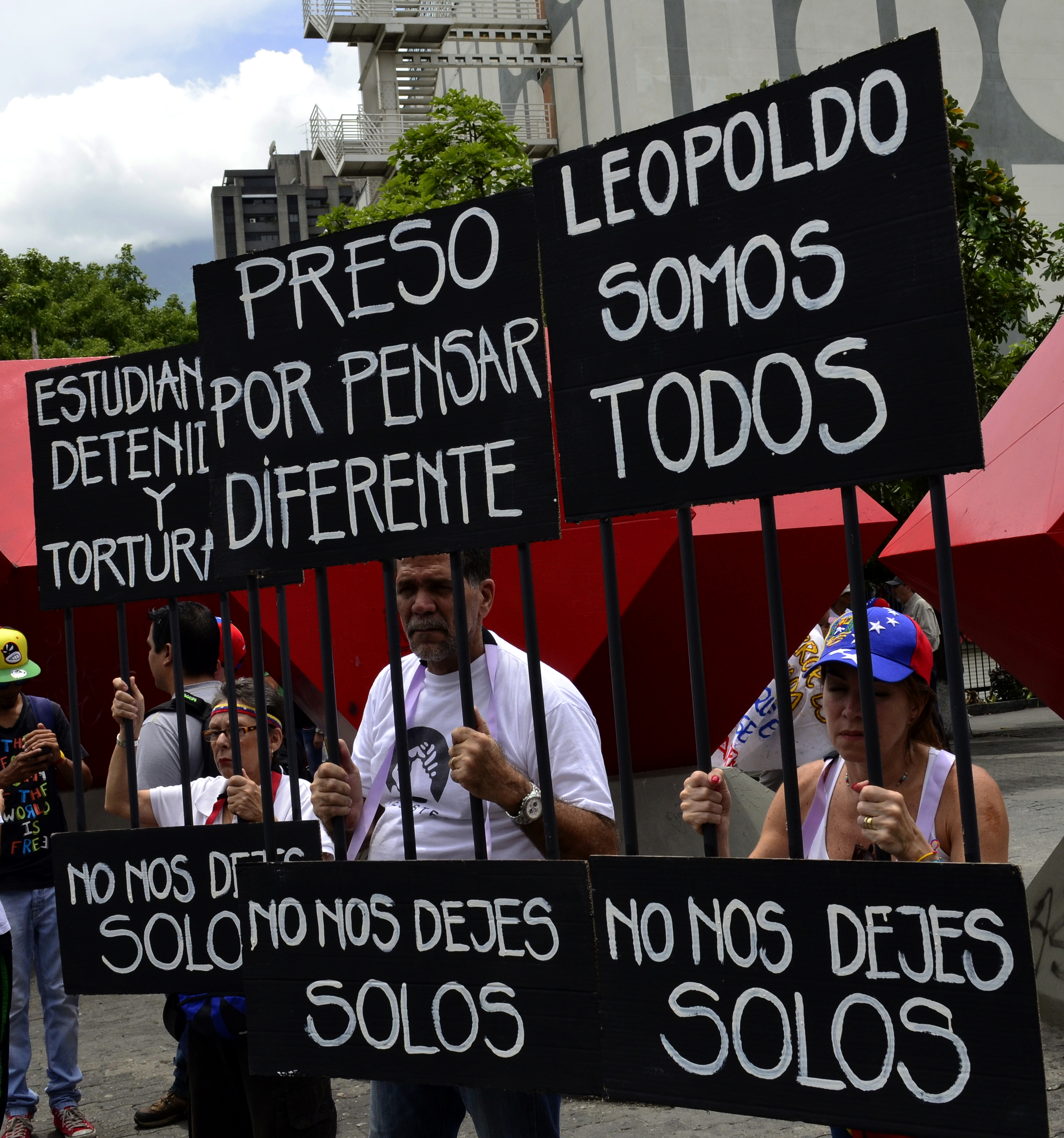
Protesters denouncing the arrests of fellow protesters and Leopoldo Lopez.

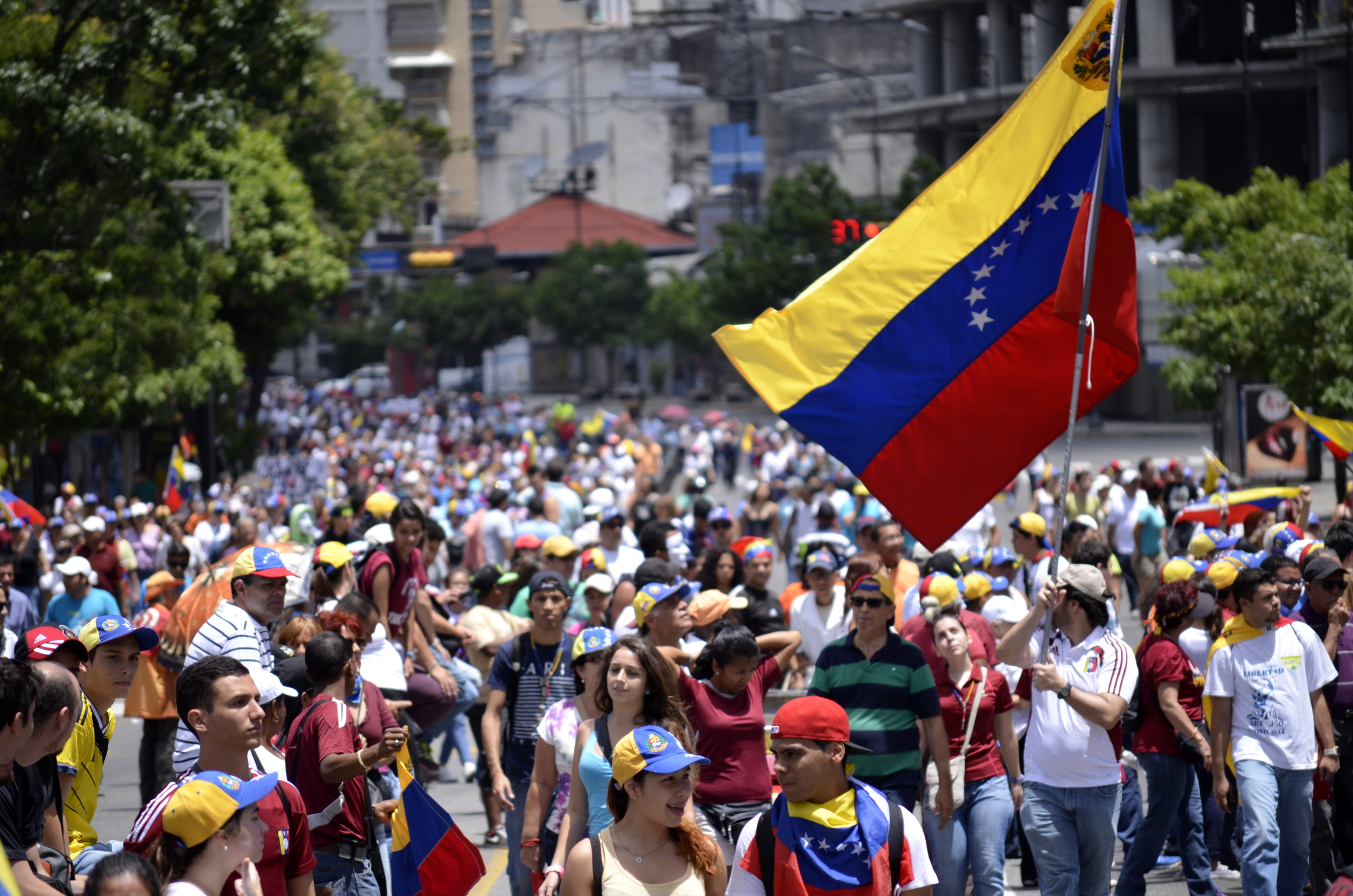
Groups of protesters during the "March for Independence" on 24 June.

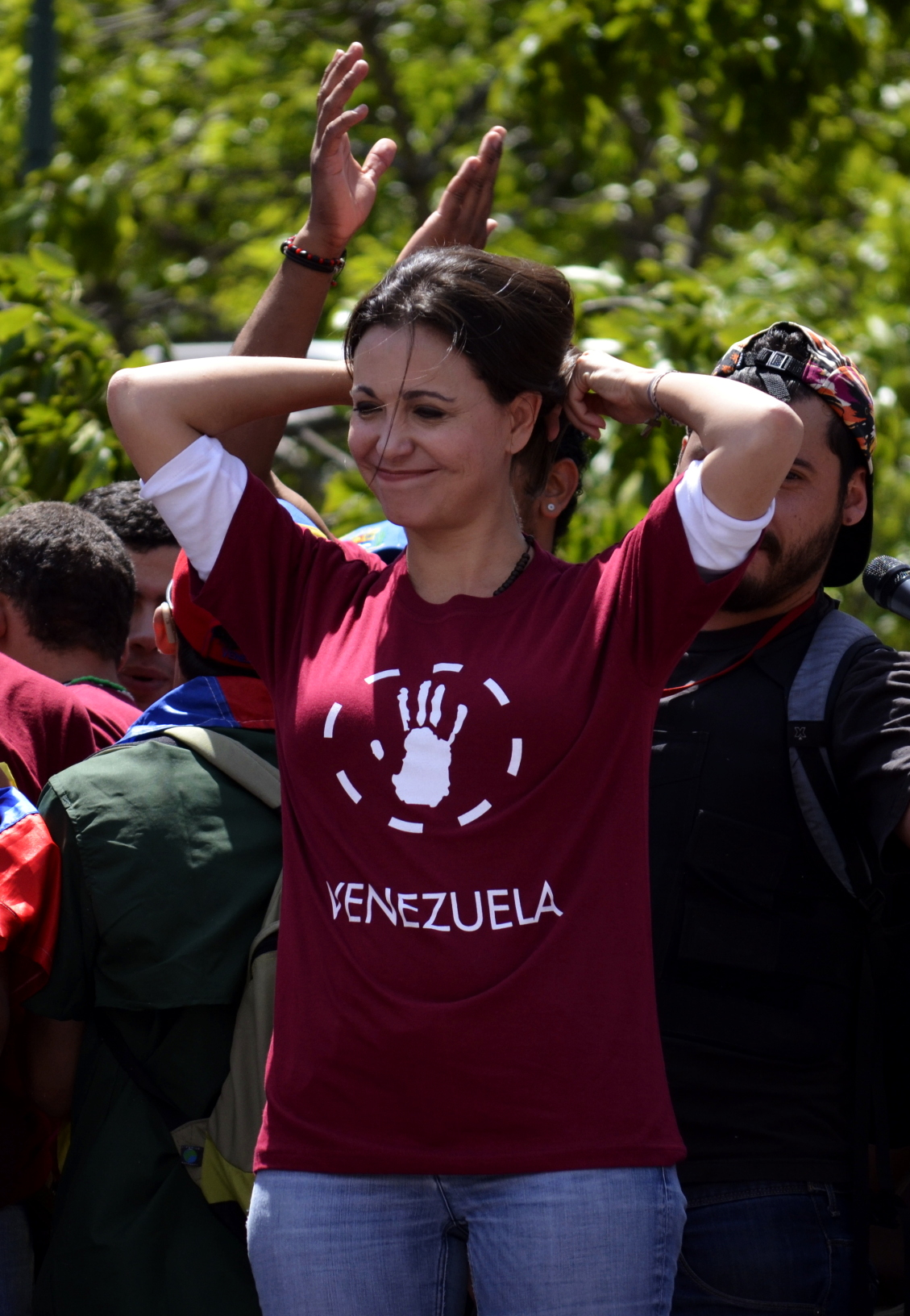
Maria Corina Machado putting on a Movimiento Estudiantil shirt during the 24 June rally.

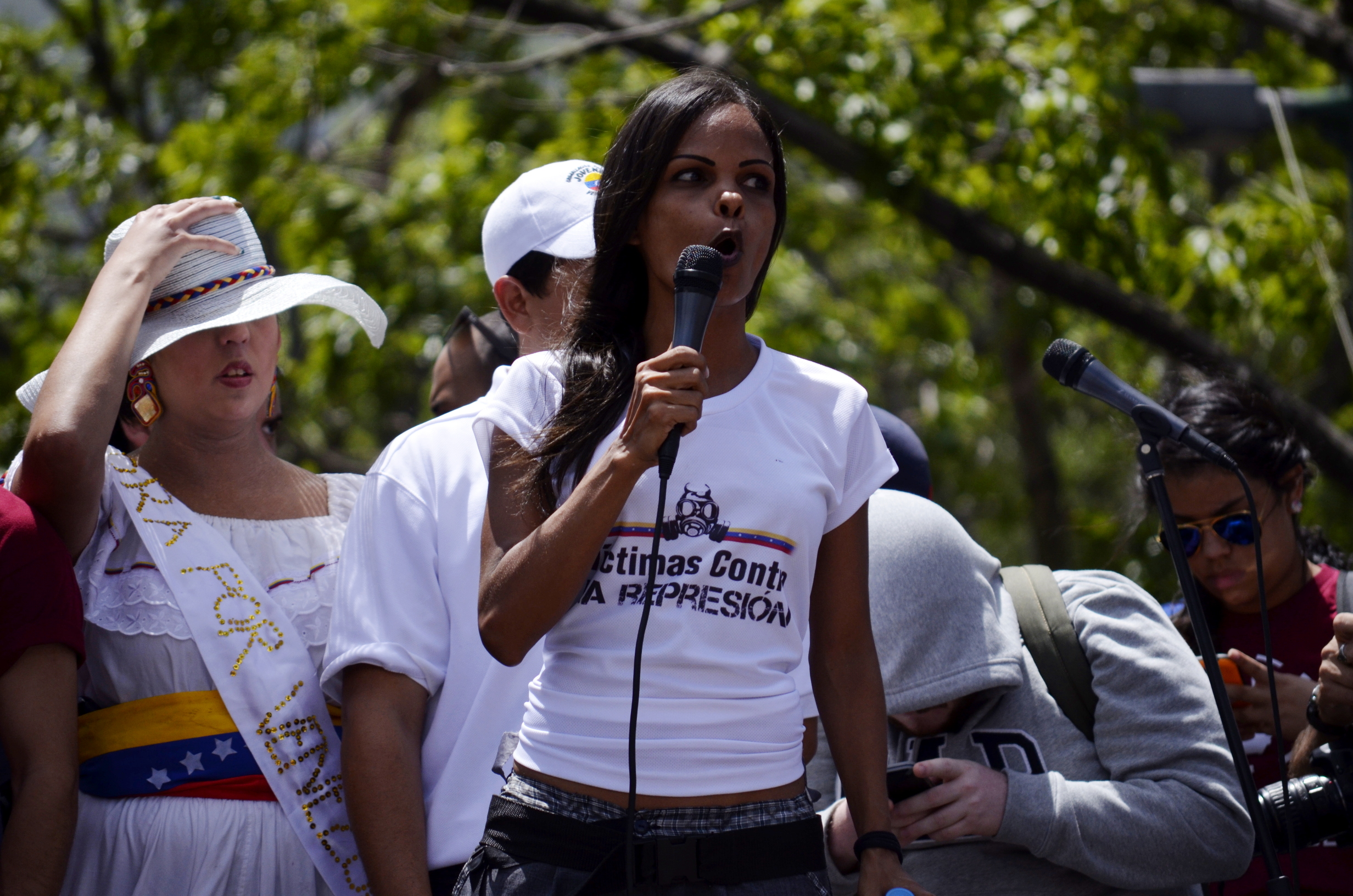
Marvinia Jiménez, a woman who was beaten by Venezuelan police officers, speaks at the 24 June rally.

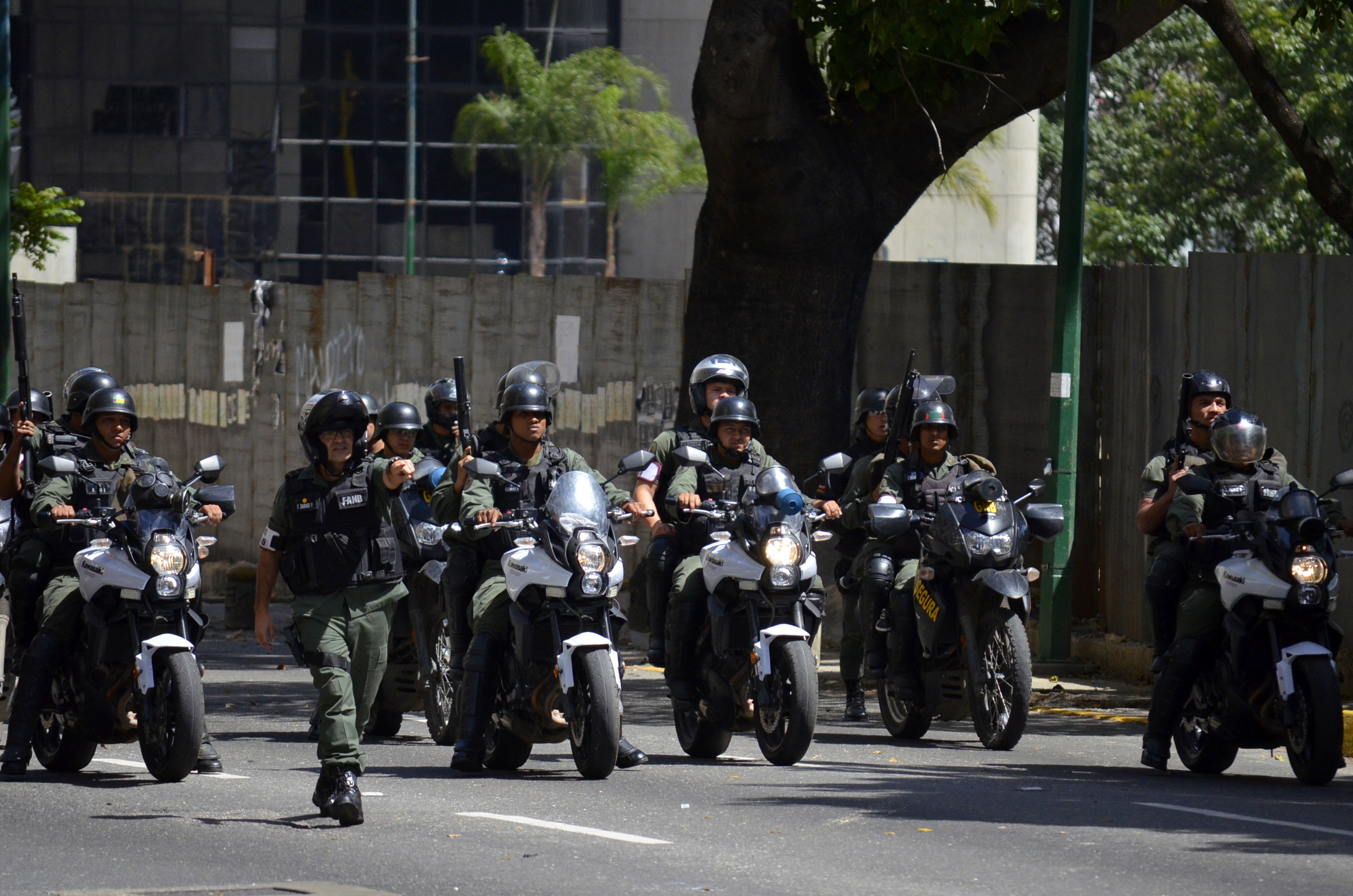
Venezuelan National Guard mobilizing to disperse the 24 June "March for Independence" rally.

- 1 June – The March of the Brave, a march organized by Movimiento Estudiantil, occurred in Caracas where Venezuelans denounced insecurity, shortages and demanded the release of political prisoners. Protesters then marched to Alfredo Sadel Square in Las Mercedes announcing they would stay in the square for 12 hours and said they would be fasting for another 15 hours.
- 2 June – Residents in Baruta protested against dirty drinking water and demanded Hidrocapital to come fix it. Students from the Catholic University of Táchira (UCAT) and National Experimental University of Táchira protested against the arrests of protesters and made two dump trucks spill their contents in the road in order to block traffic. Several of the students from UCAT were injured after clashes with security forces that used tear gas and buckshot to disperse protesters. Students from the University of Fermín Toro Barquisimeto protested against attacks that burned the school on 5 May by blocking nearby traffic. In Lara, three were injured and several were arrested after clashes between citizens and security forces occurred from the afternoon of 2 June to the early morning hours of 3 June.
- 3 June – In Valencia, protesters blocked a freeway with burning tires due to high levels of insecurity and because of the recent lack of water in the area. Clashes between the Metropolitan University and the National Police closed the Gran Mariscal de Ayacucho Highway and resulted in some fires from the use of tear gas. President Nicolas Maduro said on his talk show that the MUD had ceased dialogue concerning the protests. President Maduro also made claims that the United States and the Venezuelan opposition had plans to assassinate him saying Maria Corina Machado was involved, called her a "killer", and said that there was evidence from emails that he "did not want to publicly display".
- 4 June – Students from Metropolitan University and Santa María University held protests that resulted in clashes with the government that left 2 arrested and 5 injured. Protesters near the National Experimental University of Tachira burned a bus during demonstrations and were later dispersed by the National Guard with tear gas.
- 5 June – Judge Adriana Lopez decided that Leopoldo Lopez would face trial in August after being convicted of causing violence on 12 February 2014. Residents of Tocuyo protested due to the lack of domestic gas and because of bad tasting water.
- 6 June – Protests due to complications with utilities occurred in Maracay due to blackouts and in Caracas against the state-run water company, Hidrocapital, because residents had no water. Residents of Caracas protested against the Ministry of Tourism (MINTUR) due to the costs of air fare.
- 7 June – A leader from Popular Will, Freddy Guevara, asked Venezuelans across the country to protest for the release of Leopoldo Lopez, saying "Sunday will draw a new stage of the struggle of resistance, a path that has always been democratic." COPEI announced that they were seeking in every state of Venezuela, in various places in the United States, Colombia, Panama and Spain, to collect 1 million signatures to send to Pope Francis in petition to release political prisoners and to stop student repression. María Corina Machado also asked for protests for the following day saying it was time to enter a "second stage in the path of freedom".
- 8 June – Thousands of Venezuelans led by Popular Will peacefully gathered at Brión Plaza in Caracas protesting against Leopoldo Lopez's detention along with student arrests, demanded President Maduro's resignation and called for an early presidential election. Leaders of the student movement also announced that they would hold a demonstration on 24 June.
- 9 June – Multiple protests occurred due to the lack of water, with places like Saint Mary University, Caracas and Sucre all having demonstrations. Clashes between security forces and protesters in Maracaibo by a nearby school created anxiety among children and left several injured.
- 10 June – Several individuals in a vehicle traveling past Fermín Toro University fired a tear gas canister into the campus causing panic which was then followed by students blocking the streets in protest and clashes with police that lasted for hours. President Maduro stated that MUD did not respect the dialogue provided by UNASUR and the Catholic church.
- 11 June – Government workers at the Carabobo health ministry building protested near the facility demanding more benefits. Residents in Maturin protested for the improvement of public services; including better sewage, electricity and security services.
- 12 June – 12 were injured and classes were cancelled after a tear gas canister was placed into the university's air conditioning system which affected the entire facility. Students in Valencia blocked a highway while protesting and playing football. Students at Saint Mary University protested after the robbery and shooting of two of their fellow schoolmates.
- 13 June – Saint Mary University students continued protesting after the shooting of students there and placed desks facing the university's rectory demanding solutions to insecurity. Students in Lagunillas began protests once more and blocked several streets in the area while demonstrating against government abuses.
- 14 June – Clashes occurred between students and security forces in Bolívar which resulted in the use of tear gas near a residential center. Groups of cyclists, some nude, rode the streets in Caracas in protest and resulted in one cyclist being arrested.
- 15 June – More than 100 representatives from various social groups signed a manifest saying "yes there is a way out of the crisis" and demanded the resignation of President Nicolas Maduro saying, "only the people on the streets, exercising their legitimate right to peaceful protest will force those who now support the regime to accept a process truly democratic transition".
- 16 June – Students at St. Mary's University protested against insecurity due to the constant thefts occurring on their campus. In Valencia, parents protested against the education Resolution 058. Students from the Catholic University of Tachira gathered outside of the Governor of Tachira's home.
- 17 June – President Maduro confirmed his willingness to resume dialogue with the opposition.
- 18 June – María Corina Machado was prohibited from leaving the country due to investigations being performed by the government. President of the Student Center of Santa Rosa Catholic University, Eusebio Costa, sent a request to the United Nations in Switzerland, stating that the students were "confident" that their rights were violated and asked the United Nations "not be indifferent to what is happening in Venezuela". At Maiquetia Airport, workers protested, demanding a new collective agreement after alleged harassments and threats.
- 19 June – Students gathered outside of the Venezuelan headquarters of United Nations Program for Development demanding a copy of security footage of the dismantling of the protester camp that was in front of the headquarters. Students announced a march scheduled for 24 June in order to demand "freedom" for Venezuelans.
- 20 June – 5 protesters were arrested by the National Guard while demonstrating outside of the Catholic University of Táchira. National Guardsmen dispersed students who gathered in front of the United Nations Program for Development headquarters the previous day. Corpoelec workers of Puerto Ordaz in Bolívar state protested on Guayana Avenue.
- 21 June – Josué Farías, an accounting student from University Rafael Belloso Chacin, died of respiratory failure from injuries he sustained on 29 May during a protest in Zulia. 15 Youth National Organization members began their "permanent fasting" after rejecting the position of the United Nations in Caracas.
- 22 June – Hacker group Anonymous Venezuela hacked CANTV's website after several cities could not receive telephone and internet service. Coordinator of Popular Will, Carlos Vecchio, said that he had shown evidence to the United Nations alleged human rights violations, saying that "there must be a support of the international community, especially when violations occur human rights. No country can be oblivious to what is happening there". Opposition leaders were allegedly banned from flying on Conviasa flights in Venezuela due to "orders from Caracas".
- 23 June – Lilian Tintori stated in an interview with Chilean newspaper La Tercera that there is a struggle between good and evil in Venezuela, and that she thinks her husband Leopoldo Lopez will be released "soon" because there is not proof he had done nothing wrong.
- 24 June – Students from 14 states in Venezuela protested simultaneously on the 193rd anniversary of the Battle of Carabobo. In Valencia, 20 people were injured by the Carabobo police and the National Guard who were firing pellets and tear gas at peaceful protesters which resulted in some individuals retaliating by placing garbage into the streets in order to block them. In Anzoategui, more than 25 peaceful protesters were arrested while returning home. In Mérida, University of Los Andes students protested against what they called a Cuban "colonization" saying "Venezuela is still a colony of the Cuban government, we are slaves of insecurity, scarcity of inflation and all the problems that beset us every day to all Venezuelans". Students of the Catholic University of Tachira began a hunger strike asking for freedom of students who were arrested.
- 25 June – Students sewed their mouths shut in protest due to student being arrested for protesting and to show the Venezuelan government that their "fasting is permanent, prolonged and serious".
- 26 June – Movimiento Estudiantil of the Central University of Venezuela announced the movement titled Signatures for Freedom which would collect signatures to release hundreds of those in custody for protesting and to cease precautionary measures against another 2000 protesters. Neighborhood protests occurred in Barquisimeto due to a lack of water in the area.
- 27 June – The United Nations High Commissioner for Human Rights, Navi Pillay, said she was concerned about the violation of rights and abuses in Venezuela.
- 28 June – Executive Secretary of MUD, Ramon Guillermo Aveledo, said that dialogue has not permanently ceased with the Venezuelan government, saying "We have frozen the dialogue because it has not produced the expected results". At Plaza Bolivar of San Cristóbal, the state governor, José Gregorio Vielma Mora, held a meeting with the Battle Units Hugo Chávez, saying "we have to maintain the strength of the revolution, without allowing any internal division, especially in militancy of Tachira, where no one is disobedient, because the opposition is coming for us, because while the government builds, they destroy".
- 29 June – Students at the Chiquinquirá Church continued their hunger strike after nine days of fasting.
- 30 June – Students who continued to hunger strike in front of the Consulate of Colombia in San Cristobal asked the Congress of Colombian "not be complicit in the repression and violation of human rights in Venezuela".

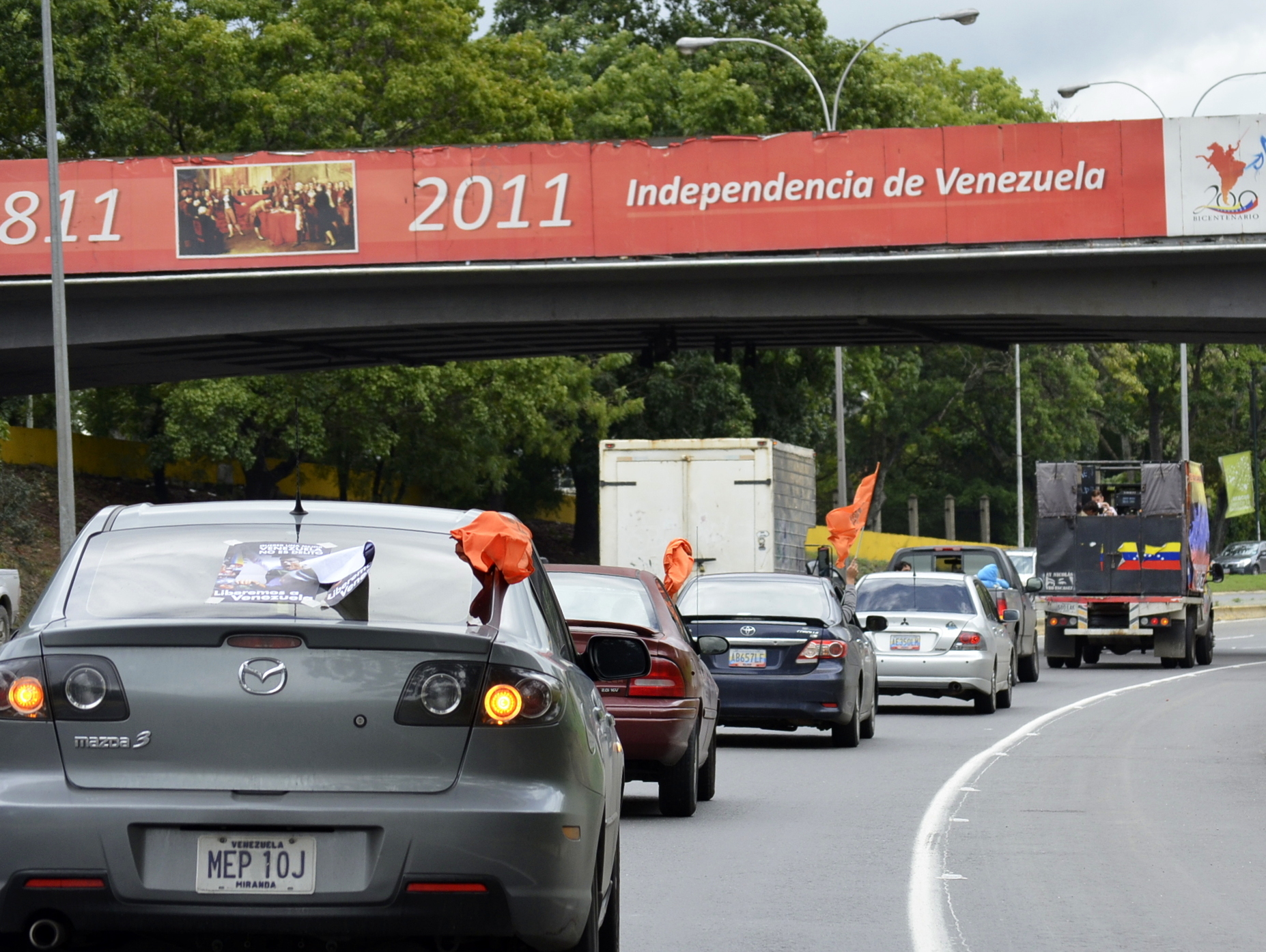
Caravan of citizens traveling to Ramo Verde on 26 July.

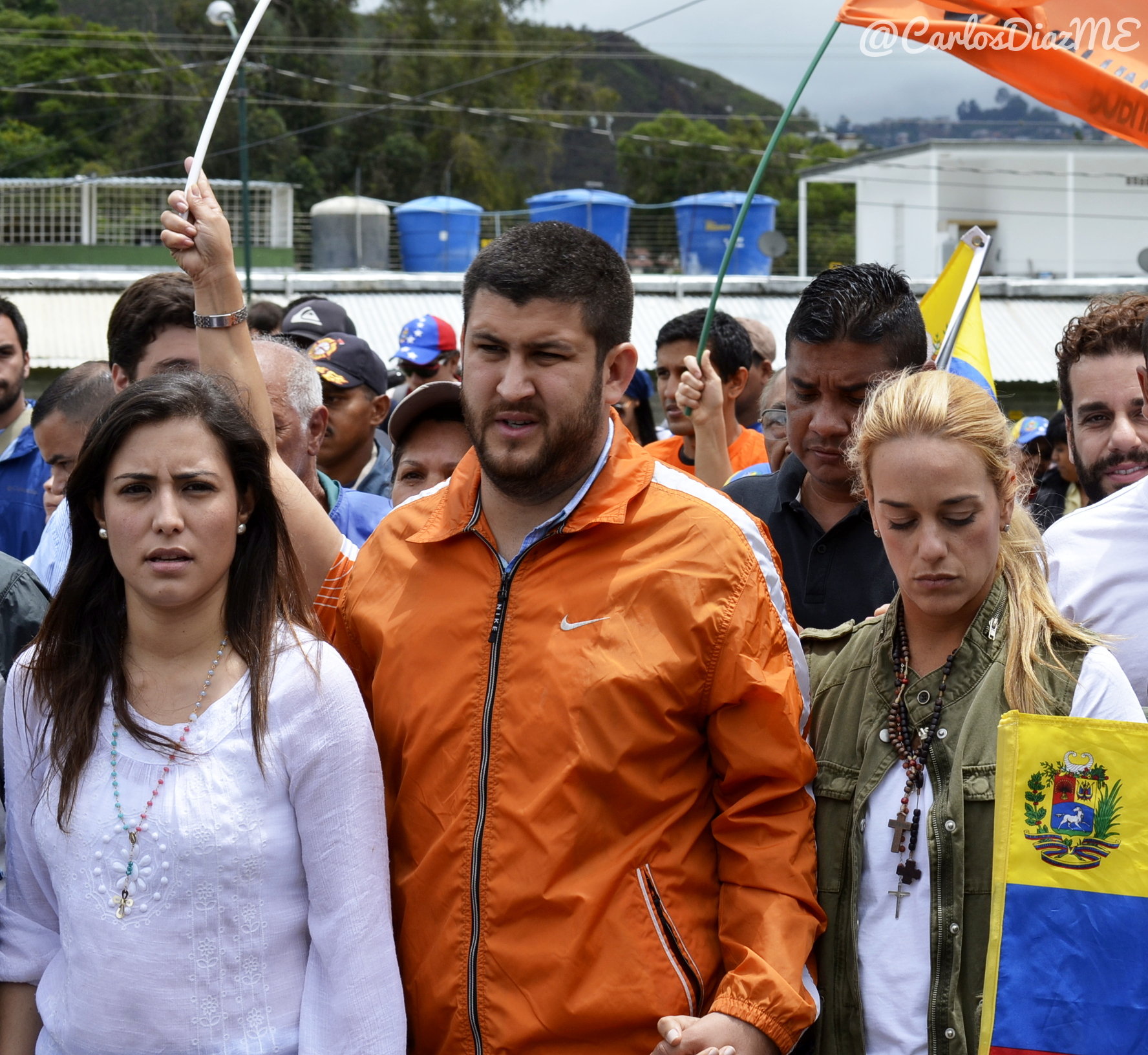
David Smolansky and Lilian Tintori, along with other supporters gathered at Ramo Verde.

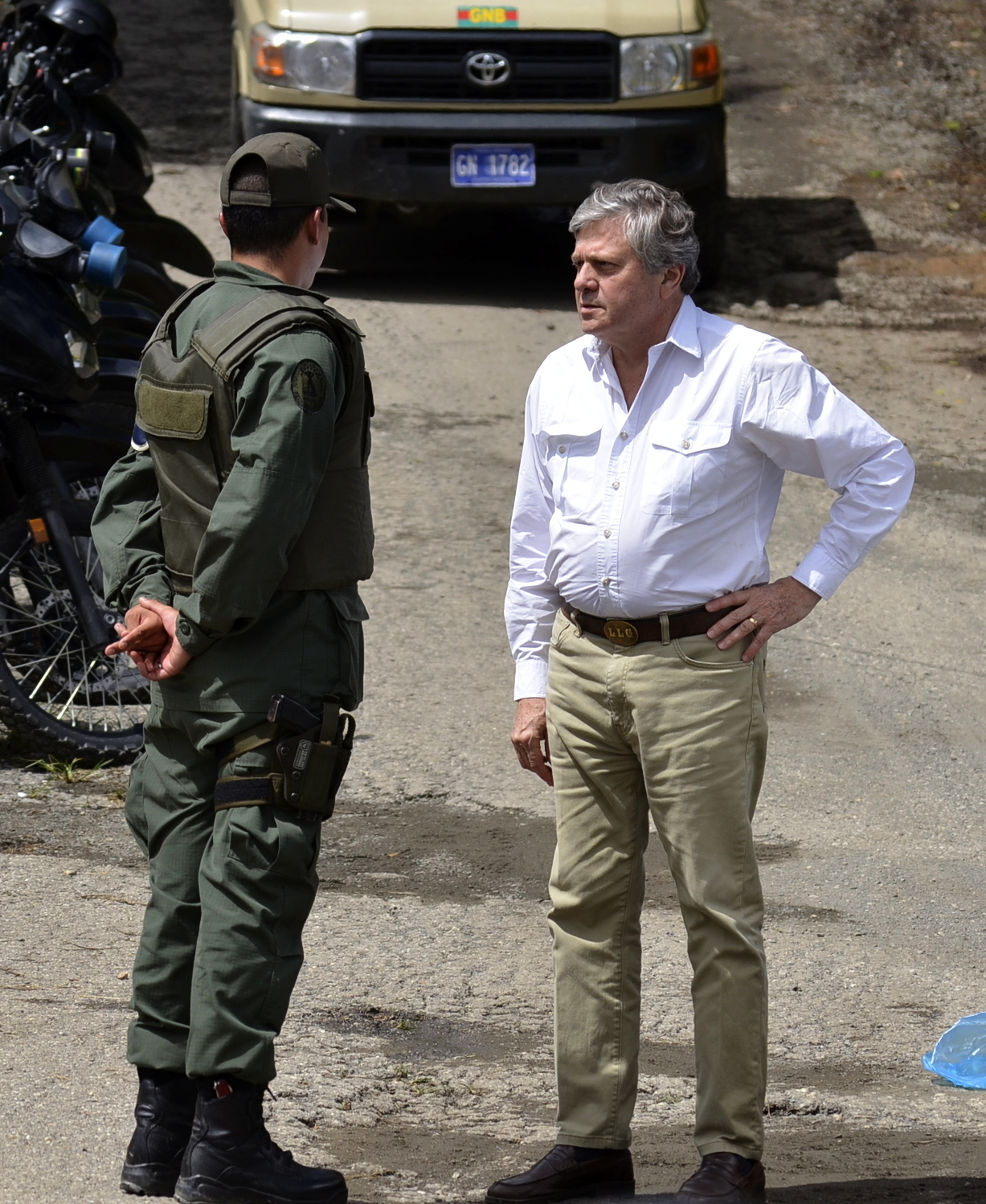
Father of Leopoldo Lopez speaking with a member of the Bolivarian National Guard.

- 1 July – Protests near the former headquarters of Catholic University of Táchira resulted in the several students being injured and one being arrested by the National Police.
- 2 July – A large group of merchants in Candelaria protested after a 77-year-old baker was killed after the community paid their 500 bolivar protection fees to the People's Guard for security. Judicial sources announced that Leopoldo Lopez will face trial on 23 July. Heavy clashes occurred between protesters and security forces in Tachira after protesters demonstrated against the murder and kidnapping of a young woman the previous night.
- 3 July – Students of the Catholic University of Táchira and the Santiago Mariño Polytechnic Institute continued to protest after the kidnapping and murder that occurred the previous Sunday. Near Santiago Mariño Polytechnic Institute, students blocked roads with garbage which resulted with no escalation after police and protesters reached an agreement of a short protest that would not block roads. However near the Catholic University of Táchira, National Police forcibly repressed protesters there launching tear gas without notice in the streets and through windows which resulted in students retaliating with stone and Molotov cocktails. Between 20 and 30 injuries were reported and an NTN24 reporter was temporarily detained and allegedly beaten.
- 4 July – Workers of the state-run Corpoelec protested due to collective agreement issues saying they are still owed pay from 2011 and demanded the Minister for Electricity, Jesse Chacón, to deny that blackouts were due to sabotage. Protests occurred at the University of Carabobo where an entrance was closed in protest of the arrest of a student that was allegedly robbed and then arrested after he was robbed.
- 5 July – Student movements and the public commemorated 203 years since Venezuela's independence. During a demonstration at the Plaza de la República, protesters symbolically washed a Venezuelan flag to represent a "renewal of the nation" and made statements about independence from Cuba. Following the demonstration, members of SEBIN arrested 17 protesters who complied with their orders due to "public offense to patriotic symbols". Protesters near Terrazas del Avila blocked access to a road, preventing a PDVSA oil truck and resulted with the National Guard dispersing the protesters with tear gas.
- 6 July – On the corner where Bassil Da Costa was shot, a memorial plaque was placed to remember Bassil Da Costa and Juancho Montoya, two of the first victims killed during the protests. 12 of the students arrested the previous day for washing a Venezuelan flag were released while 4 still remained in custody.
- 7 July – A large number of over a dozen students of the Venezuelan National Youth Organization who were having a hunger strike in a Chiquinquirá Catholic church stopped their fasting after 17 days, saying that intimidation from the National Guard and SEBIN, along with a siege of the church by paramilitary groups permitted by Venezuelan state authorities caused them to conclude their strike. However a few students continued their fasting. Parents protested in Valencia against Resolution 058 calling it the "plan of the Fatherland". Citizens of Simón Planas in Lara state protested against insecurity, saying that they had talked to government officials about the issue but the situation did not improve.
- 8 July – A steel worker union involving workers of SIDOR protested in Guyana due to the worst operating inefficiencies in its history. Workers blocked roads with buses with some catching accidentally catching on fire. The workers later apologized to the citizens in the area for any inconveniences during their protests. In Baruta, protesters barricaded Bello Monte Avenue while denouncing shortages and insecurity in the area.
- 9 July – Students in Mérida protested against insecurity, blocking Tulio Febres Cordero Avenue. This resulted in clashes with police using tear gas and rubber bullets near the Faculty of Medicine of the University of Los Andes. Andrés Bello Catholic University asked authorities to release students, saying that the demonstrations should not be punished since students should have freedom of expression and asked authorities to investigate allegations of torture and degradation.
- 10 July – Protesters demonstrated in the Santa Fe neighborhood of Caracas, partially blocking the Prados del Este highway, placing trash and debris in three of the four lanes of the roadway. President Maduro stated that in east Caracas, makeshift weapons were found belonging to some protesters. Residents of La Guaira in Vargas state protested against the lack of water in the area by blocking roads. Pot banging in protest could be heard from the poor, "pro-Chavez" barrio of 23 de Enero, denouncing more than 24 hours without electricity.
- 11 July – Militant members of PSUV made statements demanding " radical change" from the Venezuelan government and criticized President Maduro, saying that it seems like he is "running out of answers" and is sometimes going "the wrong way".
- 12 July – Residents of Barcelona in Anzoategui state protested by burning tires in roads, explaining that they were angry for not having electricity for at least 4 days.
- 13 July – Former Vice President of Venezuela and journalist for the Venezuelan government's news agency AVN, José Vicente Rangel, warned government supporters of "terrorist attacks" occurring in mid-July, saying that the protests had left 42 dead, over 300 injured and 10 billion bolivares of damages.
- 14 July – Leader of MUD said that dialogue with the government would continue after the release of what he called were "political prisoners". María Corina Machado said that criminal proceedings were initiated against her by the government without her knowledge; with Machado being accused of public incitement during violent occurrences in February.
- 15 July – On their 22nd consecutive day of fasting, Venezuelan National Youth Organization members continued their hunger strike still denouncing the arrests of fellow students, hoping they could conclude their protest on 12 August. Clashes between students and authorities occurred in Mérida after protests against insecurity, economic problems and the name change of the state of Mérida to the "Bolivarian State of Merida". A student of medicine at the University of Los Andes was arrested after the protests and was allegedly "brutally beaten and badly wounded".
- 16 July – Trauma patients in Barcelona protested outside of a hospital saying their operations had been delayed for months after medical residents began a strike.
- 17 July – After National Police tried to disperse a peaceful protest, clashes were generated between students of the National Experimental Universidad of Tachira and the police.
- 18 July – In the early hours of the night, clashes occurred in Táchira between police and protesters which resulted in damages to nearby businesses, and dozens of burnt vehicles in a parking lot belonging to the police. Residents of Libertador protested on Antímano Avenue due to a lack of gas. Former workers of Sabenpe protested for the payment of their salaries on Petare-Santa Lucia Road, closing more than 1 km of road. Workers of the state-run steel produce Sidor protested for a second time against the president of the Venezuelan Guayana Corporation, Justo Noguera Pietri, over collective agreement issues. The workers blocked traffic in and out of Ciudad Guayana for 4 hours.
- 19 July – Ombudswoman Gabriela Ramirez reported that her office studied the arrests of Leopoldo López, Commissioner Ivan Simonovis, and Marco Coello and that the Venezuelan government is attempting to protect their rights
- 20 July – Former mayor who was arrested, Daniel Ceballos, called on the people of Táchira to continue protesting.
- 21 July – In Puerto Ordaz, Bolivar, workers of Sidor protested and created barricades. In Boconó, residents protested and blocked access to Zumbador due to the poor conditions of roads in the area.
- 22 July – Protesters in Valencia placed banners throughout the city criticizing the quality of water, electricity, security, health and education. Sidor workers demanding a collective agreement protested once again closing multiple roads in Guyana. Parents of those arrested for protesting outside of the UNDP building in Caracas protested outside of the building asking for the UN to make statements and denounced alleged human rights violations of their children.
- 23 July – In Boconó, several barricades were placed by residents protesting against failures in water services, municipal cleaning and electrical faults to which they are subjected. In Ciudad Bolívar, clashes between the National Guard and protesters occurred. Parents that were protesting outside of the UNDP building were asked to leave by Polichacao officers and were told that the National Guard would remove them if they did not comply.
- 24 July – Residents in Lara and Mérida marched from Ayacucho de Barquisimeto Square to Bolivar Plaza to commemorate Bolivar's birthday and denounce. After the march, clashes occurred in Barquisimeto and Mérida between protesters who set up barricades and the National Guard who proceeded to disperse them. In Barquisimeto, 13 were arrested and 2 were injured.
- 25 July – Wives of opposition leaders who were arrested said that President Maduro would be responsible for their husbands wellbeing after Scarano and Lucchese were allegedly beaten. The wives also accused the government of lying about Leopoldo Lopez's freedom, saying that photos released showing him in church were from a different period of time.
- 26 July – A caravan of supporters drove to Ramo Verde prison demanding to visit opposition leaders imprisoned there. Parents of students that were arrested protested outside of the HP Tower in Los Palos Grandes, Chacao municipality.
- 27 July – The Venezuelan Armed Forces warned the workers of Sidor who were protesting in Ciudad Guyana that they would be patrolling the area and would take action against the workers if necessary.
- 28 July – 83 people were arrested in Cumana after 27 separate pockets of protests denouncing alleged human rights violations broke out near the police headquarters.
- 29 July – Mother of Geraldine Moreno, a woman killed while protesting, demanded through social media that the 8 students detained after the dismantling of the camp near the UNDP headquarters be released.
- 30 July – Members of National Front gathered in front of the SEBIN headquarters denouncing abuses that protesters faced and demanded the release of political prisoners. While María Corina Machado was participating in a town meeting in Caricuao, Caracas, over 30 people belonging to colectivos attacked her vehicle leaving it heavily damaged. Machado escaped and was then moved to the assembly place while colectivos followed breaking down the door where they then left the scene after confrontations with residents protecting Machado.
- 31 July – Auto workers in Caracas protested at Plaza Caracas denouncing the country's situation in the automotive sector and stated that the allocation of currency is under their control.
- 1 August – The National Union of Court Employees (SINTRAT) marched from the Caracas Courthouse to the headquarters of the Vice President demanding a wage increase.
- 2 August – Multiple government officials held demonstrations in support of the Palestinian people with a large protest held by pro-government protesters at Plaza Morelos de Caracas in Caracas.
- 3 August – Residents of Candelaria threatened to restart protests in the neighborhood following the murder of a woman, saying that though there were some minor improvements after an earlier murder, they still demand to meet with Minister Miguel Rodriguez Torres.
- 4 August – On Henry Ford Avenue in Valencia, a transport vehicle was burnt in protest. In Baruta, protesters burned tires and created road blockages. Near the Catholic University of Táchira, clashes between protesters and security forces left 10 people injured with one hit by a tear gas canister.
- 5 August – In Barquisimeto, protesters closed Lara Avenue for 5 hours while burning tires and were later dispersed by security forces with rubber pellets and tear gas resulting in one arrest. In Choroní, residents protested for a second day denouncing the poor public services and overflowing sewers in the area with the protesters being dispersed later in the night.
- 6 August – In Salamanca, protesters blocked the Charallave-Ocumare highway due to having no drinking water and violence in the area that left 6 people dead. Sidor workers held another protest, closing Guayana Avenue with buses resulting in one worker being arrested.
- 7 August – A caravan of taxi drivers caused blockages of traffic in Los Teques protested against insecurity in the area after a 71-year-old partner of a taxi driver was killed by a bullet wound to the neck.
- 8 August – Deputy Chairman of the Federation of Student Center at UCV, the youth leader of Aragua, the president of the UDI Youth and a Chilean student among two others were arrested by SEBIN. The Independent Democratic Union party (UDI) of Chile promptly responded to the arrest of its leader, Felipe Cuevas, demanding an "immediate release". The Chilean ambassador in Venezuela explained that the Chilean student politician may be released soon saying he was arrested for taking photographs in an unauthorized area and not having his passport upon him.
- 9 August – Students leaders and a Chilean politician that were arrested the previous days were released.
- 10 August – The Ecological Movement of Venezuela, along with other social groups announced that they would hold a protest in Ciudad Guayana on 13 August due to insecurity, the disposal of garbage and food shortages.
- 11 August – After weeks of protesting, Sidor workers protested once again on Guayana Avenue resulting in one worker injured after he was hit by two shotgun pellets while the National Guard dispersed them.
- 12 August – Sidor workers protested against the arrest of 19 workers the previous day and were dispersed by the National Guard who were using tear gas and buckshot, resulting in two individuals, a Sidor worker and a bystander, being injured from shotgun the pellets.
- 13 August – Groups gathered outside of the courthouse with signs and shouting slogans, demanding the release of Leopoldo Lopez.
- 14 August – 112 of 120 protesters arrested outside of the UNDP headquarters in Caracas on 8 May received full freedom, with the remaining 8 protesters remaining detained due to alleged greater crimes.
- 15 August – In Tucacas, Falcon State, residents protested against the rate increase from 5 bolívares for entrance to the park, to between 80 and 150 bolívares to enter Morrocoy National Park, with the protests resulting in 3 people injured and 7 arrested by the National Guard.
- 16 August – In Vargas state, resident of Montesano protested over the lack of water in their neighborhoods.
- 17 August – In San Cristóbal, public transport drivers protested against outside of a government-run PDV gas station due to the poor quality of service of the gas station.
- 18 August – During a visit in Valencia, Cardinal Jorge Urosa Savino called for justice for the murder cases of Geraldin Moreno and Genesis Carmona, and walso made statements denouncing the "injustice" being committed against arrested opposition leaders.
- 19 August – A protest over the poor condition of roads in the area occurred on Petare-Santa Lucia road at La Dolorita in Sucre municipality caused heavy traffic on roads nearby.
- 20 August – In La Dolorita on Petare-Santa Lucia road, residents caused back ups in traffic while protesting once again while protesting against the bad conditions of roads nearby. In San Cristóbal, residents protested against the lack of gas in the area by blocking roads. Residents of multiple municipalities in Caracas protested outside of the Corpoelec headquarters denouncing the daily blackouts that occurred in their neighborhoods. In Lara state, residents along with members of Movimiento Esudantil protested outside of the University Central Hospital Antonio Maria Pineda de Barquisimeto and the poor condition of healthcare in the country.
- 21 August – Libertador municipality councilor, Jesus Armas along with residents and Primero Justicia supporters protested in El Paraíso Parish against the healthcare crisis in Venezuela while handing out flyers explaining the severity of the situation. Popular Will leader Ismael León led a protest denouncing unpunished murders in Venezuela and criticized how minister Miguel Rodríguez Torres handled the situation. In Caracas, residents protested outside of the headquarters of the state water company Hidrocapital against discolored water and water rationing, with one community leader delivering a document to Hidrocapital from 22 parishes in Caracas explaining the situation residents were facing with their water.
- 22 August – Gerardo Carrero, the National Coordinator of the Youth Organization Venezuelans who was arrested by SEBIN on 8 May, along with other prisoners declared a hunger strike demanding the release of other students who are detained in Venezuela. Carrero also shared a letter he wrote to President Maduro asking him to tolerate political opponents.
- 23 August – In Valencia, a protest occurred inside of a government-run Bicentenario supermarket on Bolivar Avenue due to the lack of goods inside of the store.
- 24 August – Jesus Ramirez, student representative of the Venezuelan Youth Organization, stated that the hunger strike of Gerardo Carrero and other prisoners would not cease until full freedom of those arrested is met, also stating that student protests would occur again if demand were not met, asking for the UN commission and the Organization of American States come to check the alleged violation of human rights in Venezuela.
- 25 August – Large protests reappeared in Caracas, the municipality of Chacao, San Cristóbal, and Tachira, mainly due to the redesigned proposal of food rationing by President Maduro and economic problems according to the Agence France-Presse and El Universal. In Chacao, barricades of burning trash bags and tires appeared in the morning. Barricades also appeared in San Cristóbal during the early morning hours where the National Guard responded by trying to disperse protesters with tear gas and rubber bullets, and damaged a residential buildings gate after ramming it when pursuing protesters. Protesters then responded with Molotov cocktails, which injured one guardsman with burns. In Santa Fe, protesters demonstrated against President Maduro and his advisors, with the protest resulting with the National Guard dispersing individuals with tear gas and 6 protesters arrested.
- 26 August – In Valencia, a group of protesters gathered in Bolivar Avenue to denounce the alleged indoctrination of children by the Venezuelan government.
- 27 August – Residents in Los Teques blocked a street while protesting to be relocated. Students of the Universidad Privada Dr. Rafael Belloso Chacín (URBE) protested against the proposed food rationing system, food shortages and asked for President Maduro to resign while demonstrating in northern Maracaibo. The Zulia State Police responded to the demonstrations, closing roads near the university and dispersed the protesters.
- 28 August – Multiple supporters of Leopoldo Lopez gather outside of the courthouse where his fourth trial was held 6 months after his imprisonment. Numerous protests occurred denouncing the new fingerprint rationing system proposed by President Maduro. The MUD reactivated protests by calling on supporters to hold a nationwide Cacerolazo at 8:00 pm local time against the proposed system. The banging of pots from the Cacerolazo could be heard in several states. In the Libertador Municipality of Caracas, residents protested by blocking a road in the area. In Santa Fe, protesters blocked multiple roads in the area which resulted in the arrest of two students following clashes with the National Guard, which launched tear gas at residents on the streets and in nearby buildings.
- 29 August – COPEI announced that demonstrations were organized for the next day, 30 August, in order to denounce the proposed fingerprint food system and that the march is to begin at the COPEI headquarters in El Bosque and end at the headquarters of the Superintendency of Fair Prices. Primero Justicia also held a meeting, calling on Venezuelans to reject the proposed system and called for peaceful protesting.
- 30 August – COPEI held their march to the headquarters of the Superintendency of Fair Prices, denouncing the proposed fingerprint system and stated that the Venezuelan government was responsible for food shortages. In Chacao, barricades were placed in several streets with the protests ending due to the National Police dispersing them with tear gas.
- 31 August – Members of the Movimiento Estudiantil protested outside multiple Venezuelan churches asking for intervention of the Church with student arrests and alleged torturing by Venezuelan authorities.
- 1 September – In Baruta, transportation workers caused heavy traffic backups while blocking roads in protest. In Los Alpes, residents protested by blocking the Pan American highway, demanding the state water company Hidrocapital finish projects in the area. In Tachira, residents protested against the proposed fingerprint system which resulted in 6 injured protesters following clashes with authorities who were trying to disperse them.
- 2 September – Motorcyclists protested in Los Ruices by blocking roads and causing heavy congestion. Outside of a Bicentennial Supermarket in Las Mercedes, Primero Justicia supporters protested against the proposed fingerprinting system for goods.
- 3 September – COPEI assigned 5000 supporters to collect petitions against the proposed fingerprint purchasing system.
- 4 September – Dioris Albarrán, Anderson Briceño and Abril Tovar, the final students who were still arrested after the dismantling of a camp outside of the UN headquarters in Caracas on 8 May, were released.
- 5 September – The Bolivarian National Police evicted COPEI members collecting signatures denouncing a proposed fingerprint system in La Candelaria. Doctors, nurses and patients protested outside of the José Manuel de los Ríos Children's Hospital denouncing the condition of the hospital, which supposedly lacked resources, had falling ceilings and sewage leaks.
- 6 September – The NGO Venezuelan Penal Forum announced that it will continue to assist those detained in anti-government protests and that they may also expand their assistance.
- 7 September – Lorent Saleh Gomez and Gabriel Valleys, members of the NGO Operation Freedom who organized protests, were expelled from Colombia allegedly "for violation of the immigration laws of the country" and were later detained by SEBIN.
- 8 September – In Miranda, protesters blocked traffic for 2 hours asking for improvements in education.
- 9 September – Students of the Catholic University Andres Bello (UCAB) called on Venezuelans to reject the proposed fingerprint food purchasing system and organized a gathering at Plaza Alfredo Sadel on 12 September.
- 10 September – The fourth hearing of Leopoldo Lopez was held at the Palace of Justice.
- 11 September – President of COPEI, Roberto Enríquez, asked the Supreme Court to withdraw the proposed fingerprint purchasing system and presented 726,000 signatures from Venezuelans who denounced the proposed system.
- 12 September – In Bellomonte, a group of students gathered in memorial of Bassil Da Costa near the place of his death and remembered 7 months since the protests began. Students began to block a street when authorities began to disperse protesters with tear gas and arrested more than 20.
- 13 September – After a morning of alleged Colectivo activity in Barquisimeto, student protesters began to block roads in the area which resulted in Venezuelan authorities raiding an apartment complex and arresting multiple individuals. Protests in Caracas also caused clashes between authorities and protesters that resulted in a total of 64 protesters arrested. In San Cristobal, protests occurred denouncing the proposed fingerprint system. President Maduro made statements following the "flare ups" of protests in August and September, saying, "We are not going to have even a minimum of tolerance with the protests ... I will have no hesitation in ensuring peace and justice, which is what the people want".
- 14 September – Law professionals and families of those arrested in Barquisimeto reported that the arrested individuals have been unable to communicate. Supporters for those arrested also gathered outside of the National Building in Lara.
- 15 September – Near the University of the Andes (ULA), clashes were reported between the National Guard and protesters. 6 arrested individuals involved in the 12 September Monte Bello protests were deprived of liberty along with other involved protesters who were prohibited from leaving the jurisdiction. Workers of Bolivarian Airports protested due to collective bargaining issues.
- 16 September – Students arrested for peacefully protesting in Anzoategui were released.
- 17 September – In the Píritu barrio of Petare, residents protested due to not having water for up to 6 months and denounced the inaction by both the Venezuelan government and its water company, Hidrocapital.
- 18 September – The trial for former Mayor of San Cristóbal, Daniel Ceballos, has its first hearing.
- 19 September – In Sucre, traders protested due to the lack of being able to find work in the area.
- 20 September – COPEI organized protests in six municipalities of Barlovento, which each protested against various issues including power outages, insecurity, water shortages and rationing.
- 21 September – The Venezuelan government's Public Prosecutors Office charged more students for being involved with Lorent Saleh Gomez and his alleged conspiracy of rebellion charges.
- 22 September – The government released a video showing Lorent Saleh Gomez, a student opposition activist involved in organizing the anti-government protests, discussing his plans to organize terrorist groups, in Colombia, and to return to Venezuela to carry out targeted assassinations and plant explosives in the country.
- 23 September – Traders between Colombia and Venezuela protested on the border blocking access on the Simon Bolivar bridge denouncing border closures.
- 24 September – Groups of drivers protested on the Colombia-Venezuela border, blocking passage due to the night time blockages the Venezuelan government had installed.
- 25 September – Pepsi workers in Valencia after 175 workers were sent home due to the lack of materials to produce Yukery juice and Lipton tea.
- 26 September – Lilian Tintori, along with deputy national coordinator of People's Will, Freddy Guevara, gathered with supporters outside of the UN headquarters in Caracas demanding the release of what they called political prisoners held by the Venezuelan government. Several young supporters marched with Tintori to the UN building and then departed from her to demonstrate at Atamira Square.
- 27 September – Citizens in the Bolívar municipality protested over alleged abuses that they were suffering from military personnel in the area.
- 28 September – Popular Will began collecting signatures to create a Constituent Assembly calling for the resignation of President Maduro.
- 29 September – At the University of Oriente, students closed gates to the campus to draw attention to their food, safety and other problems they were facing.
- 30 September – Beginning at about noon, students at the Central University of Venezuela protested, closing Plaza Venezuela and caused the National Guard along with the National Police to respond. In Miranda, traders protested in Francisco de Miranda Avenue.

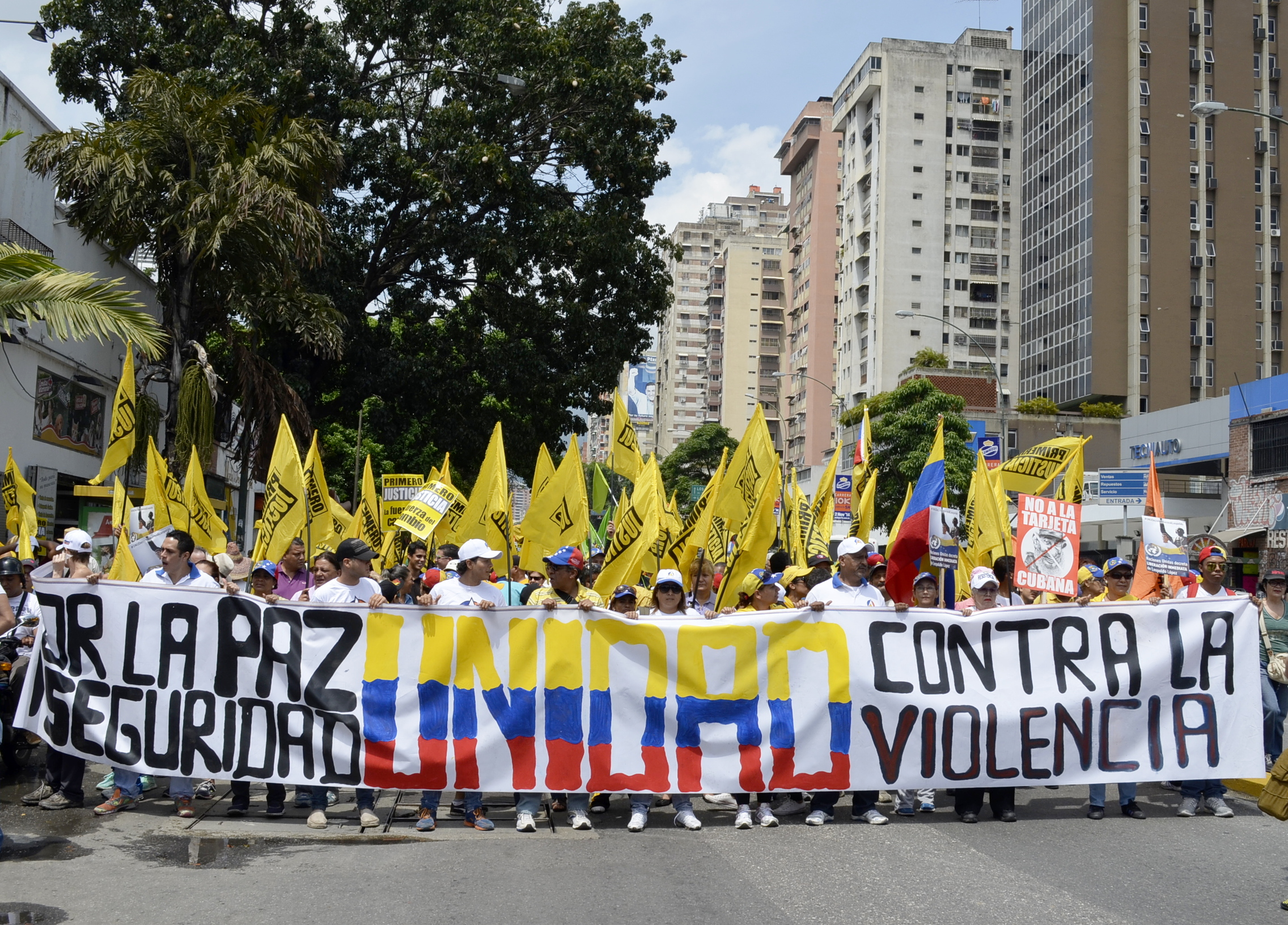
Individuals gathered holding a banner for the "Walk For Peace" march.

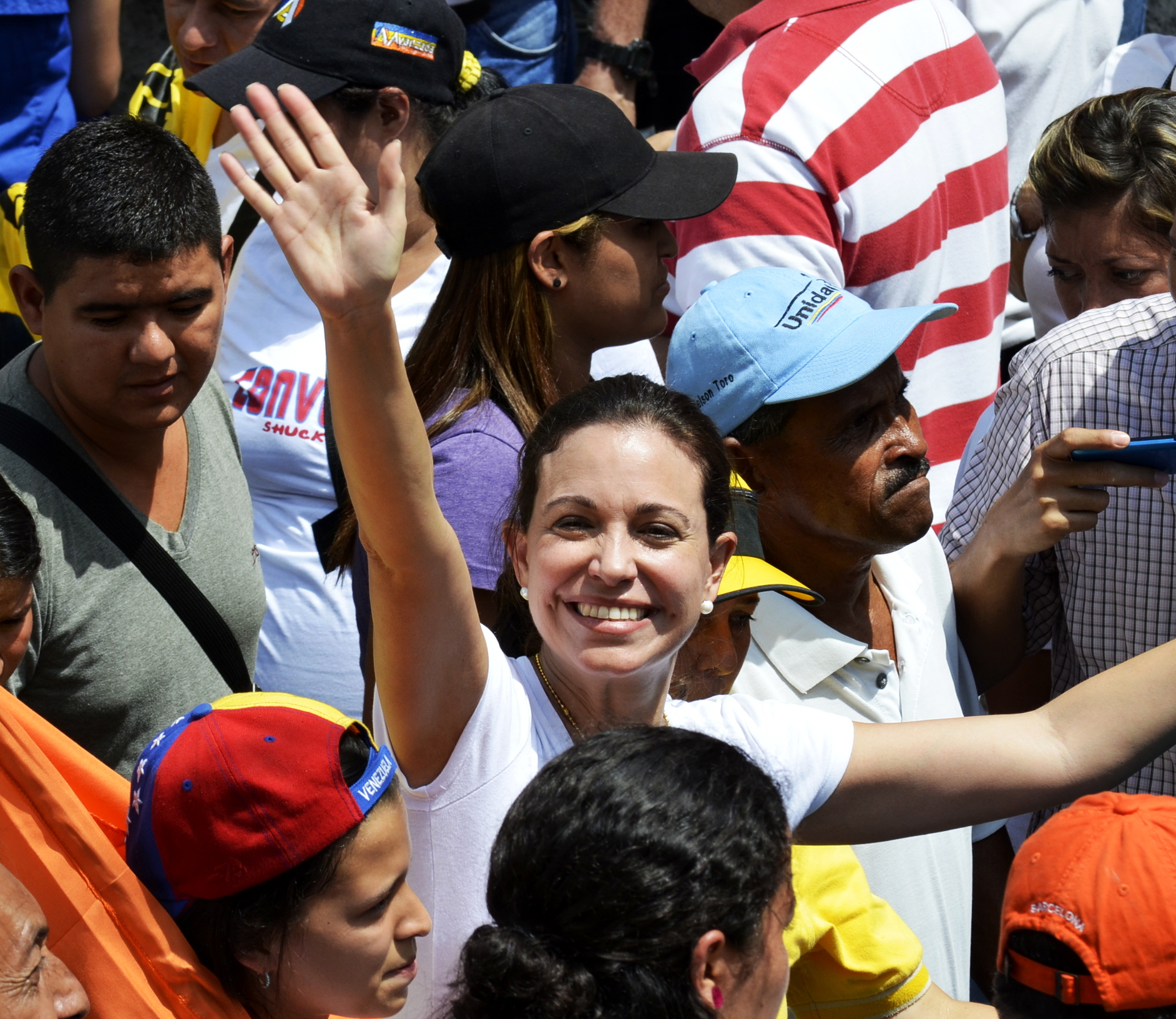
Maria Corina Machado attending the "Walk For Peace" march.

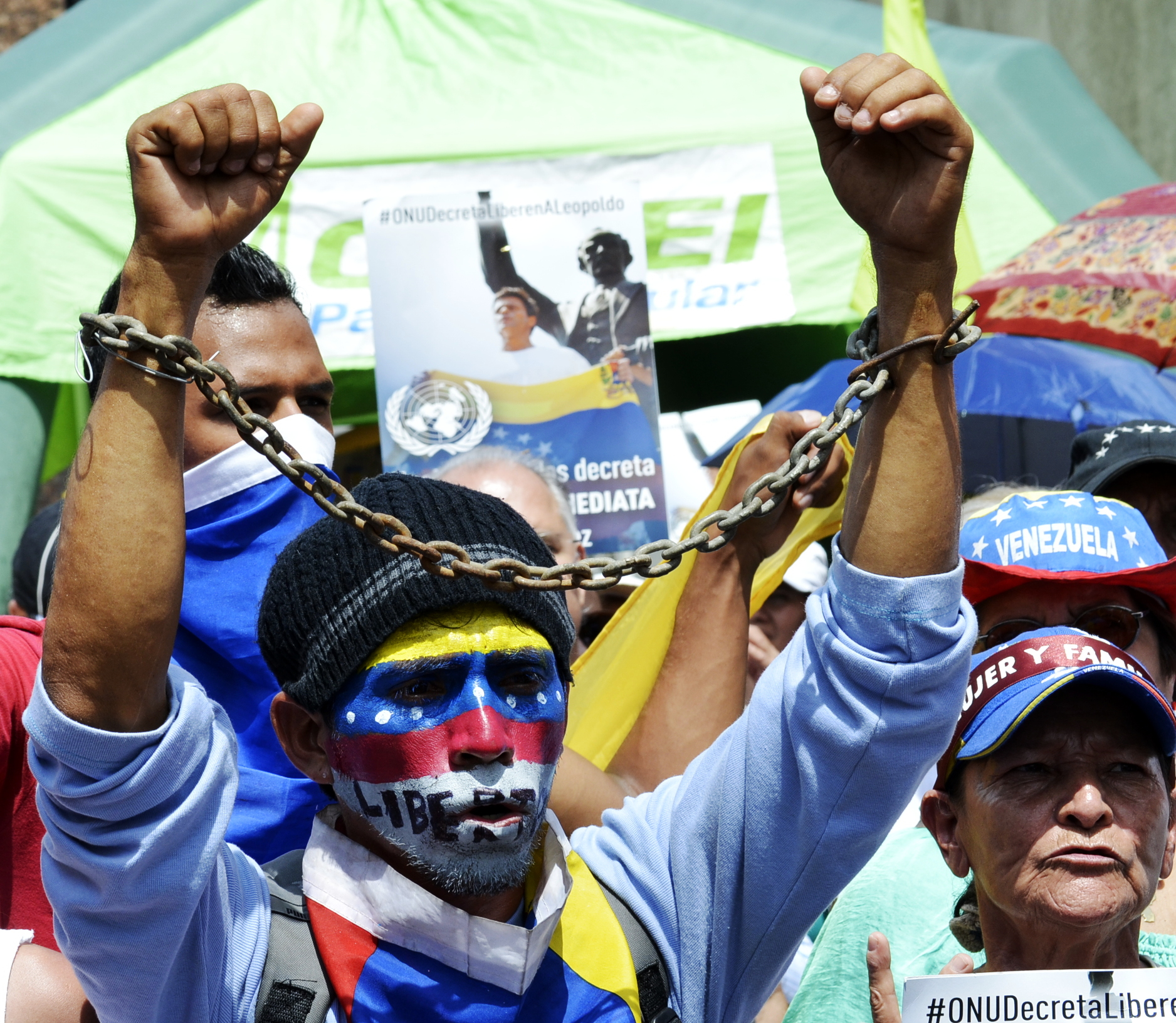
An individual demonstrating, wearing chains.

- 1 October – Maria Corina Machado is awarded the 2014 Charles T. Manatt Democracy Award by the International Foundation for Electoral Systems following her actions calling on citizens to demonstrate and being a target for her work, with Vice Chairman William J. Hybl stating that "Machado's unwavering commitment to giving people a voice in the way they are governed speaks to IFES' core mission of advancing democratic rights and empowering those who have been marginalized from the political process". Machado's son traveled to Washington, D.C. to receive the award for his mother due to travel restrictions placed on Maria Corina Machado by the Venezuelan government. Construction workers in Tachira marched for higher wages. Pro-government deputy, Robert Serra, and his companion María Herrera were found stabbed in their home.
- 2 October – Government officials lamented Serra's murder and started searching the ones that committed the crime. Some of them pointed blame towards the opposition movement. The OAS condoned the act.
- 3 October – President Maduro blamed former Colombian President, Alvaro Uribe, of being the mastermind behind Serra's murder. Uribe responded by calling President Maduro a coward.
- 4 October – Members of Popular Will went to the streets to gather signatures demanding the gathering of a National Constituent Assembly.
- 5 October -During the 2014 Caracas Rock 10K, citizens were seen holding banners demanding the release of Leopoldo López while also discussing other issues.
- 6 October – Clashes occurred at a protest against the Venezuelan government between University of Tachira students and the National Police.
- 7 October – Protests occurred in Mérida following issues with the allocation of funds for University of Los Andes.
- 8 October – The United Nations Working Group on Arbitrary Detention ruled that López was detained arbitrarily and that the Venezuelan government "violated several of their civil, political and constitutional rights" while demanding his immediate release. Students near the Territorial Polytechnic University of Alonso Gamero protested in which resulted in clashes with police. Motorcycle taxi drivers protested in Puerto Cabello against insecurity in the area.
- 9 October – Workers in Maracay protested blocking Bolivar Avenue after not having electricity for 20 days.
- 11 October – The Venezuelan government condemned the statements by the United Nations demanding them to not interfere in Venezuelan affairs.
- 12 October – Three Sidor protesters who were arrested are transferred to the SEBIN headquarters.
- 13 October – Agroindustrial engineering student Carlos Alberto Villamizar Guerrero was reported to be in critical condition after allegedly being struck by a National Police motorcycle during the 6 October protests at the University of Tachira.
- 14 October – The hospital where Carlos Alberto Villamizar Guerrero was being treated at stated that he was not in critical condition.
- 15 October – At the University of Rafael Belloso Chacín in Maracaibo, a demonstration occurred where in one location blocked a street which resulted in the National Guard responding with tear gas and rubber bullets possibly injuring several individuals. Merchants in Maracay protested outside of the CORPOELEC after not having electricity for over 26 days.
- 16 October – Photos of Leopoldo López and Daniel Ceballos are released showing them reaching out of their jail cell windows holding papers showing the approval of the United Nations resolution demanding their release.
- 17 October – In the Maracay neighborhood of Guasimal, residents protested due to the lack of public services. Students and professors of dentistry protested at the Central University of Venezuela due to the lack of supplies saying that out of 200 items, only 10 are found on the market in the area.
- 18 October – A march title "Walk For Peace" was held by the Venezuelan opposition at the Caracas slum area of Petare where the attendees denounced shortages of medicine and food, labor terrorism, political persecution and insecurity.
- 20 October – Citizens of Los Valles del Tuy protested blocking a street while demanding housing.
- 22 October – In Barinas, merchants closed shops due to disagreements with the mayor of the city.
- 23 October – One day after leading a protest on campus, Yeison Carrillo, president of the Student Federation of the National University of Experimental Romulo Gallegos, was shot in the forehead and killed.
- 28 October – Leopoldo Lopez stated that he would not attend trial until the Venezuelan government made a decision on the Working Group on Arbitrary Detention of the UN's decision, which demanded Lopez's release.

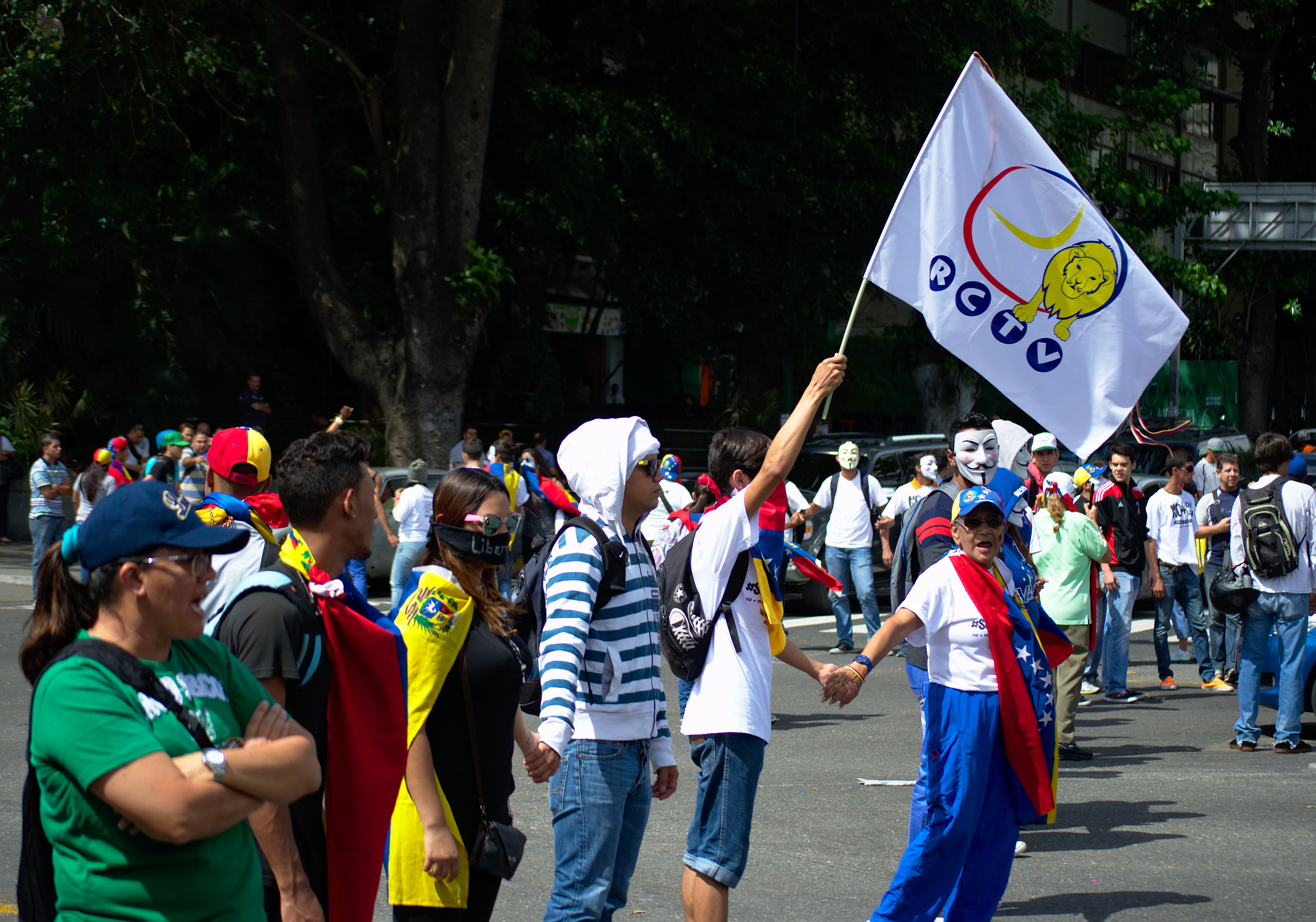
Protesters gathered at Altamira Square on 23 November.

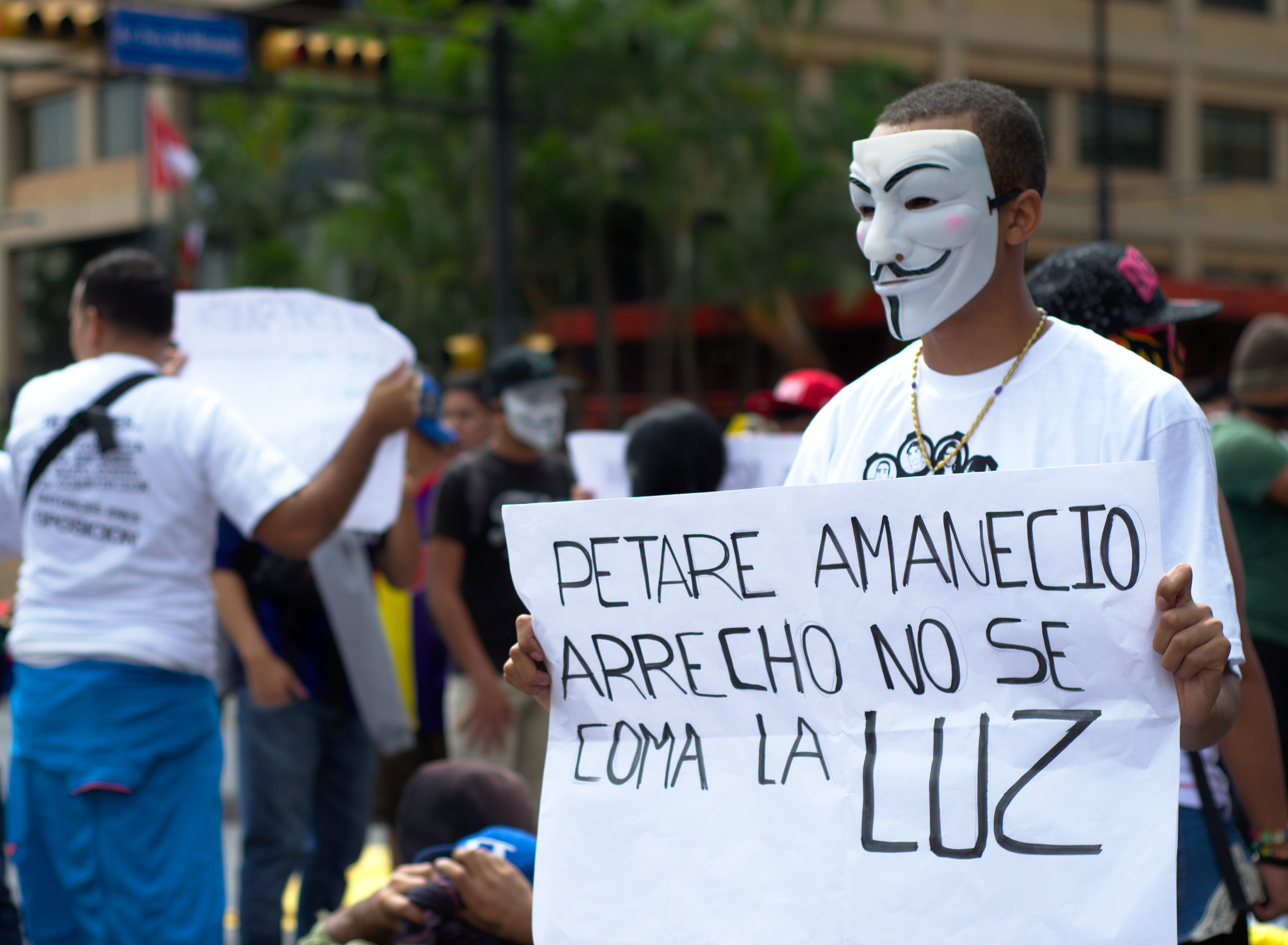
A protester at a 23 November protests holding a sign saying "Petare dawned furious, they do not have light".

- 2 November – Hidrobolívar workers begin protesting after collective agreement issues.
- 3 November – Students of the University of Oriente at San Felix protested days after they, along with university personnel, were robbed violently.
- 6 November – Teachers and citizens protested near Miraflores who demanded a raise from President Maduro and the Venezuelan government. Hidrobolívar workers continue protesting, still demanding negotiations for their collective agreement. Students at the Technical School of Carafe in the Libertador municipality protested against the lack of resources supplied to the school by the Venezuelan government for 6 years.
- 7 November – Administrative workers of the Ministry of Popular Power for Education protested over collective agreement issues. Workers of Friosa ceased work after they received delayed payments while also denouncing problems that were created since it was nationalized.
- 10 November – In San Diego, residents began protesting after two houses were robbed and a person died suspiciously in the area. A group of 46 families, mainly supporters of the Venezuelan government, created an organization called the "Committee of Victims of the Guarimbas and Continuous Blow" to share experiences of barricades and protest methods that have affected their lives.
- 11 November – Citizens of San Diego blocked roads protested for a second consecutive day against insecurity in the area.
- 13 November – Workers of PDVSA blocked roads in La Piña for several hours protesting against the debts of PDVSA and the decay of PDVSA facilities.
- 14 November – In northern Anzoategui, three separate protest events denouncing poor roads and poor sewers while also demanding fumigation and better electric services caused traffic backups after closing a national road in the area. The Committee of Victims of the Guarimbas and First Vice President of the National Assembly Dario Vivas announced plans to "rebut" ideas that Leopoldo Lopez and other prisoners were the victims during the protests.
- 17 November – Residents in Valencia protested, blocking streets following large power outages Venezuela faced.
- 18 November – In Naguanagua, residents protested against state electric company CORPOELEC after not having electricity for several days. Supporters of Leopoldo Lopez gathered outside of a courthouse, with some chaining themselves while demanding his release.
- 19 November – In El Callao, millers and miners protested over contracts and demanded the government to change the legality of certain mining procedures.
- 20 November – Workers of Hidrobolívar continued to protest over collective agreements after three weeks, blocking commercial offices where revenues are collected. Residents of Villas del Río blocked the entrance to an industrial complex protesting over not having adequate sewage utilities and for the shortages of electricity in the area.
- 22 November – A young group of protesters gathered outside of the Public Ministry of the State of Nueva Esparta demanding the release of student protesters arrested during the protests.
- 24 November – Hidrobolívar protested for the 22nd consecutive day with calls of dialogue with the Bolivar state governor. North Barquisimeto underwent protests after enraged resident experienced the failing of sewers in the area and proceeded to block roads and burn tires in the street.
- 25 November – After issues of the sales of tires occurred due to shortages in El Tigre, buyers protested near the store blocking a street for about 30 minutes resulting with a response from the National Guard.
- 26 November – Large groups of workers of the state-owned Central Azucarera Venezuela sugar plant protested for several hours after the repeated dismissal of workers.
- 27 November – A group of families protested outside of the National Housing Institute (Inavi) headquarters in Puerto Ordaz over issues with their housing with the Great Housing Mission Venezuela.

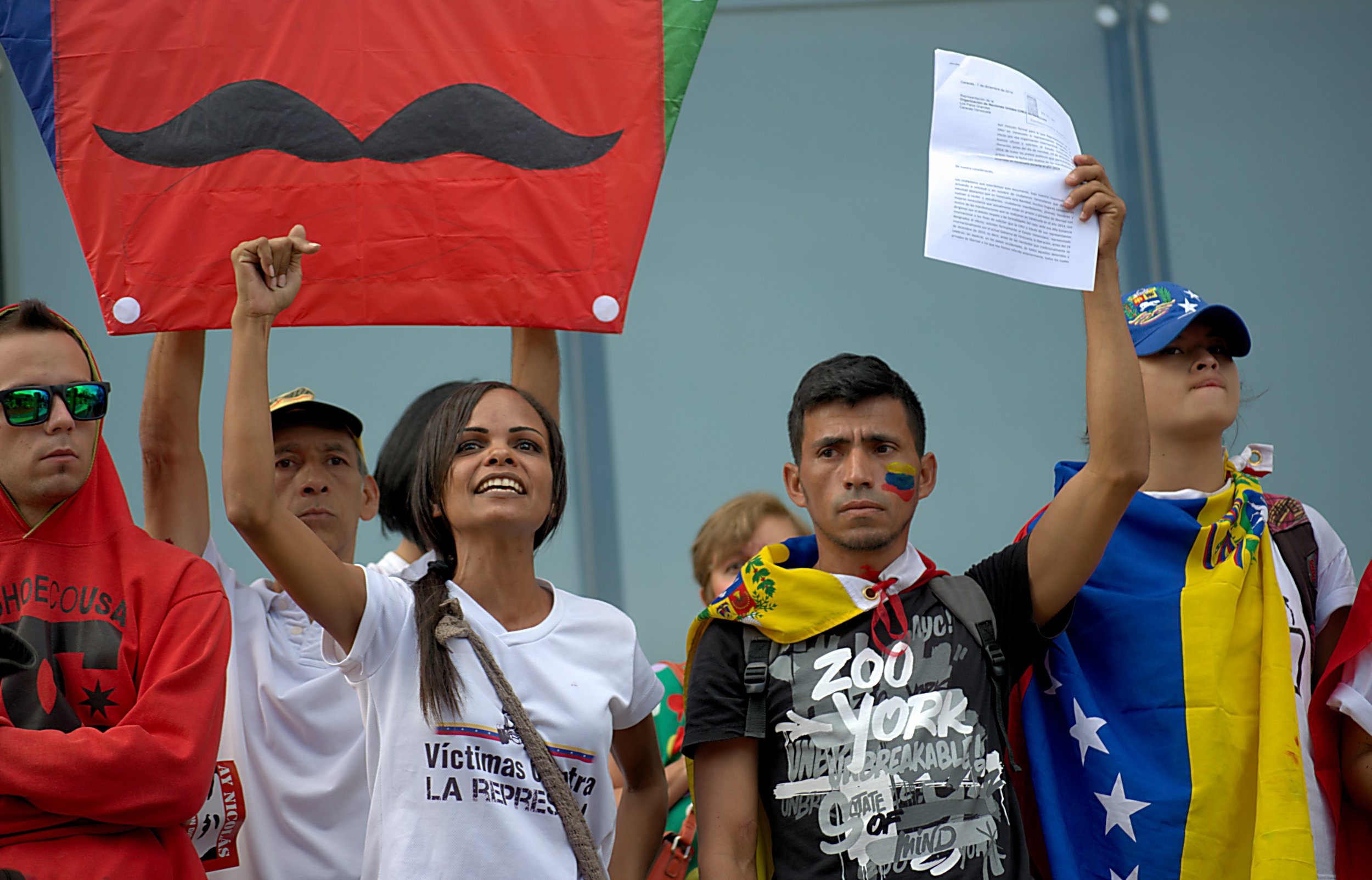
Marvinia Jiménez and others protesting during a march from Altamira Square to the UNDP headquarters.

- 1 December – Retired employees of CORPOELEC protested after inadequate pay and demanded to meet with Jesse Chacón, minister of the electricity sector.
- 2 December – Residents of Boca Grita commandeered two fuel trucks, blocked roads between Tachira and Zulia and threatened to burn the trucks if the governor did not make an appearance. A group of 20 member of The Committee of Victims of the Guarimbas demonstrated outside of the Spanish embassy in Venezuela, demanding Spanish prime minister, Mariano Rajoy, to "not encourage impunity" after he demanded the release of Leopoldo Lopez on 27 October.
- 9 December – The Committee of Victims of the Guarimbas denounced the introduction of possible US sanctions saying it promoted impunity to opposition leaders that they believed were responsible for violence and criticized the decisions by the UN Committee against Torture and the Group on Arbitrary Detention, and the UN High Commissioner for Human Rights.
- 12 December – Popular Will youth leader Gaby Arellano was delivered a letter by SEBIN to be imputed by the Public Ministry. The Committee of Victims of the Guarimbas presented a letter to the mission EU in Caracas to tell their stories of the protests while denouncing the Spanish prime minister.
- 15 December – Protests occurred at Colonia Tovar in Aragua state over insecurity in the area. Students at UNET Táchira protested over the budget.
- 16 December – Students from the Catholic University of Táchira protested in support of students who had been arrested since February.
- 17 December – Former Mayor of Carabobo, Enzo Scarano, who was arrested by Venezuelan authorities was reported to be tried in military court.
- 18 December – Students chained themselves together in Plaza Altamira demanding the release of imprisoned protesters by the Venezuelan government.
- 19 December -The chief diplomat of the European Union, Federica Mogherini, said that she was "seriously concerned" about "continuous arbitrary arrests", with the EU resolution noting that Leopoldo Lopez "suffered physical and psychological torture" and also denounced the situations of opposition mayors Daniel Ceballos and Vicencio Scarano.
- 21 December – Students chained in Plaza Altamira sent letters to imprisoned protesters and called for a cacerolazo at night.
- 23 December – In the cities of Lara and Trujillo, students performed similar protests as those in Plaza Altamira and chained themselves together saying they would remain there until the Venezuelan government released student protesters.

== See also ==
- Timeline of the 2015 Venezuelan protests
- Timeline of the 2016 Venezuelan protests
- Timeline of the 2017 Venezuelan protests
- Timeline of the 2018 Venezuelan protests
- Timeline of the 2019 Venezuelan protests
