= Susana Barreiros =

Venezuelan judge

- Born: Susana Virginia Barreiros Rodríguez; 11 July 1981 (age 45)
- Education: Universidad Santa María

Susana Virginia Barreiros Rodríguez (born 11 July 1981) is a Venezuelan judge, most notable for leading the case and sentencing against the opposition leader Leopoldo López. She was provisionally designated as Public Defender of Venezuela in 2015, until her resignation, which saw the role being given to Carmen Marisela Castro on 8 January 2019.

== Career ==
On 1 March 2003, she entered the roster of the Judicial Branch. On 12 August 2010, the Judicial Commission designated Barreiros as the substitute for Judge María Lourdes Afiuni. Afiuni was imprisoned after sentencing in favor towards indicted businessman Eligio Cedeño. This led to Barreiros gaining control of the First District Court of the Criminal Judicial Circuit of the Metropolitan Area of Caracas. In 2012, the Supreme Tribunal of Justice named her, along with Alí Fabricio Paredes, as anti-terrorist judges. However, her partner was dismissed after being accused of favoring drug trafficker Walid Makled during his sentencing. On 6 May 2015, she graduated as magister in criminal law from the Universidad Santa María.

On 10 July 2015, she was included as an alternate judge to cover vacant positions in the Court of Appeals of the Criminal Judicial Circuit of the Judicial Circumscription of the Metropolitan Area of Caracas due to rest permissions, vacations, abstentions and recusals of other judges.

Barreiros has been in charge of many cases linked with banking institutions: in January 2014 she sentenced José Nicolás Tovar Jiménez, Ramón Heraldo Paredes and Laejandro Néstor Tineo Salas after discovering falsified notes of the former Agricultural Development Bank (BANDAGRO). She also began investigatory proceedings against Ricardo Fernández Berruecos and Arné Chacón, brother of the former minister Jesse Chacón, both responsible for the small bank crisis 2009. She granted Chacón freedom.

== Sanctions ==
Canada sanctioned 40 Venezuelan officials, including Barreiros, in September 2017. The sanctions were for behaviors that undermined democracy after at least 125 people will killed in the 2017 Venezuelan protests and "in response to the government of Venezuela's deepening descent into dictatorship"; Chrystia Freeland, Foreign Minister said, "Canada will not stand by silently as the government of Venezuela robs its people of their fundamental democratic rights". The Canadian regulations of the Special Economic Measures Act prohibited any "person in Canada and any Canadian outside Canada from: dealing in property, wherever situated, that is owned, held or controlled by listed persons or a person acting on behalf of a listed person; entering into or facilitating any transaction related to a dealing prohibited by these Regulations; providing any financial or related services in respect of a dealing prohibited by these Regulations; making available any goods, wherever situated, to a listed person or a person acting on behalf of a listed person; and providing any financial or other related services to or for the benefit of a listed person."
