= Golpe Azul =

Alleged coup conspiration in Venezuela

Golpe Azul (English: Blue Strike), also known as Operation Jericho, was an accusation by the Venezuelan government that resulted in the arrest of several people, including the metropolitan mayor of Caracas Antonio Ledezma. The accusation consisted in an alleged coup d'état plan against the presidency of Nicolás Maduro, which reportedly would take place on 12 February 2015 and would have several targets in Caracas. The name of the plan refers to the blue uniform of the Venezuelan Air Force in which several suspects were officers.

Venezuelan NGO Foro Penal declared that the accused suspects were political prisoners and that they were convicted without evidence, and its director Alfredo Romero described the sentence as arbitrary.

Based on the accusations, Antonio Ledezma was arrested in his office on 19 February by SEBIN officers. According to opposition reports, Golpe Azul was the twelfth coup d'état attempt that President Maduro alleged.

== Plot and arrests ==
On 12 February 2015, President Nicolás Maduro announced an alleged coup. Libertador Municipality Mayor Jorge Rodríguez, during a special broadcast of Con El Mazo Dando on state-run Venezolana de Televisión (VTV), denounced the participants of an alleged attempt planned by aviation general Oswaldo Hernández, who was convicted in May 2014 along with nine other military personnel for the crimes of rebellion and against military decorum.

National Assembly president Diosdado Cabello announced the arrests of eight people in Aragua by officials of the Bolivarian National Intelligence Service (SEBIN) and the seizure of various equipment, including a computer with information on the tactical objectives of the coup group. He also showed maps allegedly located on the computer equipment of the protagonists of Golpe Azul, where buildings appeared in Caracas that were marked as tactical objectives such as the Miraflores Palace, the Public Ministry of Venezuela, the Caracas mayor's office, the Ministry of Defense headquarters, the Ministry of Interior, Justice and Peace building, the Supreme Tribunal of Justice (TSJ), the National Electoral Council (CNE), the Directorate General of Military Counterintelligence (DGCIM) and offices of Telesur.

During the program, Mayor Jorge Rodríguez accused National Assembly deputy and opposition politician Julio Borges of choosing the places indicated as tactical objectives. Cabello also revealed the alleged possession of AR-15 rifles, grenades, military and security uniforms, as well as an eight-minute video with a statement from the protagonists. According to Cabello, the bombing would be carried out with a Tucano artillery plane after publishing a statement in the national press requesting the government, among other things, the dissolution of public powers, the call for elections and the affiliation to organizations such as the International Monetary Fund (IMF) and later the military would issue a uniformed message where they would make a called the population to calm.

== Arrest of Antonio Ledezma ==
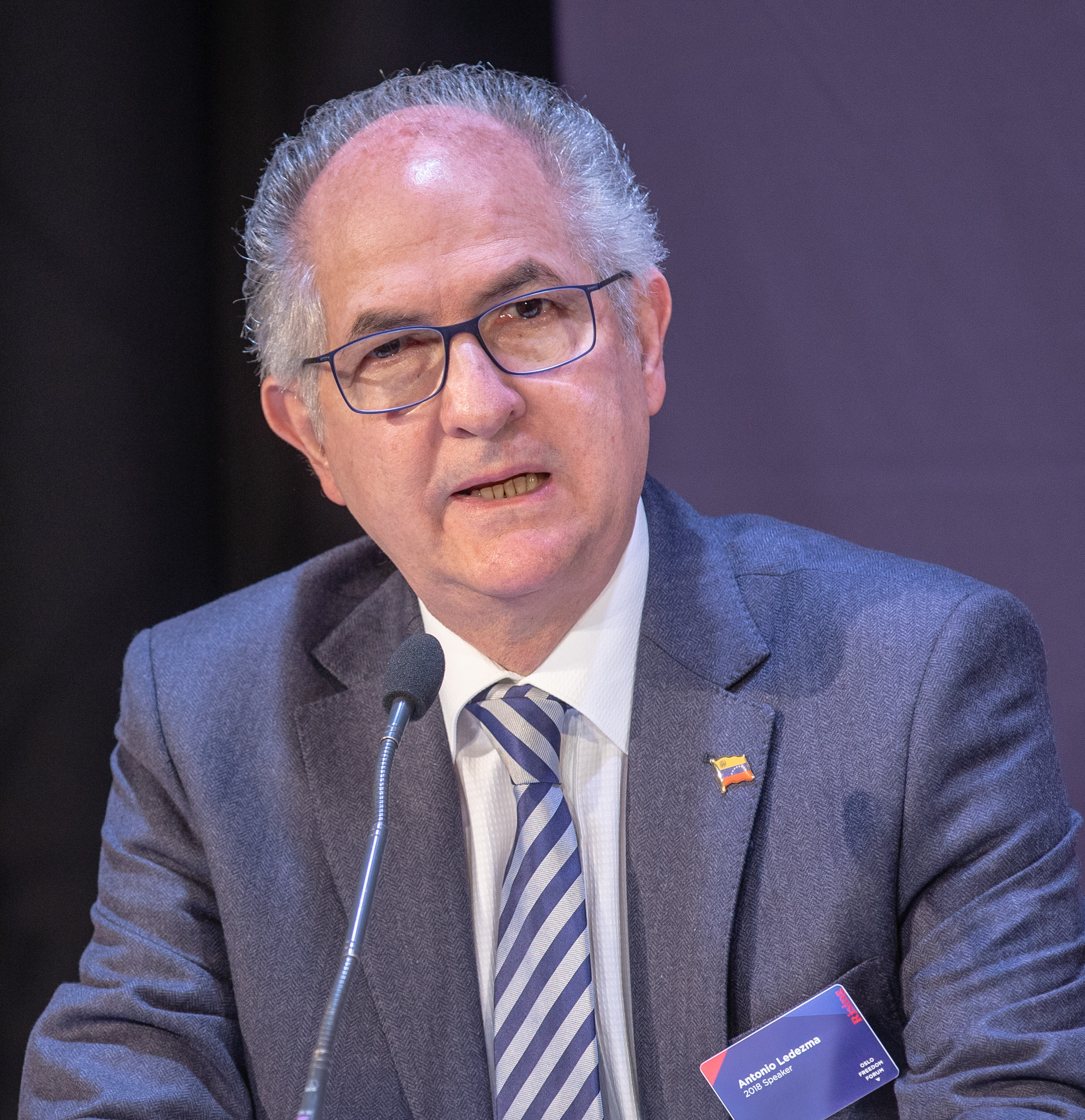
Antonio Ledezma, metropolitan mayor of Caracas, arrested on 19 February 2015.

On 19 February 2015, Antonio Ledezma was detained by the Bolivarian Intelligence Service at his office in the EXA Tower in Caracas. In the operation, the security forces made warning shots to the air to disperse a crowd that was forming. He was then transported to SEBIN's headquarters in Plaza Venezuela. His lawyer declared that the charges for his detention were unknown.

The New York Times stated that Ledezma was arrested by the Venezuelan Government after accusations made by President Nicolás Maduro about an "American plot to overthrow the government" that he presented a week before Ledezma's arrest. Ledezma mocked the accusations stating that the Venezuelan government was destabilizing itself through corruption. The United States denied the accusations by President Maduro and stated that "Venezuela’s problems cannot be solved by criminalizing dissent".

=== Response to arrest ===
Following the news of the arrest of Ledezma, his supporters quickly created protests and called the arrest a "kidnapping" and that the coup conspiracy was created for political purposes. Hours after the news broke, hundreds of Ledezma supporters gathered in a Caracas plaza to denounce his arrest. Protesters also gathered outside of the SEBIN headquarters.

Human rights groups quickly condemned Ledezma's arrest and the similarity of the case to Leopoldo López's arrest was noted by The New York Times. Amnesty International condemned Ledezma's arrest calling it politically motivated, noting the similar cases of arrests made by the Venezuelan Government in what Amnesty International described as "silencing dissenting voices". Human Rights Watch demanded his release with Human Rights Watch's Americas division director, Jose Miguel Vivanco, stating that without evidence, Ledezma "faces another case of arbitrary detention of opponents in a country where there is no judicial independence".

=== Imprisonment ===
In March 2015, the court ordered Ledezma to be taken at the Ramo Verde military jail, where he would be imprisoned before standing trial. On the same month, former socialist Prime Minister of Spain, Felipe González, agreed to take over the defense of Ledezma in his trial after Ledezma's family requested his assistance. Two months later, he was sent back home for health reasons, where he had been placed under house arrest and unable to express himself publicly.

On 1 August 2017, Ledezma (along with Leopoldo López) were re-arrested by SEBIN, which did not file any legal arrest warrant. According to the pro-Maduro Venezuelan Supreme Tribunal of Justice, it said that it had received intelligence reports alleging the two were trying to flee Venezuela. The court also said that it had revoked Mr Ledezma's and Mr López's house arrest because they had made political statements relating to the 2017 Venezuelan Constituent Assembly election. Lopez and Ledezma were sent to Ramo Verde prison and Ledezma was released back to house arrest on 4 August.

=== Escape from house arrest ===
On 17 November 2017, Ledezma slipped past guards and fled to Colombia. He departed the same day from El Dorado International Airport in Bogotá to Adolfo Suárez Madrid–Barajas Airport in Madrid, Spain. Upon landing he declared he would continue his fight of opposition to the Venezuelan Government and was reunited with his family.

== Trial ==
The eight defendants, three civilians (Pedro Maury, Jesus Salazar and Luis Colmenares) and five military officers of the Venezuelan Air Force (Ricardo José Antich, Luis Lugo, Peter Moreno, Carlos Esqueda, Henry Salazar and Laided Salazar) were sentenced in the second military court of Maracay on 12 January 2017. Captains Ronald Ramírez and Jackson García were witnesses at the trial.

They were witnesses promoted by the Prosecutor. They were taken as experts in these aircraft to tell at the trial if these soldiers were able to fly some Sukhoi that were in Lara, they alone without help, to give a coup d'etat. And the answer of these two witnesses, very professional, was no, that to artillery a plane for a rebellion 14 people were needed and they were eight. They also accused the military that they were going to bomb Caracas and some buildings aboard those Tucano planes and they also asked both of them. They explained that it was impossible to move those bombs in a way other than by land, and that those bombs were not in Lara but in Guárico, Zulia and in the east. In addition, the trial showed that the planes could not be used because they had the landing gear damaged.

— Carlos Javier Salazar, lawyer of Laided Salazar, captain sentenced to eight years and seven months for crimes of instigation to rebellion and against military decorum.

On 26 December 2018, the sentence was ratified by the TSJ.
