= Leo López =

Leo López may refer to:

- Leo López (footballer) (born 1970), Spanish football manager and former footballer
- Leopoldo López (born 1971), Venezuelan opposition leader

== See also ==
- Leonardo López (disambiguation)
- Leopoldo López (disambiguation)
- Leon Lopez (born 1979), English actor
