= Leopoldo López (disambiguation) =

Leopoldo López (born 1971) is a Venezuelan opposition leader

Leopoldo López may also refer to:

- Leopoldo López Escobar (1940–2003), Chilean geochemist
- Leopoldo López Gil (born 1944), Venezuelan-Spanish politician, father of the opposition leader

== See also ==
- Leo López (disambiguation)
