= Iván Simonovis =

Venezuelan police chief

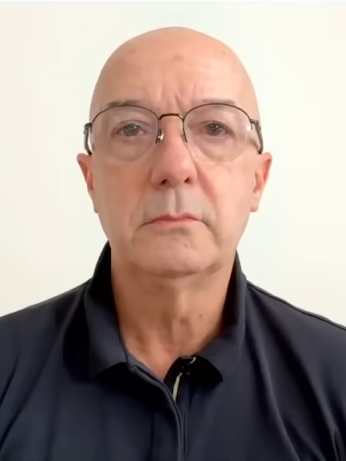
- Simonovis in 2025

Special Security and Intelligence Commissioner of Venezuela
- In office 10 July 2019 – 18 May 2021
- Appointed by: Carlos Vecchio
- President: Juan Guaidó

Secretary of Citizen Security of the Capital District
- In office September 2000 – April 2002
- Appointed by: Alfredo Peña

Personal details
- Born: 3 March 1960 (age 66) Caracas, Venezuela
- Occupation: Criminal science expert, police officer

Iván Antonio Simonovis Aranguren (born 3 March 1960 in Caracas) is a Venezuelan criminal science expert and security consultant, who served as security chief during the Llaguno Overpass events of April 2002 in Caracas.

== Biography ==
Coming from a working-class family he started his career as a detective in 1981. He created the first Venezuelan police tactical team (BAE – Spanish: Brigada de Acciones Especiales) in collaboration with other international law enforcement units like the German GSG 9 and various American Police Forces. Simonovis successfully led the rescue operation during the 1998 Cúa hostage crisis to save a woman held hostage by an armed robber. Simonovis later also served as security chief of the Metropolitan District of Caracas. Simonovis invited New York City Police Department chief William Bratton to Caracas to help with the criminality.

== Arrest ==
He was arrested in November 2004 and accused by the Hugo Chávez government of the violence that took place in Caracas during April 2002, under the order of pro-Chávez judge Maikel Moreno. In 2009, he was found guilty and sentenced to 30 years in the notorious Ramo Verde Prison in the outskirts of Caracas. Due to the severe conditions in which he was held, his health deteriorated. He suffers from advanced osteoporosis because of sun deprivation for many years. Due to his deteriorating health, he requested humanitarian pardon on several occasions, all denied by the Venezuelan government. Simonovis was considered a political prisoner by human rights advocates.

On 16 April 2012, former Supreme Tribunal of Justice judge Eladio Aponte Aponte wrote an open letter from San José, Costa Rica, in which he confessed having received orders and being pressured by president Hugo Chávez to convict Simonovis without rights, as well as Caracas Metropolitan Police officers Henry Vivas and Lázaro Forero, applying the maximum sentence for their participation during the Llaguno Overpass events. In September 2014, Simonovis was granted house arrest to receive medical treatment.

=== Release ===
During the 2019 Venezuelan presidential crisis, Simonovis escaped house arrest in May. Juan Guaidó, recognized by the National Assembly as the acting president of Venezuela, said that security forces loyal to him released Simonovis. Guaidó claims that the pardon was requested during the events of 30 April and that Simonovis was freed as part of "Operation Freedom" (Spanish: Operación Libertad). The Maduro administration did not comment on Simonovis' whereabouts. In an interview for El Pitazo, lawyer Joel García stated that Simonovis had left the country. According to his wife, Simonovis was threatened with being brought back to prison before he escaped. Simonovis wore an ankle monitor and was surveyed by Bolivarian Intelligence Service (SEBIN) forces.

In June 2019, Simonovis published on Twitter a photo of himself next to the Equestrian of Simón Bolívar in Washington, D.C., United States. During an interview for Associated Press, Simonovis explained how during his escape he had to jump a 25 meters wall, break his ankle monitor, ride a boat whose motor later broke down and piloted a plane to get to United States. Leopoldo López, opposition leader that also was released on 30 April, contacted US and other foreign government officials to request help, and grant passage and entry to Simonovis. His wife published messages in Germany to divert the authorities.

As he arrived in Washington, Simonovis said that he would work with U.S. authorities to investigate cases of corruption, drug trafficking and alleged links to terrorist groups by Venezuelan officials. As of end June, Maduro administration had not released any statement on Simonovis escape.

== See also ==
- Detention of Maria Lourdes Afiuni
- Leopoldo López
- Political prisoners in Venezuela
