= Leonardo López =

Leonardo López may refer to:

- Leonardo Daniel (born 1954), born Leonardo Daniel López de Rodas García, Mexican actor and director
- Leonardo López Luján (born 1964), Mexican archaeologist
- Leo López (footballer) (born 1970), born Leonardo López Jiménez, Spanish football manager and former footballer
- MkLeo (born 2001), born Leonardo López Pérez, Mexican professional esports player

== See also ==
- Leo López (disambiguation)
- Leobardo López Aretche (1942-1970), Mexican film director
- Leobardo López (born 1983), Mexican footballer
- Leonardo Lopes (born 1998), Portuguese footballer
