= 1998 Cúa hostage crisis =

1998 hostage crisis in Cúa, Venezuela

- Nancy López held hostage by Héctor Duarte, just seconds before the latter's death
- Location: Cúa, Venezuela
- Date: April 5, 1998 (28 years, 6 months ago) (VET UTC-4)
- Target: Bakery
- Attack type: Hostage situation, shooting, attempted robbery
- Weapon: Revolver
- Deaths: 1 (perpetrator)
- Injuries: 3
- Perpetrator: Héctor Duarte

The 1998 Cúa hostage crisis occurred on April 5, 1998, in Cúa, Venezuela, when 18-year-old Héctor Duarte attempted to rob a bakery with a revolver. After his robbery went wrong, he took a woman hostage and threatened to kill her. He then engaged police in a stand-off that lasted for seven hours. The stand-off eventually ended when a police marksman shot Duarte in the head, killing him and saving the hostage. His graphic death was caught on camera.

== Crisis ==
The incident occurred on April 5, 1998, when 18-year-old Héctor Duarte Bahamonte attempted to rob a bakery with a revolver in Cúa, approximately 50 km south of Caracas, the capital city of Venezuela. Police foiled Duarte's efforts to rob the bakery and shot him in the arm, which resulted in Duarte taking hostages. He went into a nearby residential block and took 44-year-old Nancy López and her family hostage. Duarte shot two of his hostages, one of whom was a 9-year-old boy, and left them both bleeding on the ninth floor. He then emerged outside the building with López. He placed his revolver to her temple and threatened to kill her unless he received a vehicle that he could use for his escape. Duarte planned on fleeing to Caracas. Police cordoned off the neighborhood and began attempts to reason with Duarte. Police chief Ivan Simonovis took charge of the rescue operation to save López.

Seven hours passed, with police making desperate attempts to plead with Duarte and attempting to convince him to surrender peacefully. During the stand-off, Duarte spoke to his mother on a police cell phone. Despite the threat on her life, López reportedly remained fairly calm throughout the ordeal. Duarte repeatedly rejected police efforts to resolve the situation peacefully. Duarte reportedly said "Kill me and I will kill the woman. Send me to the cemetery once and for all. Bring two coffins". A police psychologist negotiated with Duarte from a nearby van, with police sharpshooters hiding behind the vehicle. Eventually, a police marksman fired a single shot with a sniper rifle at Duarte's face and shot him through the left eye. Duarte was killed instantly. López then broke free with only minor injuries. She was in shock but unharmed.

== Aftermath ==
Duarte was taken to an ambulance but was dead on scene. López escaped with only minor injuries and the other two hostages who had been shot both survived after being taken to hospital. All the victims were reported as being safe and were recovering. Police were certain there had been no other choice but to shoot Duarte to end the hostage crisis. López was interviewed by reporters the following day about the ordeal. She said she had been "born again" by the experience and had asked God to forgive Duarte. She said "I was born again yesterday, it was not my time but I was born yesterday again. I ask God to receive him (Duarte) up there and forgive him because this after all are things we do without knowing why we do them and let him rest in peace and forgive him."

== In popular culture ==
Footage of Duarte's death was caught on camera by news crews filming the scene. This footage has been featured both on television and in numerous documentaries about crime. It was featured in the shockumentary film, Banned! In America, as well as the 1998 shockumentary film, Banned from Television. Both films reported the location of the crisis incorrectly. Banned! In America reported the crisis as having occurred in Caracas, Venezuela and Banned from Television reported it as having occurred in Bogotá, Colombia.

In June 2017, the video of Duarte's shooting went viral in India, as it was mistakenly reported as a police sharp shooter taking out an ISIS terrorist in Spain. Posts on social media and WhatsApp claimed the video was of a terrorist killed in Spain. Websites such as BoomLive and The Quint published articles confirming the story was fake and had occurred in 1998.
