= Ralenis Tovar =

Ralenis Jolissa Tovar Guillén (born in Caracas) is a Venezuelan judge who in 2014 signed the arrest warrant against opposition leader Leopoldo López. In 2017 Ralenis announced that she was threatened to sign the warrant.

== Career ==
Tovar pursued a career as a judge for seventeen years in Caracas. On February 12, 2014, during the protests in Venezuela, Tovar, Judge of the Sixteenth (16º) Court in control functions, issued an arrest warrant for opposition leader Leopoldo López on charges that included "instigation to commit crimes, public intimidation, arson of a public building, damage to public property, homicide, serious injury, incitement to create disturbances," and "terrorism".

The judge subsequently fled the country. Following the 2017 protests in Venezuela, the Organization of American States organized a series of public hearings on possible crimes against humanity committed in the country. In the third session of the hearings, Tovar intervened virtually from Canada and stated that in 2014 when in doubt, one of the military officials had asked her "Do you kind of want to become a second Judge Lourdes Afiuni?" and that she signed the arrest warrant for Leopoldo because she felt frightened.
