= Gustavo Baquero =

Venezuelan engineer

Gustavo Baquero is a Venezuelan engineer, professor and oil industry executive. S&P said he would be named by Juan Guaidó's administration to be president of PDVSA (Venezuela's state-run petroleum company).

Raised in Caracas in a family of doctors, Baquero did undergraduate studies at Venezuela's Andres Bello Catholic University (UCAB) and graduate studies at Harvard University. He has taught petroleum economics at UCAB and business management of hydrocarbons at IESA in Caracas. He was described by Americas Quarterly as an oil expert who would someday help rebuild Venezuela. Together with Leopoldo López, he wrote Venezuela Energética.

== Publications ==
- Leopoldo López, Gustavo Baquero (2017). VENEZUELA ENERGÉTICA: Propuesta para el bienestar y progreso de los venezolanos (La Hoja del Norte) (in Spanish). Cyngular Asesoría 357, C.A. / Editorial Dahbar. ISBN 978-9804250163.
