= Leopoldo López Gil =

Spanish politician

Leopoldo López Gil MEP
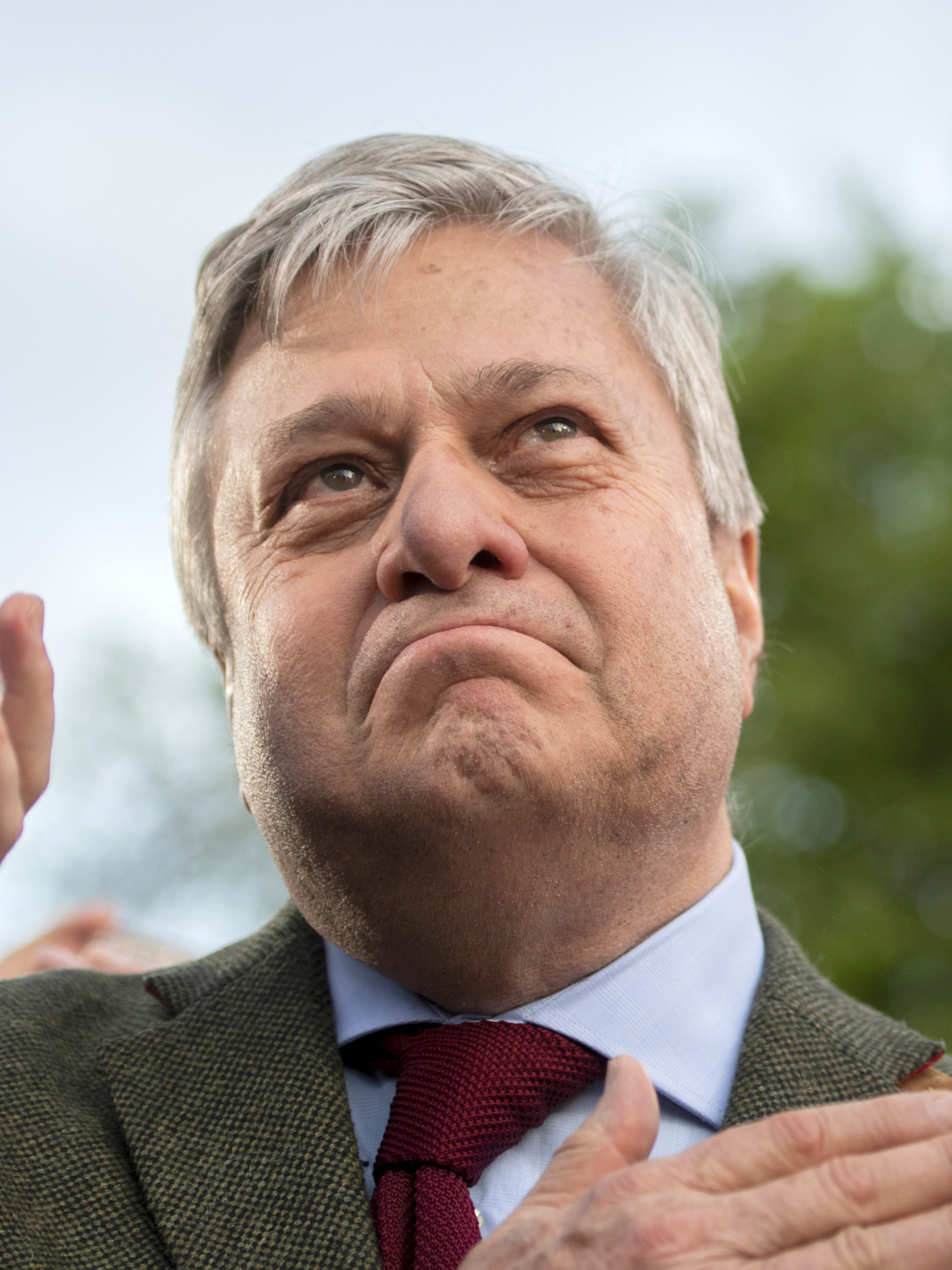

Member of the European Parliament for Spain
- In office 2 July 2019 – 16 July 2024

Personal details
- Born: Leopoldo López Gil; 20 October 1944 (age 81) Caracas, Venezuela
- Citizenship: Venezuela; Spain (since 2015)
- Party: People's Party (2019–present)
- Other political affiliations: Popular Will (2009–present)
- Spouse: Antonieta Mendoza Coburn
- Children: 3, including Leopoldo López
- Education: Columbia University

Leopoldo López Gil (pronounced [le.oˈpoldo ˈlopes ˈxil]; born 20 October 1944) is a Spanish-Venezuelan politician who was elected as a Member of the European Parliament in 2019.

== Political career ==
López Gil is the father of Venezuelan dissident Leopoldo López. He was granted Spanish citizenship by the Government of Mariano Rajoy in December 2015. He ran 12th in the People's Party (PP) list for the 2019 European Parliament election in Spain in replacement of Ángel Garrido, who renounced to be a PP candidate and went to support Citizens.

López Gil has been a Member of the European Parliament since the 2019 European elections. In parliament, he has since been serving on the Subcommittee on Human Rights. In addition to his committee assignments, he is part of the parliament's delegations to the EU-Chile Joint Parliamentary Committee and to the Euro-Latin American Parliamentary Assembly.

== Political positions ==
In a joint letter with 15 other MEPs from various political groups, López Gil urged the High Representative of the Union for Foreign Affairs and Security Policy Josep Borrell in early 2021 to replace the European Union's ambassador to Cuba for allegedly siding with the country's Communist leadership.
