= Ramo Verde Prison =

Maximum security prison in Venezuela

- Interactive map of Ramo Verde Prison
- Location: Los Teques, Miranda, Venezuela; 10°21′43″N 67°03′18″W
- Status: Operational
- Security class: Maximum Security
- Managed by: Government of Venezuela

Ramo Verde Prison (officially called National Center for Military Processed of Ramo Verde) is a military prison in the Los Teques municipality of Miranda, Venezuela. It is a prison known for its strict policies and security measures for prisoners, reserved specifically for military personnel and civilians whose characteristics represent an importance to the Venezuelan state, whether for reasons of safety or policies that may stay in place temporarily or to meet all of their penalties.

== Security ==
Security relies on the Third Division of the Army of Venezuela and the Operational Area Integral Defense (ZODI) of the capital. Gonzalo Himiob of the Venezuelan Penal stated that Ramo Verde "is the most secure prison in the country by a military character".

== Detainees ==
Ramo Verde has been a point of controversy and criticism due to cases of known personalities held there. According to an NGO called Citizen Control for Security, Ramo Verde is a prison "where prisoners are sort of invisible for the Venezuelan Government and totally unaware of any control mechanism laid down in the Law."

Among the people who have been held there include:

- The Commanding General Raúl Isaías Baduel, former army commander and former Defense Minister of Hugo Chavez.
- Carlos Ortega, former president of the Confederation of Workers of Venezuela, who escaped with Darío Farías and Captain Rafael Farias in 2006.
- Captain Otto Gebauer, who participated in the events of 11 April 2002.
- Commissioners Henry Vivas and Lázaro Forero, former senior officials of the former Metropolitan Police of Caracas, both released in 2011.
- Ivan Simonovis, former Secretary of Public Safety of the city of Caracas.
- General Francisco Usón, released in 2007.
- General Ovidio Poggioli, released in 2006.
- Leopoldo López, former mayor of Chacao and leader of Popular Will.

== See also ==
- Torture in Venezuela
