= Tamara Sujú =

Venezuelan lawyer

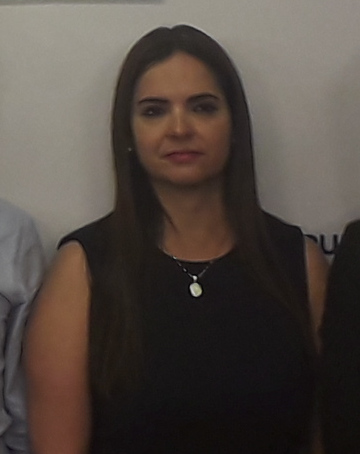
- Tamara Sujú in 2018
- Born: Caracas, Venezuela
- Education: Andrés Bello Catholic University

Tamara Sujú Roa is a Venezuelan criminal lawyer and human rights specialist. Sujú has played a predominant role in the fight for human rights in Venezuela, using her platforms to advocate for justice and spread awareness of the crimes committed by the Venezuelan government.

== Career ==
Tamara Sujú, a graduate of Andrés Bello Catholic University, is the founder of several Non-Governmental Organizations (NGOs), including Fundación Nueva Conciencia Nacional and Damas en Blanco en Venezuela and Fundapresos. Additionally, Sujú is the Executive Director and CEO of the Centro de Estudios para América Latina (CASLA) Institute, one of the main platforms for Latin American studies which advocates for human rights and strives to provide legal support to incarcerated individuals. She has expressed that her primary mission is to serve as the voice for those who don't have one, and to create awareness across European countries about the conditions of Latin American countries. She is also a Senior Fellow at the Raoul Wallenberg Centre for Human Rights, and is a columnist with La Razón, an independent media outfit in Caracas. Finally, she is the former International Director of Foro Penal, which provides unpaid legal assistance to Venezuelans who are detained or tortured, and issues an annual report on cases of torture and cruel treatment in Venezuela.

== Exile ==
In August 2014, Tamara requested political asylum in Prague after fearing "for her freedom and physical integrity"; the international protection status was granted by the government of the Czech Republic for a period of ten renewable years on 24 November. This was after Sujú was accused by Venezuelan government officials of committing destabilization acts and pointed her out as the niece of General Oswaldo Sujú, who was involved in the 2002 coup d'état attempt. Sujú was not only linked to her uncle's affairs, but she also defended him during his legal cases, claiming that the evidence that was found against him was staged and unreliable. Nicolás Maduro, while president of the National Assembly, declared that she "betrayed the fatherland" and that she was a part of the CIA. In exile, Sujú has remained committed to advocating for justice and freedom in Venezuela. In the Czech Republic, she has the freedom of spreading her message around Europe, visiting Parliaments and NGOs. Sujú has received threats from the Venezuelan government while in exile. In January 2021, the son of the president, Nicolás Maduro, took legal action against her due to a tweet in which she spoke about Maduro's and the government's affiliations with criminal activities. In an interview published by Europa Press, Sujú has interpreted this legal movement as a persecution against her.

== Public Activism ==
Alongside her career as a lawyer, Sujú is credited for the largest recompilation of torture, violence and arbitrary detention cases in Venezuela, collecting testimonials from more that 400 victims. On 5 April 2017, Sujú was invited by the InterAmerican Institute for Democracy to testify about the torture cases in Venezuela and the country's expedient in the Court. Her expedient started with 65 incidents when presented before the Court, and was updated in May 2017. On 14 September 2017, she testified about 289 cases of torture during the first audience of the Organization of American States (OAS) to analyze possible crimes against humanity in the country, including incidents during the 2017 Venezuelan protests and 192 cases of sexual torture.

In September 2014, Sujú led a lawsuit with the support of six Latin American countries in the International Criminal Court, filed against Maduro. This lawsuit accused Maduro of committing crimes against humanity which have allegedly taken place in Venezuela since February 2014, when the first wave of opposition protests broke out. She also formalized a demand against President Maduro in July 2016.

During the 2024 Venezuelan presidential election, Sujú maintained her active role in advocating for justice. She expressed her concerns toward the government's actions against civilians who spoke out against the regime. In August 2024, many Venezuelans protested after President Maduro's disputed victory, and in response, Maduro's government marked the households of those who played a part in such manifestations. Sujú declared this as Nazi-like practices, and reinforced that it was a vandalization of private property to identify opponents and demonstrators.

Sujú has also spread awareness about the prison system in Venezuela. In March 2025, she worked with the NGO Justicia, Encuentro y Perdón, to inform the public about the inhumane conditions inside of the Yare II Penitentiary Center, where hundreds of political prisoners are held. The organization urged for the immediate cessation of torturous tactics, and demanded the protection of the rights of the inmates. The opposition party during the 2024 election, Vente Venezuela, replicated the denunciation with the intent of reaching the international community to address this issue.

== See also ==
- List of people granted asylum
