= Leo López (footballer) =

Spanish footballer

Personal information
- Full name: Leonardo López Jiménez
- Date of birth: 15 October 1970 (age 56)
- Place of birth: Tarragona, Spain
- Height: 1.63 m (5 ft 4 in)
- Position: Right back

Team information
- Current team: Ascó (coach)

Youth career
- La Granja
- Barcelona
- Sant Gabriel
- Sabadell

Senior career*
Years	Team	Apps	(Gls)
1989–1990	Torreforta		
1990–1992	Andorra	66	(6)
1992–1993	Manlleu	33	(1)
1993–1994	Andorra	27	(3)
1994–1995	Espanyol B	30	(3)
1995–1997	Palamós	70	(3)
1997–1998	Sabadell	31	(3)
1998–2001	Gimnàstic	73	(1)
2001–2004	Lorca Deportiva CF	69	(5)
Total		399	(25)

Managerial career
- 2004–2008: Lorca Deportiva CF (assistant)
- 2006: Lorca Deportiva CF (interim)
- 2009–2011: La Hoya Lorca
- 2011–2012: Atlético Pulpileño
- 2012–2013: Lorca CFB
- 2013–2014: Totana
- 2014–2015: CF Lorca Deportiva
- 2015–2016: PM Ciudad del Sol
- 2016–2017: Atlético Pulpileño
- 2017–2018: Gimnàstic (youth)
- 2018–: Ascó
- * Club domestic league appearances and goals

Leonardo "Leo" López Jiménuez (born 15 October 1970) is a Spanish retired footballer who played as a right back, and is the current manager of FC Ascó.
