= Eligio Cedeño =

Venezuelan banker

Eligio Cedeño (born 1 December 1964; Caracas, Venezuela) is a president of CEDEL Group, Venezuela. He is in the United States, having been released on bail from charges in Venezuela of circumventing government currency rules to gain U.S. dollars. Over the next year prosecutors repeatedly failed to turn up for court dates, leading to accusations that the case was being strung out due to a lack of evidence. The United Nations' Working Group on Arbitrary Detention in September 2009 declared Cedeño's detention arbitrary partly as a result, and judge María Lourdes Afiuni would release him on this basis. Due to her decision to free Cedeño, Judge Afiuni was herself jailed.

== Background ==
Cedeño was born in Caracas, Venezuela, on 1 December 1964. He attended the University Simon Rodríguez in Caracas and earned a degree in Business Administration. Cedeño began work at an early age as a bank apprentice and was president of Bolivar-BanPro Financial Group, S.A. in Venezuela. He had previously been President of Banco Canarias de Venezuela (2001–2005).

== Arrest and release ==
In 2007 Cedeño, then President of Bolivar-Banpro Financial Group, was arrested in a crackdown by Venezuelan officials on individuals circumventing government currency rules to gain U.S. dollars. On 8 February 2007, Cedeño was accused by the Venezuelan Attorney General of aiding Consorcio MicroStar with illegal dollar transactions. He was accused by authorities of helping the company obtain over $25 million from the currency exchange board in order to pay for computer imports that never entered Venezuela. Over the next year prosecutors repeatedly failed to turn up for court dates, leading to accusations that the case was being strung out due to a lack of evidence. Partly as a result, the United Nations' Working Group on Arbitrary Detention in September 2009 declared Cedeño's detention arbitrary.

Cedeño's lawyers allege that he became a target of the Chávez government, as a consequence of his support for political opponents of Chávez. In addition to providing financial support to politicians, he provided assistance to union leader Carlos Ortega and columnist Patricia Poleo, both of whom would later be forced to flee Venezuela and seek political asylum. Further, still according to Cedeno's lawyers, the criminal charges against Cedeño appear to have been part of an orchestrated effort to force him to sell bank assets to individuals close to Chávez at an enormous discount. Cedeño's lawyers argued that the case "identifies the typical pattern employed by the pliant judiciary to attack Chávez's political opponents".

Held in jail pending trial for 34 months, Cedeño was paroled on 10 December 2009 by judge María Lourdes Afiuni. By the 19th Cedeño had fled to the United States, where he was detained by U.S. Immigration and Customs Enforcement until 23 December 2009 when he was released on parole pending an immigration hearing. Due to her decision to liberate Cedeño, Judge Afiuni was herself jailed.

On Wednesday, 18 May 2011, Judge Lourdes Martinez-Esquivel approved United States asylum for Eligio Cedeño in a Miami immigration court. Victor Cerda, his immigration attorney, said "the decision is objective proof that Eligio Cedeño was a political prisoner. Contrary to President Chávez's assertions, he is not a criminal."

== See also ==
- Political prisoners in Venezuela
