= Leopoldo López =

Venezuelan politician

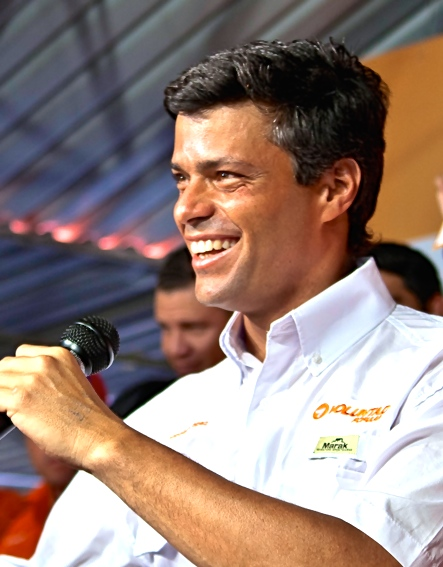
- López in 2012

National Coordinator of Voluntad Popular
- Incumbent
- Assumed office 5 December 2009
- Preceded by: Position established

Presidential Commissioner for the Government Center of Venezuela
- In office 28 August 2019 – 5 January 2023
- President: Juan Guaidó
- Preceded by: Position established
- Succeeded by: Position abolished

Mayor of Chacao
- In office 30 July 2000 – 9 December 2008
- Preceded by: Cornelio Popesco
- Succeeded by: Emilio Graterón

Personal details
- Born: Leopoldo Eduardo López Mendoza; 29 April 1971 (age 55) Caracas, Republic of Venezuela
- Party: Voluntad Popular
- Spouse: Lilian Tintori
- Children: 3
- Parent(s): Leopoldo López Gil; Antonieta Mendoza de López
- Education: The Hun School of Princeton, New Jersey; Kenyon College; Harvard Kennedy School
- Occupation: Economist
- Awards: Sakharov Prize (2017)
- Website: leopoldolopez.com

Leopoldo Eduardo López Mendoza (born 29 April 1971) is a Venezuelan opposition leader. López was elected mayor of the Chacao Municipality of Caracas in the regional elections held in July 2000. He is the National Coordinator of the political party, Voluntad Popular, which he founded in 2009. He is a Venezuelan politician, economist, and sociologist.

Administrative sanctions were imposed on López by Venezuela's Comptroller's Office in 2004, disqualifying him from holding public office for six years (beginning in 2008, at the completion of his term as mayor, until 2014), following allegations of nepotism and misappropriation of funds. Opposition groups in Venezuela criticized these charges as fabricated. López supporters say he was never charged with a crime, tried, or allowed to rebut the allegations; he sued Venezuela and his case was reviewed by the Inter-American Court of Human Rights, which issued a unanimous ruling in his favor. The ruling was ignored by Venezuelan officials.

During the crisis in Venezuela, he called for protests in February 2014. He was arrested on 18 February 2014 and charged with arson and conspiracy; murder and terrorism charges were dropped. Human rights groups expressed concern that the charges were politically motivated. His imprisonment in Ramo Verde was controversial; the UN High Commissioner for Human Rights called for the release of those arrested in connection with the protests. Opinion polls in late 2014 showed that López had become one of the most popular politicians in Venezuela following his arrest. In September 2015, he was found guilty of public incitement to violence through supposed subliminal messages, being involved with criminal association, and was sentenced to 13 years and 9 months in prison.

The European Union, Amnesty International, Human Rights Watch and several human rights organizations have condemned the arrest and defined it as politically motivated. Several figures involved with his trial later declared that they were pressured by the Venezuelan government to detain López. Franklin Nieves, the prosecutor that accused him, called the judicial process a "farce" and said that Nicolás Maduro pressured him and Public Ministry superiors to defend "false evidence" against López. Ralenis Tovar, the judge that signed the arrest warrant against Leopoldo, declared that she signed the warrant because she felt scared after being threatened with becoming a "second Lourdes Afiuni judge". Chief Prosecutor Luisa Ortega Díaz said that she was pressured by Diosdado Cabello to accuse López of the deaths of Bassil Da Costa and Juan Montoya.

He was later transferred to house arrest on 8 July 2017 after being imprisoned for over three years. On 1 August 2017 he was taken from his home by SEBIN agents and was briefly imprisoned once again in Ramo Verde. Since then, López returned home and remained under house arrest from 5 August 2017 until it was reported that López had been released on 30 April 2019, in the wake of the 2019 Venezuelan uprising. As the former attempt to overthrow Maduro's government fell apart, López took refuge as a guest in the Spanish Embassy in Caracas. He fled Venezuela in October 2020.

== Early life and career ==
López Mendoza was born on 29 April 1971 in Caracas; his mother Antonieta Mendoza de López was vice president of corporate affairs at the media conglomerate, Cisneros Group, while his father, Leopoldo López Gil, held an executive editorial position at El Nacional and became a Member of the European Parliament in 2019. He has two sisters, Diana and Adriana López.

López is descended from prominent Venezuelans, including a former president. His mother is the daughter of Eduardo Mendoza Goiticoa, who was Secretary of Agriculture for two years during the first presidency of Rómulo Betancourt (1945 to 1948). Through her, López is the great-great-great-grandson of the country's first president, Cristóbal Mendoza. He is also the great-great-grand nephew of Simón Bolívar. Bolivar's sister, Juana Bolivar, is López's great-great-great-great-grandmother, making him one of Bolívar's living relatives. His great-uncle Rafael Ernesto López Ortega was Minister of Education during the presidency of López Contreras. His grandfather Leopoldo López Ortega and great-uncle Rafael Ernesto López Ortega were both doctors, founders of the Centro Medico of San Bernardino in Caracas. López's cousin is Thor Halvorssen, president of the Human Rights Foundation.

López studied at Colegio Los Arcos and Colegio Santiago de León de Caracas and graduated from boarding school in the US at the Hun School of Princeton, where he was captain of the crew and swim teams, and vice president of the student council. In 1989, López told the student newspaper at the Hun School, The Mall, that "Being away from home created an awakening of the responsibility I have towards the people of my country. I belong to one percent of the privileged people, and achieving a good education will hopefully enable me to do something to help my country." A fellow student described him as being "very good at getting people psyched" on the swimming and crew teams.

In 1993, López graduated from Kenyon College where he received degrees in Economics and Sociology. A college friend said in 2014 that during their student days López had founded a student group called Active Students Helping the Earth Survive. He attended Harvard Kennedy School, where he obtained a Master of Public Policy in 1996.

López worked as an analyst and consultant for the chief economist to the Planning Vice-President of Petróleos de Venezuela S.A. (PDVSA) between 1996 and 1999; he was a professor of Institutional Economy in the Economics Department at Universidad Católica Andrés Bello.

== Political career ==
López cofounded the political party Primero Justicia (Justice First) with Julio Borges in 1992. He later moved away from Justice First, having a more leftist-leaning political philosophy and created the Voluntad Popular party, a member of Socialist International.

According to a 2006 article in the Los Angeles Times, the Venezuelan government seemed to have "a full-out campaign" against López starting from 1998. Described by Kenyon College as "hardworking and unpretentious", with "movie-star good looks and a gentle way with people that has made him extremely popular in Chacao, the most affluent of Caracas's five municipalities", he said, "I was born with a lot of privilege in a country with a lot of inequality."

=== Mayor of Chacao (2000–2008) ===
López was elected mayor of Chacao Municipality in 2000 with 51% of the vote and re-elected in 2004 with 81%. He was praised by constituents "for revamping the public health system and building new public spaces". His term of office saw the opening of the Juan de Dios Guanche school and the Centro Deportivo Eugenio Mendoza, a sports center. Under López, work began on several major construction projects, including the Palos Grandes plaza, the new seat of the Mercado Libre, a new headquarters for the Andrés Bello Education Unit, and a massive underground parking facility. According to a 2010 article in Businessweek magazine, López tried to reorganize the Chacao police force around a new CompStat policing model, implemented with apparent success in a neighboring city of Catia, Caracas, but says that, although "we could do the police management [and] get accurate measurements" in his district, he lacked the support of the attorney general to implement these reforms. The Atlantic described him as having "earned a reputation among local voters and Venezuelans ... for transparent, effective governance".

As mayor, López won first-prize awards from Transparency International in 2007 and 2008 for running the country's most honest and efficient municipal administration. In 2008, he won third place in the World Mayors contest which nominates the "world's most outstanding mayors". The City Mayors Foundation, which sponsors the contest, wrote that "It would be easy to caricature him as the scion of the country's wealthy elite, standing in the way of Chávez' social justice crusade. But López' record on activism has shown a commitment to promoting legal equality and his constituents speak passionately about a mayor who has delivered on public services and funding new infrastructure."

During events surrounding the 2002 Venezuelan coup d'état attempt, NPR said López "orchestrated the public protests against President Hugo Chávez and played a central role in the citizen's arrest of Chavez's interior minister", Ramón Rodríguez Chacín. López later tried to distance himself from that event, maintaining his actions were meant to protect Chacín from an angry mob. López did not sign the Carmona Decree drawn up on the day after the 2002 Venezuelan coup attempt, which established a transitional government and dissolved government entities.

=== Target of violence ===
López was affected by violent confrontations multiple times in his political career, including incidents involving gunfire targeting him. In one attack, López's car was fired upon and was left full of bullet holes. In February 2006, a group of armed individuals stormed a university auditorium where López was speaking and took him hostage for six hours. A month later in March 2006, López's bodyguard who was sitting in López's regular seat was shot several times and was killed. In June 2008, after López returned from a visit to Washington, D.C., he was allegedly detained and assaulted by the state intelligence service; the Venezuelan government disputed this account, stating that a member of the Venezuelan National Guard reported López as being responsible for the aggression and presented a video as evidence.

=== 2008 election controversy ===
In an April 2008 ruling announced by Venezuela's chief prosecutor and then upheld by court decision, López and several hundred other Venezuelans were barred from running in the November 2008 elections, for reasons of alleged corruption. Eighty percent of those barred belonged to the opposition. The Venezuelan government's ruling found that in 1998, López, while working for Petróleos de Venezuela S.A. (PDVSA) and his mother, who was the company's manager of public affairs, awarded a state-funded grant to the Primero Justicia Civil Association, an organization of which López was a member. As the best-known banned politician, López contested the sanction, arguing that the right to hold elected office could only be rescinded in the wake of a civil or criminal trial. He said the government had banned opposition candidates ahead of the November 2008 regional elections because it knew they could win.

In June 2008, López brought his case to the Inter-American Commission on Human Rights (IACHR) in Washington, D.C., challenging the claims by stating that none of those punished had been charged, prosecuted and found guilty through due process of law, in direct violation of treatises signed by the Venezuelan government and the Venezuelan constitution. In July, the Commission agreed to hear his case and commented that the two years that had elapsed since López had filed a motion asking the Court to annul the ban constituted an "undue delay".

The IACHR ruled unanimously that López "should be allowed to run for office". Venezuela's Supreme Court (TSJ) declared the ruling "unenforceable", stating that the disqualification from holding public office was a legal sanction, not a political one, and that López was still able to register as a candidate for office and participate in elections. This ruling barred López from running against Chavez for the following election, which polls indicated López would have won.

Although López and others accused of corruption were never tried or convicted, the Venezuelan government maintained that the administrative disqualification from holding public office was grounded in Article 289 of the Venezuelan Constitution—which grants the comptroller general authority to oversee and regulate public offices, investigate irregularities and apply administrative penalties to persons holding those offices—and Article 105 of the Organic Law of the Office of the Comptroller General of the Republic. The Constitutional Chamber of the Supreme Tribunal ruled in August 2008 that the sanction against López and others was constitutional.

Following the decision by the Venezuelan government, multiple organizations criticized the government's ruling as a symptom of its judicial system's lack of independence. The Wall Street Journal stated that six of the seven Supreme Court justices were "sympathetic to the president". The Wall Street Journal also said that the ban "has elicited comparisons to moves by Iran's government preventing opposition politicians from running in elections in that country" and singled López out as "a popular opposition politician who polls say would have a good chance at becoming the mayor of Caracas, one of the most important posts in the country". BBC News called the list of individuals barred from office a "blacklist," noting that there was "little that Mr López and others" could do to participate in the November 2008 elections. The Economist stated that López was the "main apparent target" of the "decision by the auditor-general to ban hundreds of candidates from standing in the state and municipal elections for alleged corruption, even though none has been convicted by the courts". The Carter Center expressed regret that the Venezuelan Supreme Court did not find it feasible to comply with the IACHR's decision. The Human Rights Watch "described political discrimination as a defining feature of Mr. Chávez's presidency," singling out López and the "measure that disqualifies candidates from running for public office because of legal claims against them". The Organization of American States cited the case against López as one of the "factors that contribute to the weakening of the rule of law and democracy in Venezuela." The Associated Press reported that the use of the charges to disqualify López "is a tactic critics say Chavez uses to put his opponents' political ambitions on indefinite hold".

The next day, López and others protested the ruling in a demonstration, until they were blocked in front of a government building.

López again filed a complaint, this time with the Human Rights Commission of the international Mercosur Parliament, on which Argentina, Brazil, Paraguay and Uruguay are represented, and on which Venezuela has observer status. Two members of the commission traveled to Caracas to investigate, but were unable to come to any conclusion because Venezuelan officials refused to meet with them. Three years after the controversy began, López was cleared of all of the charges of corruption.

=== Voluntad Popular ===
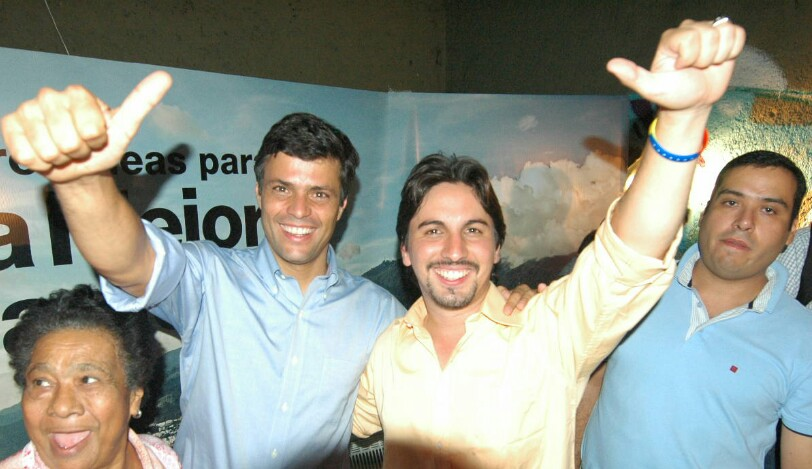
López with Voluntad Popular party official, Freddy Guevara in 2011

On 5 December 2009, López launched the political party Voluntad Popular, saying "What we want is to build a new majority from the bottom up - not just through negotiations and agreements between elites. It's a longer road, but for us, it's the only road that gives us possibilities of winning." López described Voluntad Popular as "a social and political, pluralistic and democratic movement" that stood for "the rights of all Venezuelans." An analyst close to López said that he would create political groups and leave them when they grew beyond his control. The party did not have a solid policy platform and mainly served as a vehicle of anti-Chavismo. According to The Guardian, US diplomatic cables at the time (one titled "The López Problem") stated: "He is often described as arrogant, vindictive, and power-hungry – but party officials also concede his popularity, charisma and talent as an organiser".

The same year, regarding education in Venezuela, he called for the creation of grassroots groups, similar to a PTA, in every school to ensure the quality of schools and the education received by children and youth – "A people's network in every school."

=== 2014 protests in Venezuela ===
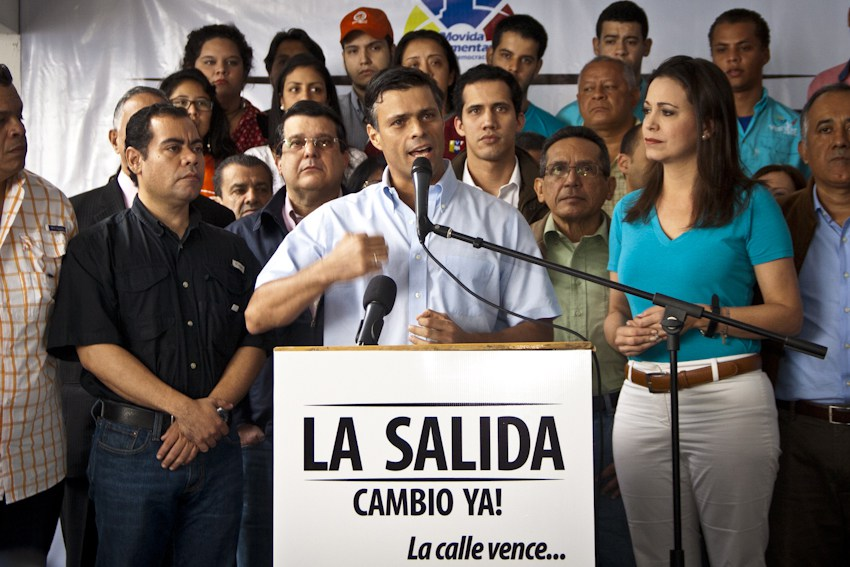
Leopoldo López and María Corina Machado, presenting La Salida. Juan Guaidó is behind.

The Economist reported in February 2014 that while Henrique Capriles headed the moderate wing of Democratic Unity Roundtable (MUD) – the alliance of Venezuelan opposition parties – López headed "the more confrontational wing". Both advocated nonviolence, while López, unlike Capriles, "believe[d] that demonstrations can prompt a change of government". On 12 February 2014, López called on Venezuelans to peacefully protest against the Venezuelan government. The same day, Venezuelan prosecutors, after likening López and protesters to "Nazis", issued an arrest warrant for López on charges including instigation of delinquency, public intimidation, arson of a public building, damage to public property, severe injury, "incitement to riot", homicide, and terrorism.

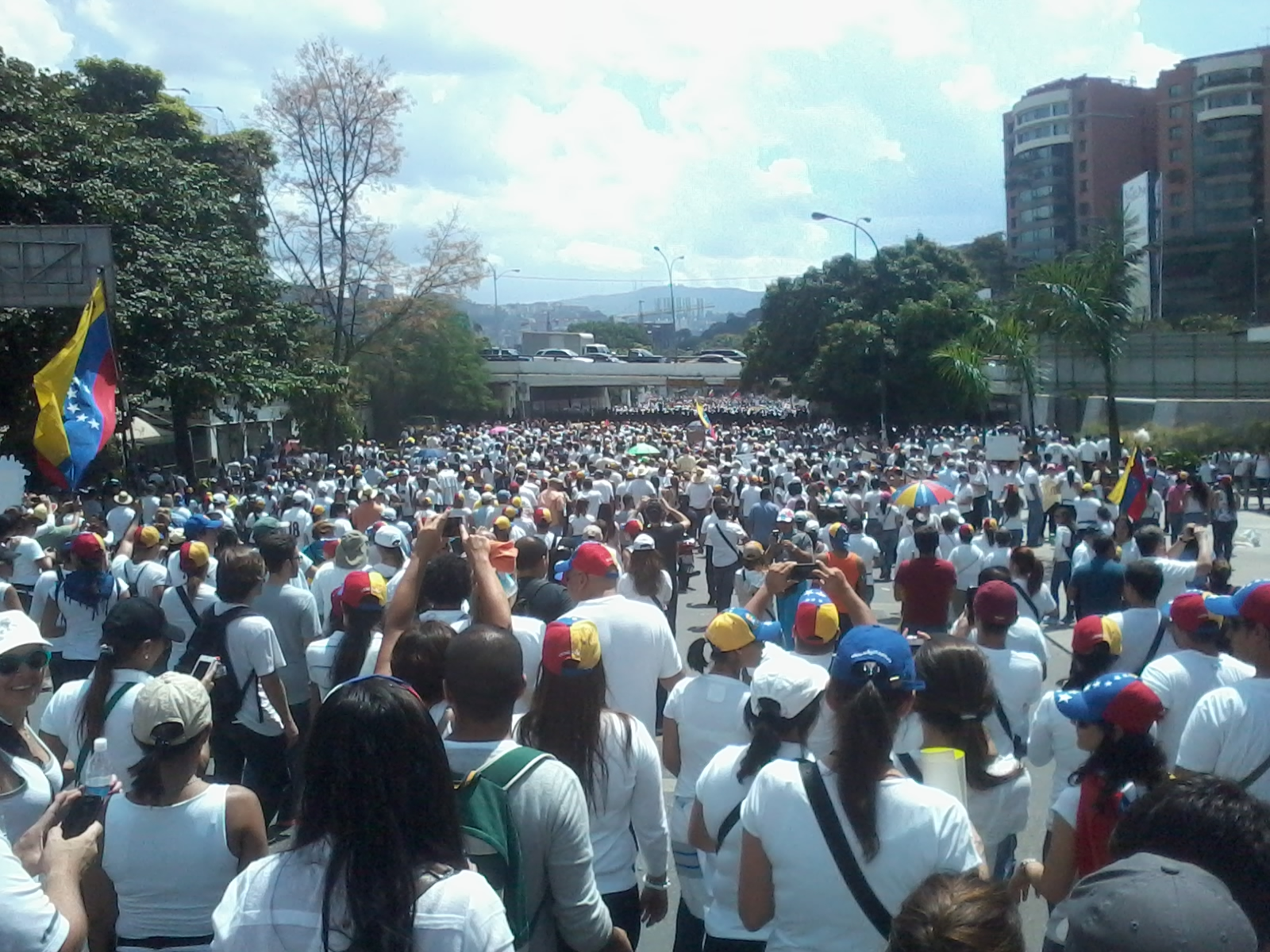
A protest in Las Mercedes, Caracas shortly after López was arrested

The day after the warrant was issued, López used Twitter to address Venezuelan President Nicolás Maduro: "Don't you have the guts to arrest me? Or are you waiting for orders from Havana? I tell you, the truth is on our side." In a late-night nationally televised broadcast on 16 February, according to Reuters, "Maduro told López to hand himself in 'without a show,' and said he had rejected pressure from Washington to drop the case against him." Maduro "said he had ordered three U.S. consular officials to leave the country for conspiring against his government", and declared: "Venezuela doesn't take orders from anyone!"

External videos
- López speaking to large crowds of supporters during his arrest. He had to tell protesters to make a path for authorities. on YouTube

On 18 February, López turned himself in to the National Guard in the presence of thousands of cheering supporters, who, like him, wore white as a symbol of nonviolence. He gave a short speech in which he said that he hoped his arrest would awaken Venezuela to the corruption and economic disaster caused by socialist rule. The only alternative to accepting arrest, he said, standing on a statue of Jose Marti, was to "leave the country, and I will never leave Venezuela!" Hours after the arrest, Maduro addressed a cheering crowd of supporters in red, saying that he would not tolerate "psychological warfare" by his opponents and that López must be held responsible for his "treasonous acts". López's wife told CNN that night "that López was in good spirits behind bars" and added: "The last thing he told me was don't forget why this is happening, don't forget why he's going to jail. He's asking for the liberation of political prisoners and students and an end to repression and violence."

On 20 February, Supervisory Judge Ralenis Tovar Guillén issued a pre-trial detention order against López in response to formal charges of conspiracy, incitement to commit crimes, arson, and damage to public property with the charges ordered by public prosecutor Franklin Nieves. López was formally charged at an arraignment that took place inside a military bus parked outside the prison, a process described by Gutierrez as "very unorthodox".

== Imprisonment ==
López was serving a 13-year sentence for crimes including instigation of delinquency, arson, damage to public property, "incitement to riot", and terrorism. The charges have been labeled by organizations or legislative bodies outside of Venezuela as politically motivated. Human rights groups around the globe have called for López' release due to the government's negligent handling of the trial. Since out of nearly 700 total hours of court testimonies the defense spoke for less than three, the trial has been called a farce.

=== Initial detention ===
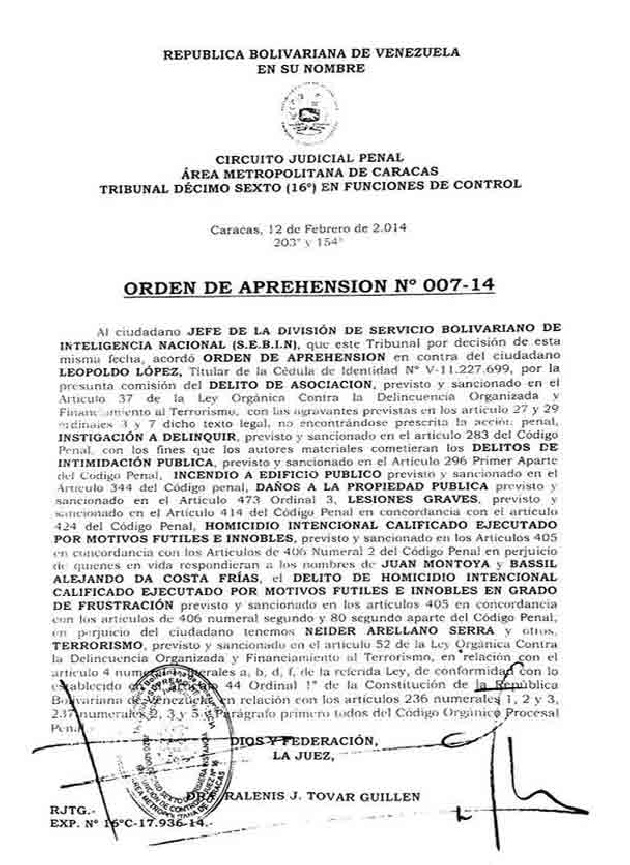
Detention order against Leopoldo López

López was denied bail and imprisoned at the Ramo Verde military prison outside of Caracas. While in prison, his family visited him every week, only being allowed to stay for a few hours and deliver lunch. They had to undergo strict searches by guards. López grew a beard and began learning how to play the cuatro. López, a devout Catholic, was not allowed to attend mass or have a priest visit but has been allowed to have an hour of exercise outside each day.

In July 2014, his wife stated that his visitation rights had been revoked and that he was subjected to psychological torture, including isolation. This was also stated by the Venezuelan government in the Inter-American Court of Human Rights. It was also reported that prison guards would throw feces against López's jail cell. Chilean lawyer and secretary of a mission of Socialist International, José Antonio Viera-Gallo, stated that in the case of López, Socialist International "confirmed human rights violations against a political leader" giving examples of when López and others trying to communicate with their families, authorities sound loud sirens preventing communication.

On 13 February 2015, armed masked men believed to be military used blowtorches to cut through the bars of López and former mayor Daniel Ceballos' prison cells. In May 2015 López announced he was beginning a hunger strike to protest his detention and the mismanagement of the Maduro government. He has urged other jailed opposition to join, with Daniel Ceballos also participating in the hunger strike. Both López and Ceballos ceased the hunger strike after one of their demands, a date set for the 2015 Venezuelan parliamentary elections, were set to take place on 6 December 2015.

=== Trial ===
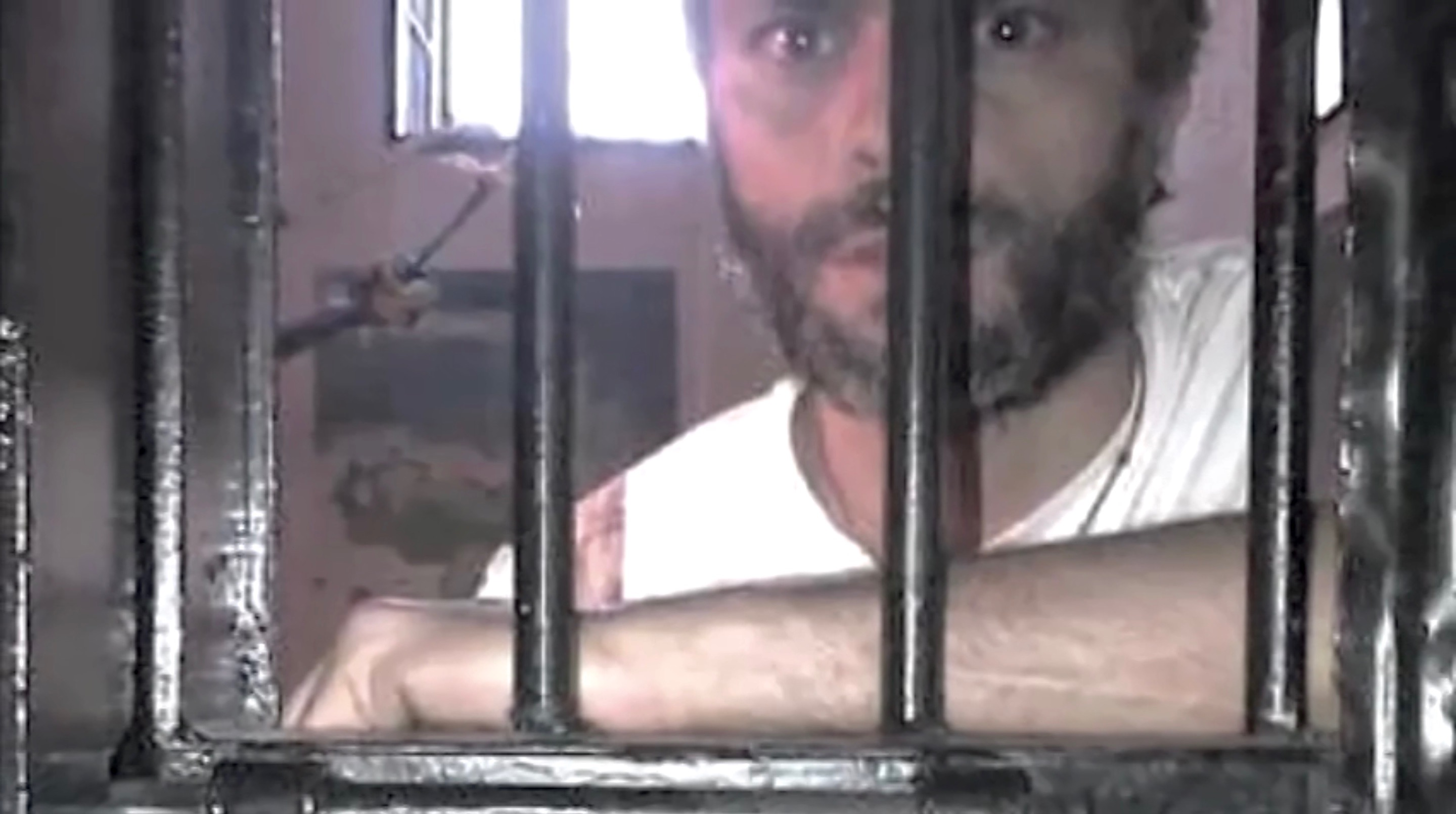
López in Ramo Verde Prison when he was initially detained in 2014

López was set to be tried alongside four students, Marco Coello, Christian Holdack, Ángel González, and Demian Martin. He petitioned the court to release these students, who had been arrested in February. Judge Susana Barreiros ordered the release of all but Christian Holdack. At the beginning of his trial, López's defence was barred from entering the court to present evidence and witnesses. For López's defense, only 1 of 63 witnesses were allowed to be presented in court while over 100 witnesses were allowed to presented for the prosecution. Since López was detained on 18 February 2014, he was held in Ramo Verde Prison while he was tried. López's court dates were on 23 July, 6 August, 13 August and 28 August. At each of those trials, the prosecution presented evidence against López, yet his defense was allegedly not able to present any information or evidence supporting him. After the court session of 28 August, the case was deferred for a third time to 10 September. The 28 August court session was also under the presence of a delegate of the European Union, allegedly due to concerns about the trial's process. In November 2014, the Venezuelan court rejected the United Nations' Working Group on Arbitrary Detentions request to release López from prison. The United Nations, along with several other organizations and institutions, have criticized the trial due to a lack of due process in the court's handling of the case, as well as a lack of fair hearing for the defense, who had under three hours to defend themselves to the government's 600 hours. The government's use of delays to silence witnesses for the defense, as well as their direct barring of 58 of 60 witnesses, was also condemned.

On 4 January 2015, in response to US requests to free López, Maduro offered to exchange López "man to man" for Oscar López Rivera, a former FALN member imprisoned in the U.S. for seditious conspiracy, use of force to commit robbery, interstate transportation of firearms, and conspiracy to transport explosives with intent to destroy government property. The Obama administration commuted López Rivera's sentence, with his release in May 2017.

In March 2015, former socialist Prime Minister of Spain Felipe González agreed to take over the defense of López in his trial after his family requested his assistance. In the roughly 700 hours of court testimonies, López's defense was given less than three hours and was not allotted many resources or due process.

==== Sentence ====
If the sentence condemns me you will be more fearful to read it than I will be to hear it, because you know that I'm innocent

— López in pre-sentencing speech, 2015

On 10 September 2015, after spending over a year and a half imprisoned in Ramo Verde, López's trial was set to conclude. According to López's lawyers, Judge Susana Barreiros suddenly finished proceedings the preceding week, with López only permitted to use a few witnesses while the prosecution was granted the use of hundreds of witnesses.

At the courthouse, about 200 supporters of López gathered while government supporters grouped together with a band singing folk songs supporting a guilty verdict against López. The gatherings grew violent after government supporters attacked López supporters and left them with multiple injuries and one death. Before the conclusion of the trial, López addressed the courtroom with a three-hour speech. Judge Susana Barreiros found López guilty and gave him the maximum sentence of 13 years, 9 months, 7 days, and 12 hours in Ramo Verde military prison for public incitement of violence; student movement co-defendants received sentences ranging from 4 and 10 years. López was then allowed to spend moments with his family before he was sent back to his isolation cell in Ramo Verde. López's supporters then moved to another part of the city to demonstrate while the banging of pots by other Venezuelans could be heard from their homes.

==== Controversy and international reaction ====
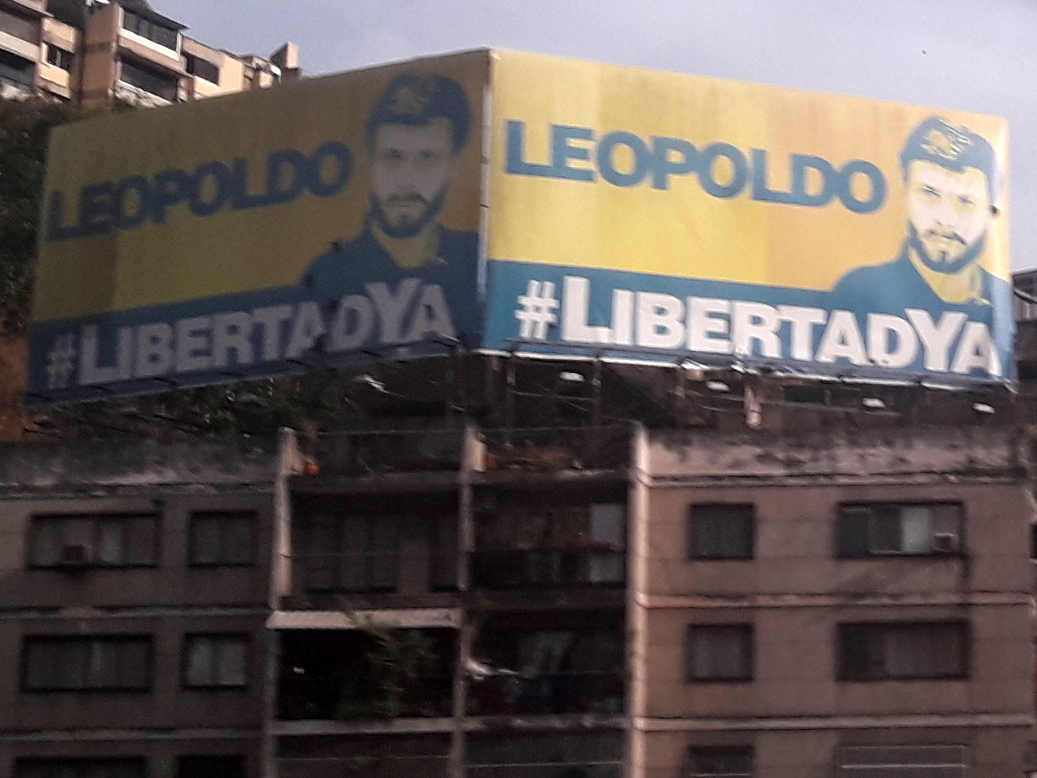
Billboard in Caracas demanding Leopoldo's release.

The European Union, Amnesty International, Human Rights Watch and several human rights organizations have condemned the arrest and defined it as politically motivated. Several figures involved with his trial later declared that they were pressured by the Venezuelan government to detain López.

On 23 October 2015, Franklin Nieves, a prosecutor in López's trial who fled to the United States, stated that the trial was a "farce" and that he was pressured by high officials in the Venezuelan government. Nieves said that Brigadier General Manuel Gregorio Bernal Martinez, then head of SEBIN, was directly ordered by President Maduro to arrest López and others. When Nieves asked for documentation of any crimes, Bernal did not have any but a SEBIN officer created the documents needed to persecute López, with Nieves stating, "They made up those facts in the moment." Nieves also accused Diosdado Cabello, leader of the National Assembly, of directing the López trial as well. Luisa Ortega Díaz, the Chief Prosecutor of Venezuela who reportedly asked prosecutors to build evidence against López, denied Nieves' allegations, saying that "If he was pressured, it was undoubtedly by foreign elements." Luisa Ortega would later say that she was pressured by Diosdado Cabello to accuse López of the deaths of Bassil Da Costa and Juan Montoya. Ralenis Tovar, the judge that signed the arrest warrant against Leopoldo, declared that she signed the warrant because she felt scared after being threatened with becoming a "second Lourdes Afiuni judge".

Human rights groups consider López as "Latin America's most prominent political prisoner". Multiple organizations denounced López's detention and published discussions about it in order to bring attention to his arrest. Human Rights Watch said: "The Venezuelan government has openly embraced the classic tactics of an authoritarian regime, jailing its opponents, muzzling the media, and intimidating civil society." HRW further accused the Maduro government of blaming opposition leaders, including López, for violence. The Human Rights Foundation, founded and run by López's first cousin, Thor Halvorssen Mendoza, declared López a prisoner of conscience and joined other international organizations in calling for his immediate release. "With López's imprisonment and the brutally repressive tactics that police, armed forces, and paramilitary groups are using against his supporters, the Venezuelan state has lost any democratic façade it may have had", said HRF chairman Garry Kasparov. Former students from Kenyon College put forth an effort to support López since he was detained and helped create freeleopoldo.com. Editorial columns from The New York Times and The Washington Post have also called for his release.

At the 2014 Clinton Global Initiative meeting, U.S. President Barack Obama called for the release of López saying, "We stand in solidarity with those who are detained at this very moment." The United Nations Working Group on Arbitrary Detention ruled in 2014 that López was detained arbitrarily and that the Venezuelan government "violated several of their civil, political and constitutional rights" while demanding his immediate release. The UN High Commissioner for Human Rights, Zeid Ra'ad al-Hussein, called for the immediate release of López and all Venezuelans arrested during the 2014 protests. In November 2014, Socialist International agreed with the UN's ruling, calling López's arrest arbitrary. On 19 December 2014, the chief diplomat of the European Union, Federica Mogherini, said that she was "seriously concerned" about "continuous arbitrary arrests" in Venezuela, with the EU resolution noting that Leopoldo López "suffered physical and psychological torture" and also denounced the situations of opposition mayors Daniel Ceballos and Vicencio Scarano.

The Venezuelan government condemned the statements by the United States and the United Nations demanding them to not interfere in Venezuelan affairs. The Venezuelan government replied to the UN High Commissioner for Human Rights with a letter directed to him stating that it was "senseless" to release López and claimed that Prince Zeid bin Ra'ad's statements were "undoubtedly part of the international media manipulation that has been denounced by the top leadership of the Bolivarian Government".

In 2016, the Dalai Lama supported López, with human rights attorney Tamara Sujú sharing a picture on Twitter of the Dalai Lama stating that he continued to pray for López.

Amnesty International said, "The charges brought against Venezuelan opposition leader Leopoldo López smack of a politically motivated attempt to silence dissent in the country." Guadalupe Marengo, Amnesty International Americas Programme Deputy Director, called on Venezuelan authorities to "either present solid evidence to substantiate the charges against López or release him immediately and unconditionally ... Amnesty International has not seen evidence to substantiate these charges. This is an affront to justice and free assembly". After López was sentenced to 13 years in prison, Amnesty International declared that, "Leopoldo López is a prisoner of conscience and should be immediately released without conditions".

=== Post-trial activity ===
External videos
- López shouting from his cell over prison guard whistles while trying to communicate with his mother on YouTube

Days after López was formally sentenced and imprisoned, he wrote an op-ed for The New York Times titled Even in Jail, I Will Fight for a Free Venezuela in which he called for international attention on the state of Venezuela's economy, corruption and crime.

On 26 March 2014, The New York Times published an op-ed by López under the headline "Venezuela's Failing State". Writing from prison, López lamented that for the past fifteen years, "the definition of 'intolerable' in this country has declined". Addressing his incarceration, López wrote that on 12 February, he had "urged Venezuelans to exercise their legal rights to protest and free speech – but to do so peacefully and without violence". López called for "an investigation into fraud committed through our commission for currency exchange", and for "real engagement from the international community, particularly in Latin America". He charged that while international human- rights organizations had been outspoken in condemning Maduro, many of Venezuela's neighbors had responded to his actions with "shameful silence", as had the Organization of American States, which represents nations in the Western Hemisphere.

==== House arrest ====
López chanting "Sí se puede" with supporters following his release from house arrest

According to López's wife, Lilian Tintori, in early June 2017 he rejected an offer from officials of the Venezuelan government, made during the 2017 Venezuelan protests, which would allow him to serve the remainder of his prison term under house arrest. Tintori reported that he said other political prisoners should be released before him and that he "had to be last to leave ... [that it was about] liberty for all of Venezuela".

On 24 June 2017, Leopoldo López shouted from his prison cell that he was being tortured, asking people to denounce it. Tintori shared the video through social media. On 8 July, López left Ramo Verde and was taken home in the company of two Bolivarian officials, Delcy Rodriguez and her brother Jorge Rodriguez, at 3:00am VST. He was placed under house arrest by Venezuela's Supreme Tribunal of Justice, which cited case "irregularities" and health reasons for López's release; Reuters reports that the Bolivarian government "seems to be calculating that his return home may ease domestic protests".

Following the 2017 Venezuelan Constituent Assembly election which granted the Bolivarian government much more authority over Venezuela, SEBIN agents arrived at López's home in the early hours of 1 August 2017, and took him back to prison. But on 5 August 2017, Venezuelan authorities again released López to house arrest. Since then, López has remained under house arrest. According to López, SEBIN agents have been taking a picture of him with a copy of the day's newspaper every day since his return to house arrest. In October 2017, the head of a private security team guarding López and his home was arrested; he has not been seen since. On 17 November 2017, SEBIN officials reinforced the surveillance of López's house, after the former mayor of Caracas, who was in the same situation, fled on the same day to Colombia.

==== Release ====
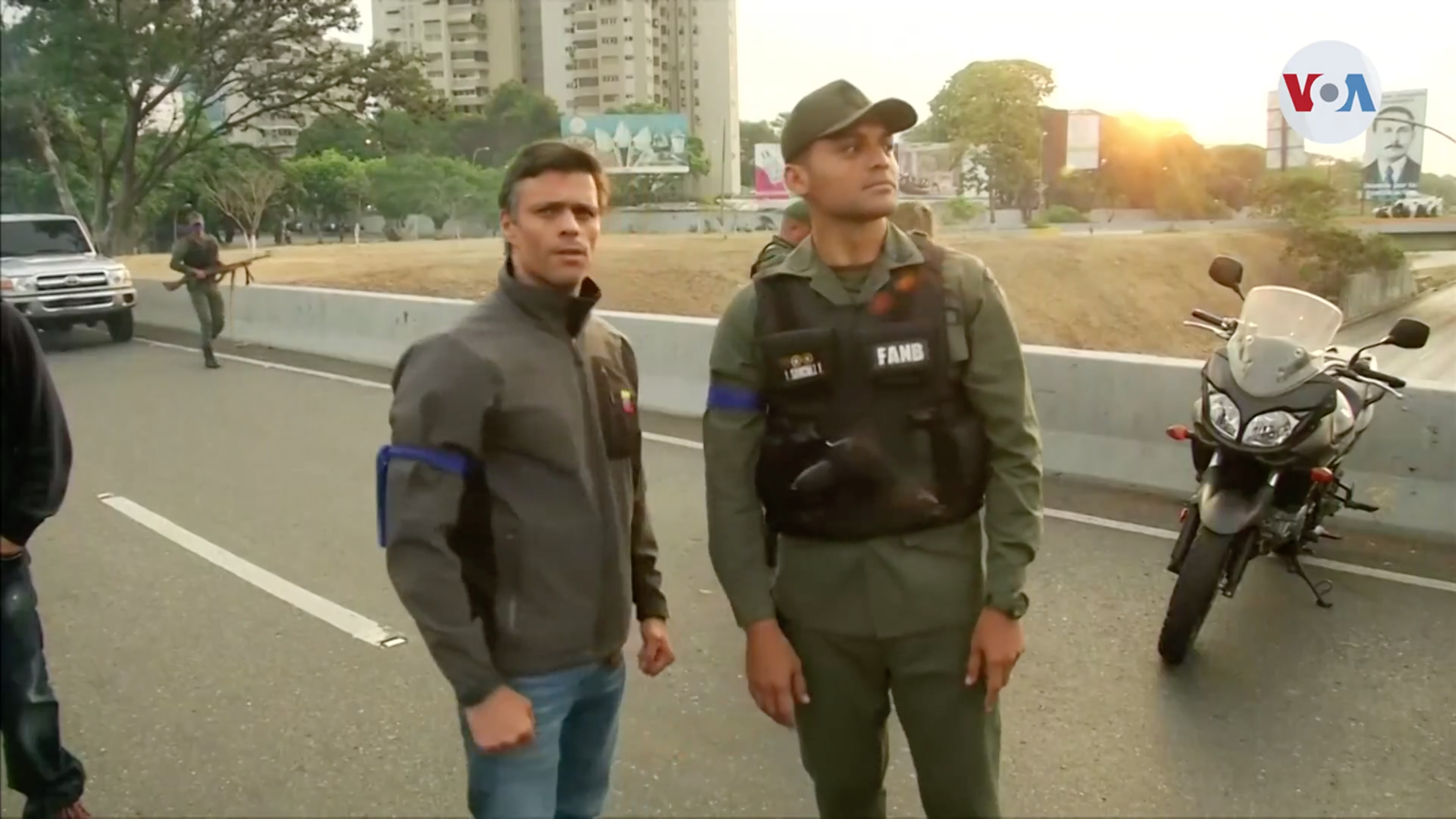
López beside a pro-Guaidó soldier following his release during the 2019 Venezuela uprising

López was released from house arrest on the morning of 30 April during the 2019 Venezuela uprising, with the assistance of defecting armed forces supportive of Juan Guaidó. Later in the day, López and his immediate family entered the Chilean Embassy in Caracas, but moved to the Spanish Embassy in the early hours of 1 May 2019. According to Roberto Ampuero of the Chilean Foreign Ministry, López and his family moved to the Spanish Embassy after a "personal decision", noting that López and his wife both have Spanish ancestry. On 2 May 2019, the Supreme Tribunal issued an arrest warrant for López, who exited the gates of the Spanish Embassy, with his wife Lilian Tintori, to speak with reporters, saying that Maduro's days were numbered. The Spanish government announced that López would not be handed over to Venezuelan authorities.

=== Escape from Spanish Embassy ===
On 24 October 2020, top Venezuelan opposition officials said López had fled Venezuela. López, who is a political mentor to opposition leader Juan Guaidó, had taken refuge in the Spanish ambassador's residence in Caracas since fleeing house arrest after the failure of a military uprising to overthrow Maduro in April 2019.

His political allies and his father said López made his way across the border into Colombia, after spending more than a year inside the Spanish Embassy. López's escape was first reported by the Spanish newspaper El Mundo. A Spanish government source said his arrival in Spain, where his wife now lives, was "imminent." The Spanish foreign ministry said on Twitter that López's decision to leave was "voluntary and personal." López arrived in Madrid on 25 October, and had a meeting with the Spanish prime minister, Pedro Sánchez, on 27 October.

== Exile ==
While living in exile, during a press conference in the Círculo de Bellas Artes, in Madrid, in October 2020 López expressed that his goal now was to have "free and transparent" elections in Venezuela, saying that "we want for Venezuela the same as in Bolivia", referring to the 2020 Bolivian elections, where the Movement for Socialism (MAS) candidate Luis Arce was elected president. In exile, López has also declared that "for a transition to be viable" support from the "Maduro regime" was needed, citing as examples South Africa, Eastern Europe and Spain, but saying that those who have committed human right abuses or crimes against humanity should not be included.

On 9 December 2020, Leopoldo López started a tour in Latin America, travelling to Colombia and seeking to "strengthen" an "international front" against Nicolás Maduro, after the Venezuelan parliamentary election that year, which he considered fraudulent. The following day López met with Colombian President Iván Duque, and on 11 December he travelled to Cúcuta to meet Venezuelan migrants living in the border and learn about their problems. On 22 May 2021, having travelled to Ecuador, López met with the mayor of Guayaquil, Cynthia Viteri, to discuss about the regularization of the Venezuelan diaspora and to recognize both expired Venezuelan passports and other documents. The following day López met with the president of the National Assembly of Ecuador, Guadalupe Llori, who on 24 May would be in charge of inaugurating president elect Guillermo Lasso. He travelled later to Peru, during the Peruvian general election, and on 29 May participated in a political panel with politicians and businesspeople related to right-wing presidential candidate Keiko Fujimori, daughter of Alberto Fujimori, saying that Fujimori represented "freedom" and "democracy" while he characterized her opponent Pedro Castillo as supporting "dictatorship" and "communism". López criticized Castillo for openly declaring that Venezuela was a full democracy and said that he opined about the Peruvian elections because there were a million Venezuelans living in the country, and that their results would affect the region, including Venezuela. On 23 June, after travelling to the United States and meeting with Republican senator Rick Scott, López declared that the United States would not lift sanctions "without significant advances". In December, during the 2021 Chilean presidential election, López met with far-right candidate José Antonio Kast, endorsing him.

Currently, he is the General Secretary of the World Liberty Congress, an organization of former political prisoners from around the world, which champions democratic elections and the respect of electoral outcomes.

== Personal life ==
On 19 April 2007 he married Lilian Tintori. They have three children: Manuela Rafaela, born in 2009; Leopoldo Santiago, born in 2013; and Federica Antonieta, born in 2018. In an interview with Spanish newspaper La Voz de Galicia, the couple said that they conceived Federica Antonieta in jail during a conjugal visit, in a bathroom, where cockroaches crawled around them.

On 31 March 2026, the Spanish Council of Ministers granted him the Spanish nationality.

== Awards and honors ==
- 2007 – Kenyon College Honoris Causa Doctorate Law.
- 2007, 2008 – Premio Transparencia Award, to the most transparent city mayor of Venezuela, granted by the Venezuela branch of Transparency International.
- 2008 – Third place, World Mayor Project, for being a "hands-on mayor as well as a national politician fighting for democratic openness and fairness in Venezuela".
- 2009 – The Most Innovative People Award for Resiliency from the Future Capitals World Summit.
- 2014 – Harvard University Alumni Achievement Award for the support of democracy and transparency in Venezuela.
- 2014 – Foreign Policy listed López in its Leading Global Thinkers of 2014 publication.
- 2015 – National Endowment for Democracy awarded López its Democracy Award in May 2015.
- 2015 – Cádiz Cortes Ibero-American Freedom Prize was awarded "given the unblemished defense of freedom in your community and minimum requirements of the realization of human rights in the same, which has led them to be subject to public rebuke of their government, including the flagrant situation of imprisonment or the cutting of your minimal civil rights".
- 2015 – One of Spain ABC's Ten Faces in the World in 2015.
- 2016 – Courage Award, Geneva Summit for Human Rights and Democracy, shared with Antonio Ledezma, "for inspiring the world with their extraordinary courage in the defense of liberty and universal human rights".
- 2017 – Florida Medal of Freedom awarded by Governor of Florida, Rick Scott.
- 2017 - Sakharov Prize, along with the Venezuelan opposition.
- 2018 – Nominated for the Nobel Peace Prize

== Publications ==
- Leopoldo López, Gustavo Baquero (2017). VENEZUELA ENERGÉTICA: Propuesta para el bienestar y progreso de los venezolanos (La Hoja del Norte) (in Spanish). Cyngular Asesoría 357, C.A. / Editorial Dahbar. ISBN 978-9804250163.

== See also ==
- List of Harvard University politicians
- Political prisoners in Venezuela
