= María Lourdes Afiuni =

Venezuelan judge (born 1963)

María Lourdes Afiuni Mora (born 8 June 1963) is a Venezuelan judge. She was head of the 31st Control Court of Caracas before she was arrested in 2009 on charges of corruption after ordering the conditional release on bail of businessman Eligio Cedeño, who then fled the country. She was moved to house arrest in Caracas in February 2011, and granted parole in June 2013, but she is still barred from practicing law, leaving the country, or using her bank account or social networks.

Human rights groups accused the late Venezuelan President Hugo Chávez of creating a climate of fear that threatens the independence of the judiciary. Reuters said Afiuni is "considered by opponents and jurists as one of the most emblematic political prisoners" in Venezuela, because Chávez called for her to be imprisoned.

In March 2019, she was sentenced to 5 years in prison. She was sentenced for corruption, although no alleged amounts involved were specified; the actual sentence was for "spiritual corruption". In July 2019, the United Nations High Commissioner for Human Rights, Michelle Bachelet, announced that the Venezuelan government had released Afiuni, along with journalist Braulio Jatar and 20 detained students. Afiuni's brother and Jatar denounced that they had not received an official statement from Venezuelan judiciary.

Afiuni's detention is considered as a landmark case of the erosion of judicial independence during the Bolivarian Revolution.

== Arrest ==
Judge Afiuni was arrested by intelligence officers after ordering the conditional release of businessman Eligio Cedeño on 10 December 2009 pending his trial for evading currency controls. According to the United Nations, she was "charged with corruption, accessory to an escape, criminal conspiracy and abuse of power", and was "denied a public defender". A "pro-Chavez congressman" stated that a bribe was paid to Afiuni; an allegation she denies.

Afiuni said she was following United Nations' guidance when she released Cedeño, who had been detained longer than the time allowed under Venezuelan law. Cedeño had been held in pre-trial detention for three years, although Venezuelan law prescribes a two-year maximum. The pretrial detention process had been repeatedly delayed because prosecutors failed to appear at hearings. Cedeño states that "my trial was improperly suspended in 2008, when a jury was poised to acquit me after a trial which lasted more than two months", and that Afiuni's decision was rendered "in the presence of two representatives from the Attorney General's Office". He also says, "In light of the opinion of the U.N. Working Group, and given the unexcused absence of the prosecutors and the lack of objection by the other government representatives who were present, Control Judge Afiuni granted my conditional release ..."

== First detention ==
Afiuni was incarcerated on 17 December 2009 at the National Institute of Feminine Orientation (INOF), a women's prison on the outskirts of Caracas. Her cell was close to convicts whom she sentenced to jail, and she reported that she was threatened. Responding to concerns that Lourdes Afiuni's life was in danger, Venezuelan authorities reported on 29 December 2009 that she was held separately from the general prison population.

In January 2010, the prosecution filed official charges against Afiuni for alleged irregularities in the release of Eligio Cedeño.

A hearing on Afiuni's case had been postponed several times as of April 2010. In February 2011, she was granted house arrest during recuperation after emergency surgery for cancer.

Afiuni denounced physical abuse and that she was sexually assaulted during her detention. According to her attorney she became pregnant and had an abortion after being raped while in prison.

== Reaction ==
President Hugo Chávez applauded her arrest and said she should be put away in prison for 30 years, the maximum prison sentence in Venezuela. The Caracas Bar Association asserts that the judge's decision to free Cedeño was legal, while the government says it was improper to release him without prosecutors present at the hearing.

Several international groups have expressed concern about the arrest of Judge Afiuni. In December 2009, three independent human rights experts of the United Nations' (UN) Working Group on Arbitrary Detention called for Judge Afiuni's immediate and unconditional release; they said, "Reprisals for exercising their constitutionally guaranteed functions and creating a climate of fear among the judiciary and lawyers' profession serve no purpose except to undermine the rule of law and obstruct justice". In January 2010, the Inter-American Commission on Human Rights issued a protective measure in favor of Maria Lourdes Afiuni. Other groups speaking out against the government's arrest of Judge Afiuni include the Episcopal Conference of Venezuela, Human Rights Watch, the U.S. Department of State, and the Law Society of England and Wales. A director of Human Rights Watch said, "Once again the Chávez government has demonstrated its fundamental disregard for the principle of judicial independence." The Human Rights Foundation has circulated a petition calling for Afiuni's immediate release. "Afuini's is an open and shut case that exposes the despotic nature of the Chávez regime like few others," said HRF president Thor Halvorssen. "Judge Afiuni has withstood years of vitriol by a subservient supreme court and scores of judges that fear something similar will happen to them if they dare to let her go."

On 8 July 2010, the European Parliament stated that it "Condemns the public statements made by the President of the Republic of Venezuela, insulting and denigrating the judge, demanding a maximum sentence and requesting a modification of the law to enable a more severe penalty to be imposed; considers that these statements are aggravating the circumstances of her detention and constitute an attack on the independence of the judiciary by the President of a nation, who should be its first guarantor."

In July 2011, Noam Chomsky—who according to The Observer "Chávez has long considered ... one of his best friends in the west"—published an open letter asking the government of Venezuela for "a humanitarian act that ends the judge's detention". Chomsky stated, "I am convinced that she must be set free, not only due to her physical and psychological health conditions, but in conformance with the human dignity the Bolivarian revolution presents as a goal. In times of worldwide cries for freedom, the detention of María Lourdes Afiuni stands out as a glaring exception that should be remedied quickly, for the sake of justice and human rights generally and for affirming an honourable role for Venezuela in these struggles."

== Release ==
Afiuni was released on June 14, 2013 but remained on trial. In addition, the prosecutor asked the court to require her to report to the authorities every 15 days and to bar her from leaving the country and speaking to the news media.

On July 1, 2015, Afiuni resolved to enter the hearing following the remarks made on June 29, 2015 by Venezuela's Attorney General Luisa Ortega Díaz in Geneva. There, Ortega Díaz denied the existence of any complaint for sexual abuse and torture involving Afiuni.

According to one of her lawyers, Afiuni explained to the court "how the INOF guards and officials of the Ministry of Justice sexually abused her and destroyed her vagina, anus and bladder." and that "the evidence of ill treatment, torture and sexual abuse against Afiuni is contained in the case file and at the United Nations; for this reason, experts, rapporteurs and commissioners of international organizations have issued so many statements in relation to the case. It is not that they are biased, as hinted and said by Luisa Ortega Díaz. It is just that all the evidence confirms all that happened to Afiuni".

== Second detention ==
In March 2019, she was sentenced to five years in prison. She was sentenced for corruption, although no alleged amounts involved were specified; the actual sentence was for "spiritual corruption". In July 2019, the United Nations High Commissioner for Human Rights, Michelle Bachelet, announced that Venezuelan government released Afiuni alongside journalist Braulio Jatar and 20 detained students. Afiuni's brother and Jatar denounced that they had not received an official statement from Venezuelan judiciary.

== See also ==
- Political prisoners in Venezuela
- Ralenis Tovar
- Judicial independence
- Torture in Venezuela
