= Timeline of protests in Venezuela in 2018 =

2018 protests in Venezuela began in the first days of January as a result of high levels of hunger by desperate Venezuelans. Within the first two weeks of the year, hundreds of protests and looting incidents occurred throughout the country. By late-February, protests against the Venezuelan presidential elections occurred after several opposition leaders were banned from participating. Into March, the Maduro government began to crack down on military dissent, arresting dozens of high-ranking officials including former SEBIN director Miguel Rodríguez Torres.

The NGO Venezuelan Observatory of Social Conflict (OVCS) reported that there were 12,715 registered protests in Venezuela in 2018.

== January ==
- 1 January – President Maduro announces a 40% raise in the minimum wage due to hyperinflation.
- 3 January – A soldier in the National Guard is arrested for shooting a pregnant woman dead.
- 9 January – After failed talks with President Maduro, the opposition have looked to the military to oust him from power.
- 10 January – Four bystanders are killed during food riots in Mérida. Food trucks were looted while cattle in nearby farms were stolen and butchered by hungry Venezuelans.
- 11 January – Within the first eleven days of 2018, 107 looting incidents occurred in 19 states while 386 protests happened.
- 12 January – Further looting occurs throughout Venezuela resulting in multiple armored National Guard units being deployed.
- 13 January – Residents of Caracas near Avenida Fuerzas Armadas blocked traffic in protest after they had lost electricity in their homes.
- 14 January – Over 22 stores are looted in Calabozo, Guarico due to the lack of access to food and services.
- 15 January – Oscar Pérez, rebel helicopter pilot was cornered by government forces and he was killed in the siege by military and paramilitary forces. Neighbors in El Junquito on the outskirts of Caracas blocked traffic in protest after the siege.

== February ==
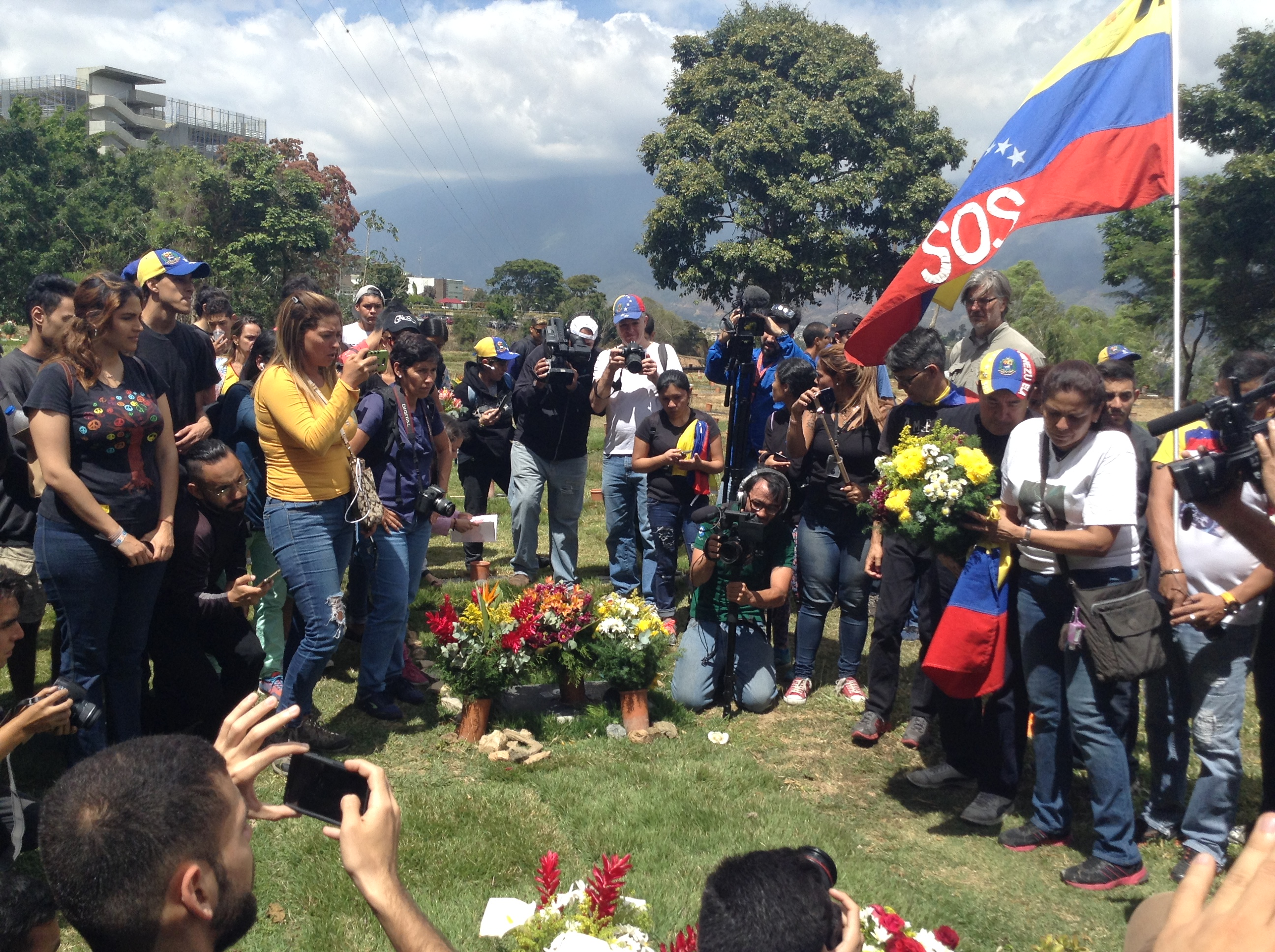
Demonstrators gather at the East Cemetery during the United for Life march on 12 February 2018

- 7 February – Diplomatic talks mediated by the Dominican Republic between the opposition and Bolivarian government are suspended "indefinitely".
- 12 February – Members of the Student Movement led the United for Life march on the fourth anniversary of the beginning of protests, with Venezuelans marching dressed in black in respect and memory of those who were killed during the protests. The destination of the march was the Eastern Cemetery of Caracas where protesters placed flowers at the graves of those had died during demonstrations, including rebel leader Óscar Pérez.
- 14 February – Cardinal Baltazar Porras Cardozo calls for the Venezuelan people "with serenity and firmness, to mobilize to express what the international community has told us, that the convocation of presidential elections is illegitimate".
- 23 February – Residents of 23 de Enero block access to the area while protesting against the lack of access to water for more than ten days.

== March ==
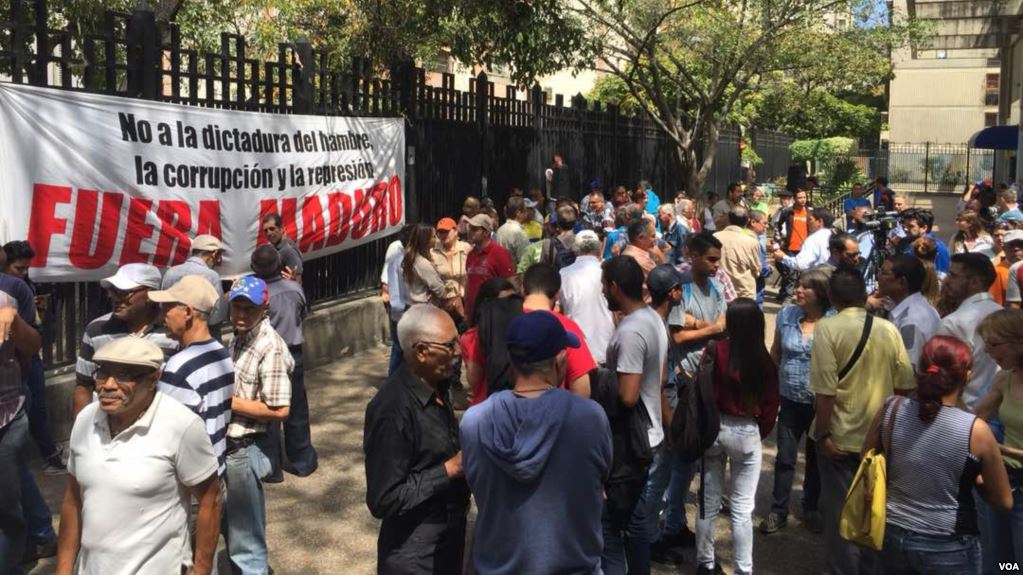
An opposition citizen's assembly held on 17 March 2018

- 8 March – Members of the opposition gathered during the newly created Frente Amplio Venezuela Libre's meeting to announce national street protests to be held on 17 March 2018 to demonstrate against the controversial 2018 presidential elections.
- 11 March – After facing several days of electrical issues, residents of Trujillo, Trujillo began to protest and loot stores after the entire city finally succumbed to a power outage, with looting occurring throughout the night into 12 March.
- 12 March – Frente Amplio Venezuela Libre lead a rally outside of the United Nations headquarters in Venezuela, with former-chavista minister Miguel Rodríguez Torres reading a document drafter by the opposition group demanding the intergovernmental body to ignore the upcoming presidential elections and to instead focus on human rights concerns in the country.
- 13 March – Former-chavista minister and general Miguel Rodríguez Torres, who had spoken the previous day at an opposition rally, is arrested by SEBIN agents and brought to the Dirección General de Contrainteligencia Militar headquarters in Sucre, Miranda.
- 17 March – The opposition's Frente Amplio Venezuela Libre movement holds assemblies in the 335 municipalities of Venezuela, gathering citizens do discuss a way out of the crisis, though some meetings showed little turnout.
- 26 March – Residents of El Valle protest for food after a truck promised by President Maduro to be carrying food to the area never arrived.
- 31 March – At least 728 protests were recorded in the month of March, with the majority denouncing the lack of services and food.

== April ==
- 4 April – At the JM de los Rios Children's Hospital in Caracas, dozens of Venezuelan children suffering from cancer protested due to the lack of attention and medicine that they suffer from.
- 9 April – Dozens of Venezuelans suffering from Parkinson's disease protested in Plaza Altamira against the government after promised medicine had not arrived for over six months.
- 18 April – In Caracas, the Bolivarian National Police was deployed to disperse Venezuelans effected by HIV that were protesting for pharmaceutical and medical care from the government at the headquarters of the health ministry.
- 19 April – Throughout the country, Venezuelans placed banners in public areas calling for President Maduro to resign the presidency.
- 26 April – Residents of La Pastora, a neighborhood located near the president's Miraflores Palace, spontaneously protested during the evening after they had been denied water in their homes once more after numerous months of complaints. The protests stunned security at the palace who observed individuals climbing the fences, with authorities demanding demonstrators to move further away, but the crowds refused. Water was quickly rerouted to the neighborhood which successfully eased the concerns of protesters, though numerous complaints of water shortages in other areas of Caracas remained ignored by the government.

== May ==
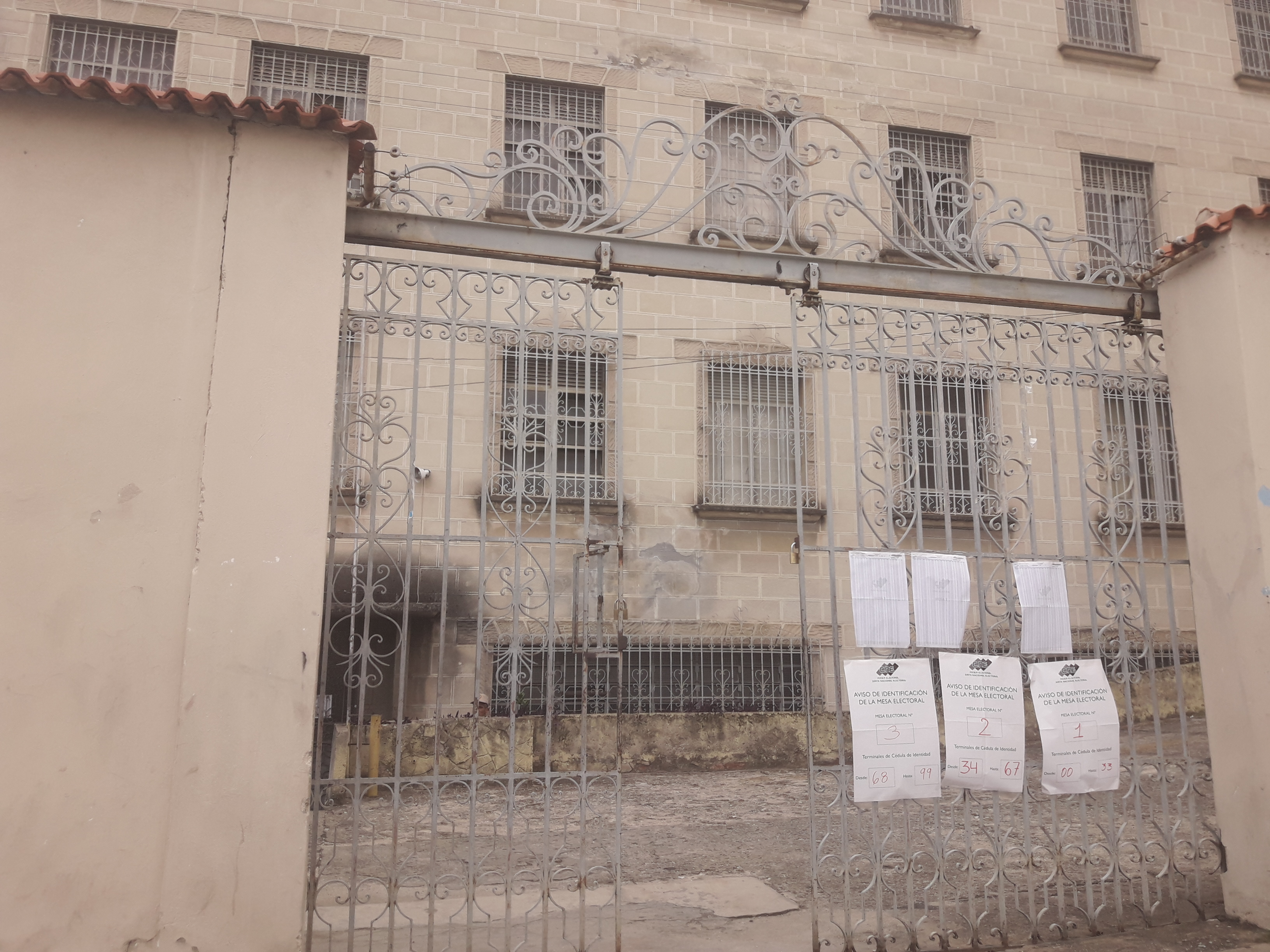
- Election centers during the 2018 presidential election saw low turnout due to protest
  15 May – During a National Assembly session, reporters and deputies were attacked by National Guardsmen who denied journalists entry into the Palacio Federal Legislativo, with the National Guard assaulting and destroying belongings of individuals belonging to the media and National Assembly.
- 16 May – A prison riot occurs in El Helicoide, with several political prisoners arrested during the protests facing danger as Venezuelan authorities fired tear gas and buckshot at individuals in the area.
- 20 May – Following the announcement that President Maduro was reelected in the presidential election, citizens of Caracas began a cacerolazo and some individuals began to barricade streets in protest. Voter turnout was the lowest in Venezuela's modern history after the opposition boycotted the election out of protest.
- 21 May – Venezuelans across the country participated in small protests against the election results, with the largest demonstration organized by Soy Venezuela occurring near the Generalissimo Francisco de Miranda Air Base.
- 28 May – In Isla Margarita, Nueva Esparta, clashes between student protesters and the National Guard results in seven arrests and a fire at the Universidad de Oriente Nueva Esparta after a tear gas canister entered a building.

== June ==
- 1 June – Political prisoners Daniel Ceballos and General Ángel Vivas were released from El Helicoide alongside over 30 other prisoners, though many of those released belonged to colectivos which attacked Henri Falcón's campaign manager.

== July ==
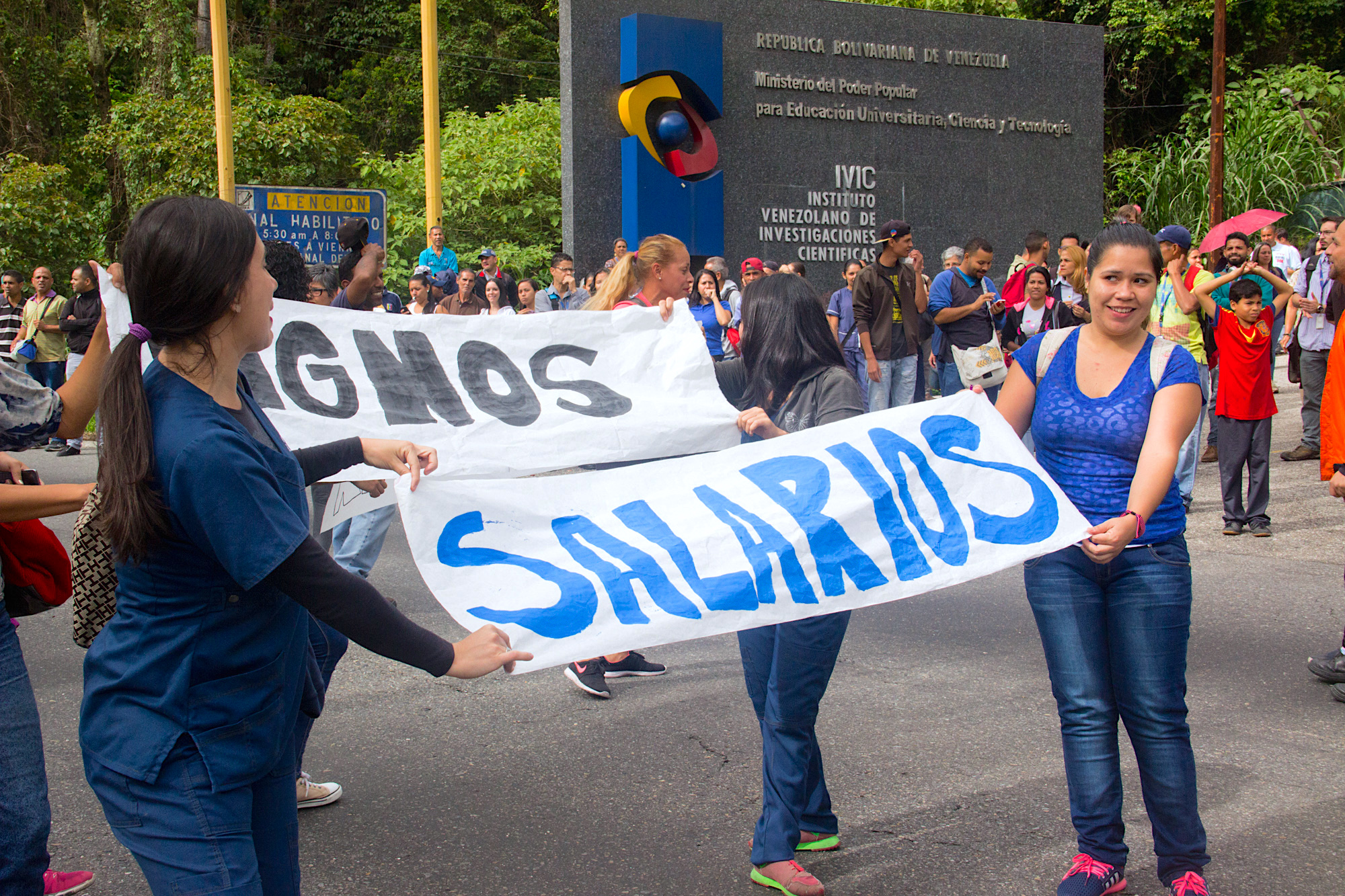
- Nurses protesting for a fair salary
  2 July – The Supreme Tribunal of Justice in exile, based in Panama, makes a ruling that Nicolás Maduro was no longer the legitimate President of Venezuela and called for the opposition-led National Assembly of Venezuela to appoint a new President of Venezuela. The ruling was supported by Secretary General of the Organization of American States Luis Almagro.
- 3 July – Lilian Tintori and other activists are quickly turned away from a planned protest after a large group of colectivos confronted the demonstration.
- 7 July –Rioting inside El Helicoide begins once again after plans to retaliate against mistreatment in the prison.
- 9 July – Health workers who had joined the Association of Nurses of Caracas stated that they would march to Miraflores Palace on 12 July 2018 if the Minister of Health Carlos Alvarado ignored their call for a meeting. The association had been holding protests throughout Caracas demanding better conditions for their patients and for a better living wage that had been affected by hyperinflation in Venezuela.
- 18 July – Protests organized by Venezuelan unions demanding adequate pay amid hyperinflation intensify. Elderly individuals demanding the payment of their pensions in Fuerza Armadas, Caracas were approached by colectivos, though the protesters drove away the would-be intimidators.
- 30 July – Opposition leader Henrique Capriles states that talks about mobilizing an anti-government movement were progressing and that efforts were underway to unify nurses, teachers and other Venezuelan groups, explaining that the groups needed to mobilize now or else the Venezuelan opposition would "disappear".

== August ==
- 4 August – At 5:40 p.m drones exploded while Venezuelan President Nicolás Maduro was giving a speech on Avenida Bolívar during a military parade.
- 16 August – A march led by nurses, who had been protesting for 53 consecutive days, was destined to arrive at the president's Miraflores Palace, though it was blocked by hundreds of authorities. However, after being without electricity for more than 36 hours, residents of the Altagracia parish living near Miraflores Palace protested outside the palace's gates and were quickly dispersed by the National Guard, who fired tear gas and pellets at protesters.
- 19 August – Representatives of Justice First, Popular Will and Radical Cause call for Venezuelans to participate in a general strike on 21 August 2018.

== September ==
- 1 September – Elderly pensioners protest throughout Venezuela, demanding payment from the government.

== November ==
- 28 November – Citizens demanding a living wage planned to march to Miraflores Palace but were dispersed by members of the National Guard and National Police.

== See also ==
- Protests against Nicolás Maduro
- Timeline of the 2014 Venezuelan protests
- Timeline of the 2015 Venezuelan protests
- Timeline of the 2016 Venezuelan protests
- Timeline of the 2017 Venezuelan protests
- Timeline of the 2019 Venezuelan protests
