= Timeline of protests in Venezuela in 2016 =

2016 protests in Venezuela began in early January following controversy surrounding the 2015 Venezuelan parliamentary elections and the increasing hardships felt by Venezuelans. The series of protests originally began in February 2014 when hundreds of thousands of Venezuelans protested due to high levels of criminal violence, inflation, and chronic scarcity of basic goods because of policies created by the Venezuelan government though the size of protests had decreased since 2014.

In the first two months of 2016, over 1,000 protests and dozens of looting incidents were recorded throughout Venezuela. Much of the looting occurred due to shortages in Venezuela with Venezuelans forced to stand in the sun for hours while waiting in line for scarce products. By September, Venezuela saw some of its largest protests in the country's history with over one million demonstrating on 1 September 2016 and 26 October 2016. Into November, protests ceased due to the Vatican-backed dialogue between the opposition and the Bolivarian government, though the talks began to fall apart by the end of December. The protests are listed below according to the month they had happened.

== January ==
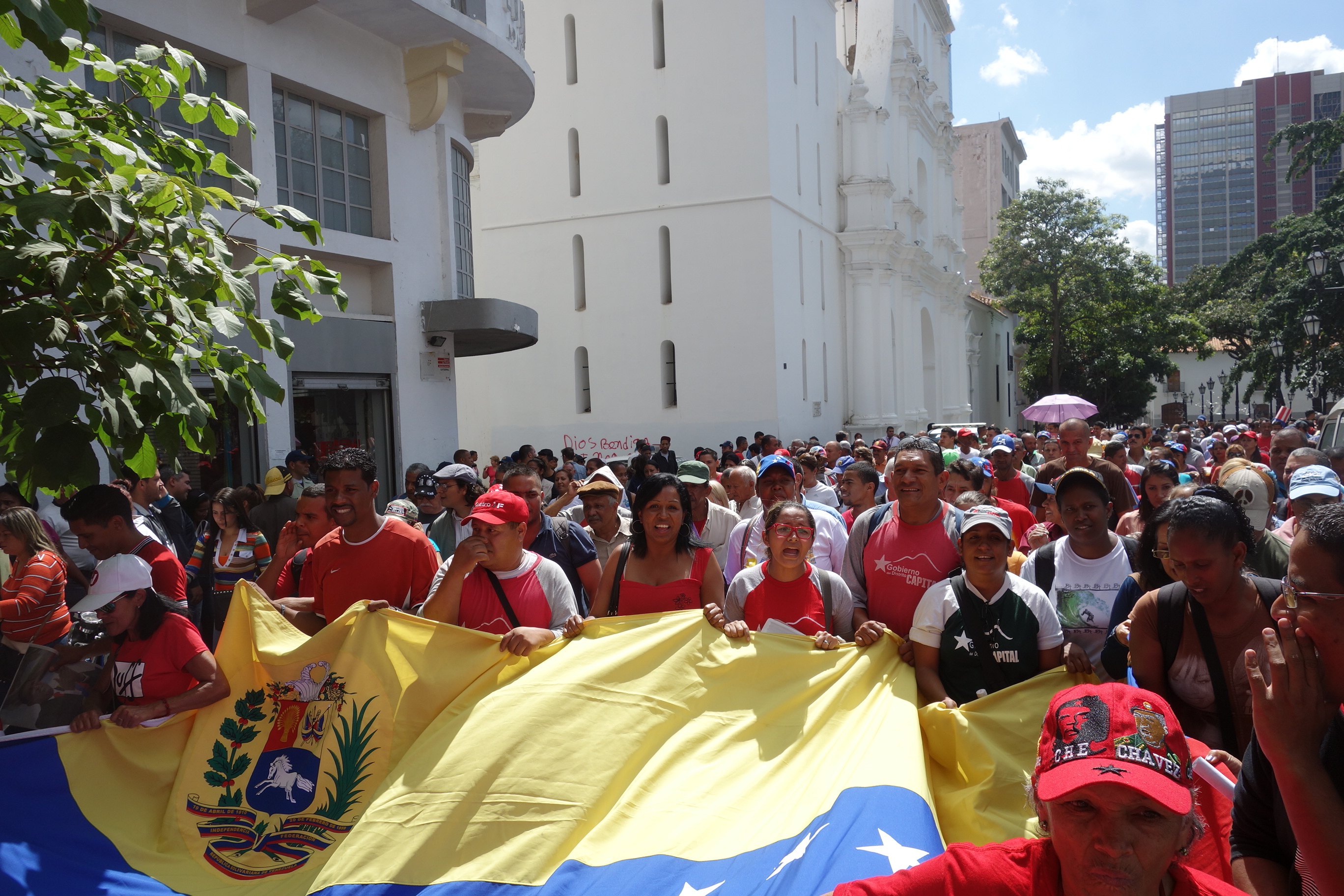
Chavistas protesting the removal of Chávez and Bolivar images from the National Assembly on 7 January 2016.

- 5 January – After their success in the 2015 Venezuelan parliamentary election, opposition lawmakers were sworn into office obtaining a majority status while Bolivarian lawmakers walked out in protest shouting demeaning statements at the opposition as they left. With journalists granted to enter the National Assembly building for the first time in years, chanting and scuffles were reported and captured on camera. Outside of the building, hundreds of opposition supporters gathered while a larger crowd of government supporters gathered outside of Miraflores Palace denouncing the newly elected opposition parliament.
- 7 January – After the opposition-led National Assembly removed images of Hugo Chávez and Simón Bolívar, two symbols of the Bolivarian Revolution, from the National Assembly building, the Bolivarian government called for protests and to place the image of Chávez "on every street corner", with President Maduro ordering all members of the military to place images of both Hugo Chávez and Simón Bolivar in their homes.
- 13 January – Early in the day, three opposition lawmakers led protests outside of the Supreme Tribunal of Justice building after the lame duck parliament stacked the court with pro-government judges in December which blocked an opposition supermajority in the parliament. While lawmakers were entering the National Assembly building, government supporters threw tomatoes and fireworks at them. With no choice but to agree with the government-stacked Supreme Tribunal of Justice that threatened to make laws passed by the National Assembly invalid unless three opposition lawmakers under investigation were not sworn in, the opposition-led National Assembly accepted the terms and allowed the three lawmakers to leave the parliament.

== March ==
- 10 March - Violence erupts in San Cristóbal between students and riot police after a by the supreme court ruling blocked the power of the opposition-controlled National Assembly to review government appointments of the court's justices.
- 13 March – The opposition launches renewed protests calling for President Maduro's removal from office. Thousands of Venezuelans protest either supporting or denouncing Maduro's government.
- 27 March - A poll shows that two thirds of Venezuelans want Maduro's presidency to end this year and referendum results would be expected to show 52% wanting him removed from office.
- 29 March – During a protest surrounding increased bus fares in San Cristobal, two policeman were killed while another four were injured when a bus driven by protesters struck the officers.
- 30 March - The opposition-controlled National Assembly passes an amnesty bill to free over 70 opposition leaders incarcerated during the protests. President Maduro vows to veto this bill but the opposition can overturn it due to their control over the National Assembly. However, Maduro can pass this to the Supreme Tribunal. The opposition also plans a referendum to have Maduro removed from office.
- 31 March - The National Assembly passes a legislation to make it easier for pensioners and retirees to pay for food and medicine in response to the rapid inflation.

== April ==
- 25 April - The supreme court rules that the opposition's proposed amendment to shorten the presidential term limit from 6 to 4 years cannot be applied retroactively, ending any attempt to shorten Maduro's rule.
- 26 April – Opposition obtains documents to proceed with a referendum against President Maduro.
- 27 April – With 2 of 3 Venezuelans wanting President Maduro removed from office, Venezuelans begin signing documents to recall Maduro as the opposition holds a rally for signatures. Blackouts and other issues surrounding the Bolivarian government results in looting with over 100 arrested in Maracaibo.
- 29 April – During a protest against shortages of electricity in Caracas, opposition leader Jesús Torrealba was attack by government supporters.

== May ==
- 2 May – Just days after being granted documents to begin an effort to recall President Maduro, Venezuela's unified opposition delivered petitions with what it said were 1.8 million signatures, over 9 times the 200,000 necessary signatures needed to begin the next phase of the recall procedure.
- 11 May – Over 5,000 desperate Venezuelans looted a Maracay market for food. The incident resulted in two deaths, several injuries and millions of dollars in damage.
- 18 May – Thousands of Venezuelans protest outside of the CNE electoral body in Caracas demanding a recall of President Maduro.

== June ==
- 9 June – During a protest which opposition lawmakers attended denouncing what they called the poor performance of Venezuela's electoral body, members of the National Guard stationed outside of the electoral offices pushed protesters toward a pro-government group of colectivos who attacked protesters, with one lawmaker, Julio Borges, being hit by a pipe in the face. In Petare, Miranda, looting and protests occurred with multiple people shot by Venezuelan authorities, with 21 year-old Jose Antonio Tovar being killed in the gunfire.
- 12 June – In Cerezal, Sucre, protests occurred with about 10 people were injured from buckshot and gunfire fired by the National Guard, while 21 year-old Luis Fuentes Josmel being killed.
- 14 June – In Cumaná, one of the largest instances of protests and looting due to the lack of food occurred with dozens of shops looted and at least three people killed, with reports of government authorities participating in the looting as well.
- 20 June - Citizens across the country begin queuing up for fingerprint vandalism of 1,850,000 signatures on a referendum to recall President Maduro.

== August ==
- 22 August – Capriles Radonski announces a march called the "Toma de Caracas" (Taking of Caracas) to be held on 1 September, with a goal to mobilize opposition supporters nationwide and to place pressure on the CNE to give answers about the referendum.

== September ==
- 1 September – Opposition protesters marched to Caracas on a national level in the Taking of Caracas to push for the recall referendum of Maduro. Chúo Torrealba called for a cacerolazo the same night.
- 2 September – People from Villa Rosa, Nueva Esparta state, received Maduro with a cacerolazo while he was inaugurating houses of the Gran Misión Barrio Nuevo, Barrio Tricolor.
- 3 September – At least 30 persons were detained by the SEBIN after the cacerolazo in Villa Rosa.

== October ==
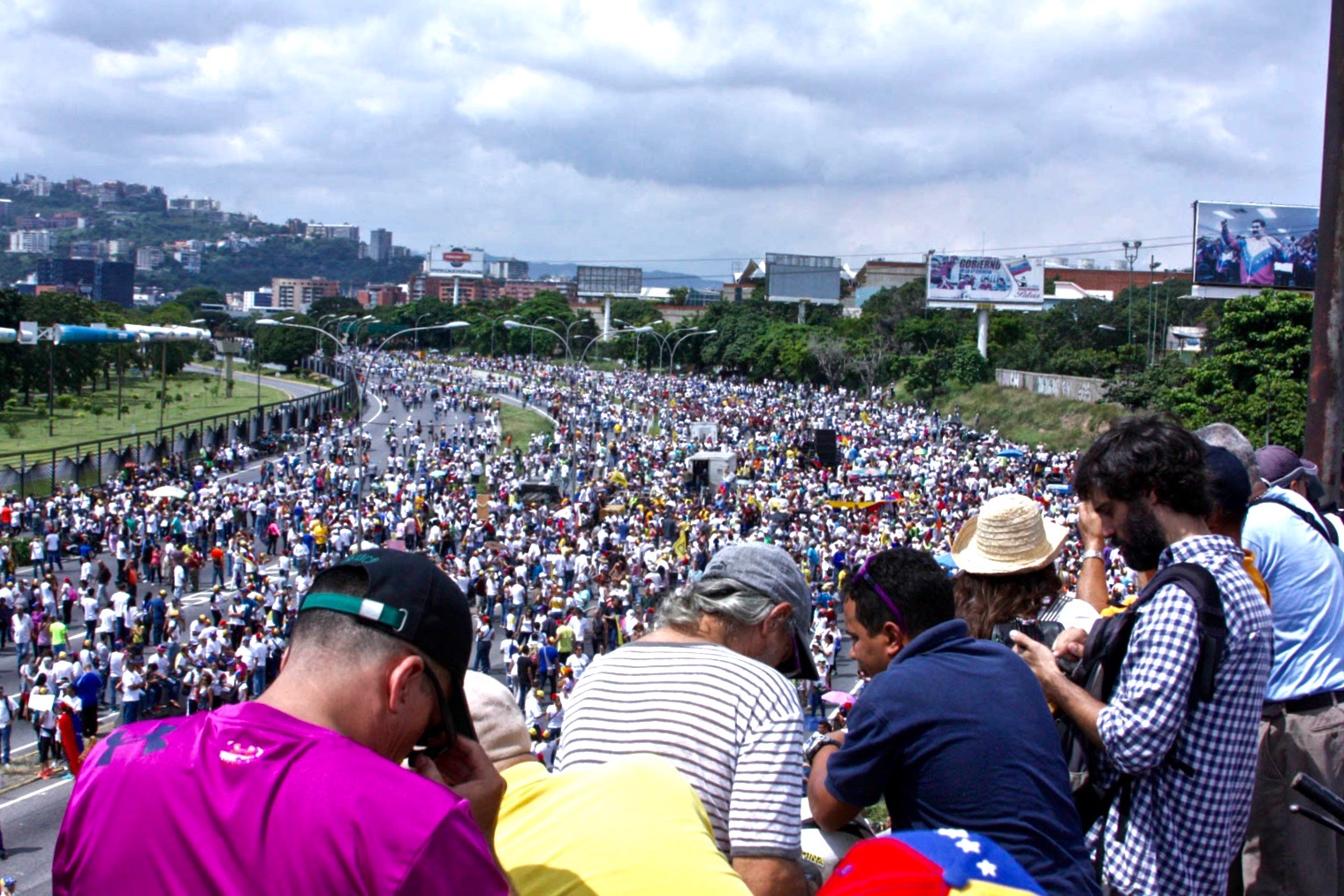
26 October 2016 protest that gathered an estimated 1.2 million Venezuelans.

- 21 October –The CNE suspends the referendum only days before preliminary elections were to be held. The CNE blamed alleged voter fraud as the reason for the cancellation of the referendum. Opposition leaders responded by calling for protests on 26 October against the CNE's actions.
- 22 October –Several thousands Venezuelans march through Caracas protesting against the suspension of the recall referendum. Demonstrators were led by Lilian Tintori and Patricia Gutierrez, wives of arrested opposition politicians.
- 23 October –The opposition-led National Assembly gathers declaring that "there had been a breakdown of constitutional order and a continued state of coup led from the highest level of government by President Nicolas Maduro". Government supporters storm the National Assembly, stealing phones and assaulting opposition lawmakers while also vandalizing the building.
- 24 October –Students nationwide stage protests, with hundreds of students from San Cristobal, Caracas and Valencia taking to the streets to demonstrate with clashes reported in San Cristobal where National Guardsmen fired rubber bullets at students. Henrique Capriles Radonski announces the starting areas and routes of the "Toma de Venezuela" ("Taking of Venezuela") protests destined for 26 October.
- 25 October –The National Assembly votes for President Maduro to face questioning on 1 November for possible impeachment proceedings through the government-supporting Supreme Court.
- 26 October –Foreign journalists are prevented from entering Venezuela before the day's protests. It is estimated that 1.2 million Venezuelans protested, demanding President Maduro to leave office, with Caracas protests remaining calm while protests in other states resulted in clashes between demonstrators and authorities, leaving 1 policeman dead, 120 injured and 147 arrested. Opposition leaders also called for a 12-hour national strike for 28 October while Henrique Capriles stated, "Today we are giving a deadline to the government. I tell the coward who is in Miraflores ... that on 3 November the Venezuelan people are coming to Caracas because we are going to Miraflores".
- 28 October –The national strike has only partial participation after the Bolivarian government threatens business owners that their companies will be taken over and they will be arrested if any strikes occurred, with reports of military and SEBIN personnel outside of businesses reported.

== November ==
- 1 November –National Assembly President and opposition leader Henry Ramos Allup announced the cancellation of the 3 November march to the Miraflores presidential palace, though some opposition leaders gave the government a deadline of 12 November until new elections should be formed or else they would announce marches to the palace. President Maduro respected the decision to cancel the march toward his palace, calling anyone who organizes marches toward Miraflores a "criminal" and stated that the political party Popular Will was a "outlawed terrorist group", calling for courts to "take action" against them.

== December ==
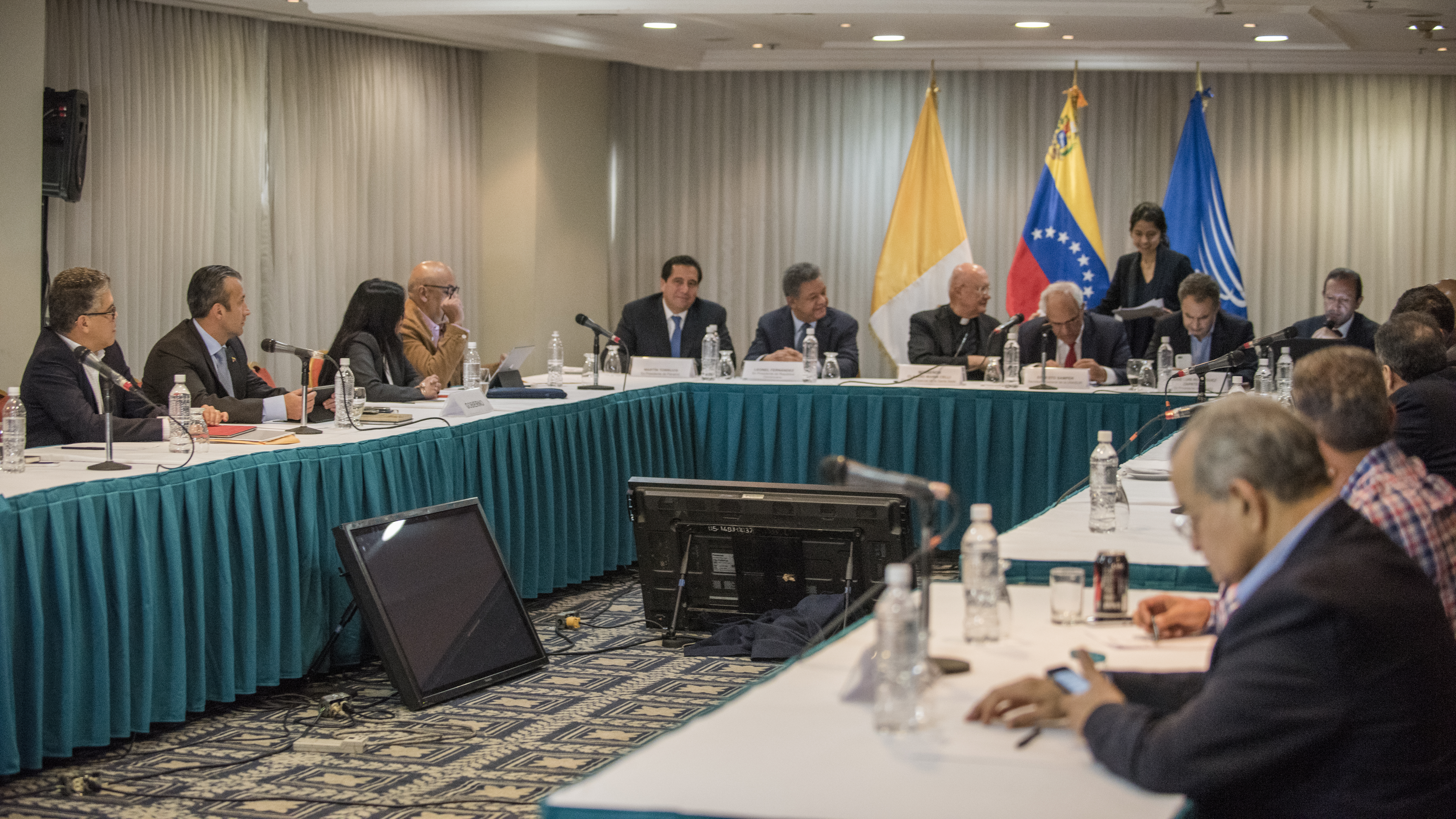
Vatican-backed dialogue with the Bolivarian government

- 7 December – The opposition announces a halt on Vatican-backed dialogue with the Bolivarian government since they would not release political prisoners and hold recall elections. Bolivarian government officials also stated that the talks had halted with the opposition.
- 17 December - In the aftermath of violence triggered by a cash shortage in Venezuela, soldiers patrolled streets, residents erected barricades, and businesses were ransacked in areas most affected. Over the weekend, at least three deaths and 405 arrests were reported following protests and looting sparked by the government's elimination of the largest currency bill. Opposition sources claim 5 were killed. In Ciudad Bolivar, rioters targeted Chinese-owned shops, causing concern in Beijing. President Nicolas Maduro postponed the removal of the 100-bolivar notes, which exacerbated hardships amid food scarcity and soaring inflation, until Jan. 2. The move left many unable to conduct transactions during the Christmas season.
- 26 December – The opposition held a fresh day of mass protests with substantial presence of opposition parties, students, and general public. The city centre of Caracas is overwhelmed by security and extra official forces quickly dissipating the march. Gunshots and conflict is overheard throughout the Capital, putting a shadow over the upcoming New Year.

== March ==
- GENEVA (22 March 2023) - Persistent attacks and widespread repression by the Government of Venezuela against perceived opponents continues to haunt the country’s population, the UN Fact-Finding Mission on Venezuela (FFMV) said in its latest update on the country’s human rights situation today.During a presentation to the Human Rights Council in Geneva, the FFMV detailed how authorities continue to detain civil society actors on political grounds, stifle trade union protests and shut down media outlets. The Fact-Finding Mission also warned that newly proposed legislation, if adopted, would significantly limit the ability of non-governmental organizations to carry out their work.

== See also ==
- Protests against Nicolás Maduro
- Timeline of the 2014 Venezuelan protests
- Timeline of the 2015 Venezuelan protests
- Timeline of the 2017 Venezuelan protests
- Timeline of the 2018 Venezuelan protests
- Timeline of the 2019 Venezuelan protests
