= Timeline of protests in Venezuela in 2015 =

2015 protests in Venezuela began in the first days of January primarily due to shortages in the country, with the first massive demonstration occurring on 23 January, on the anniversary of the 1958 coup d'etat against dictator Marcos Pérez Jiménez. The series of protests originally began in February 2014 when hundreds of thousands of Venezuelans protested due to high levels of criminal violence, inflation, and chronic scarcity of basic goods because of policies created the Venezuelan government. As of January 2015, over 50 people had been arrested for protesting. The protests are listed below according to the month they had happened.

== January ==
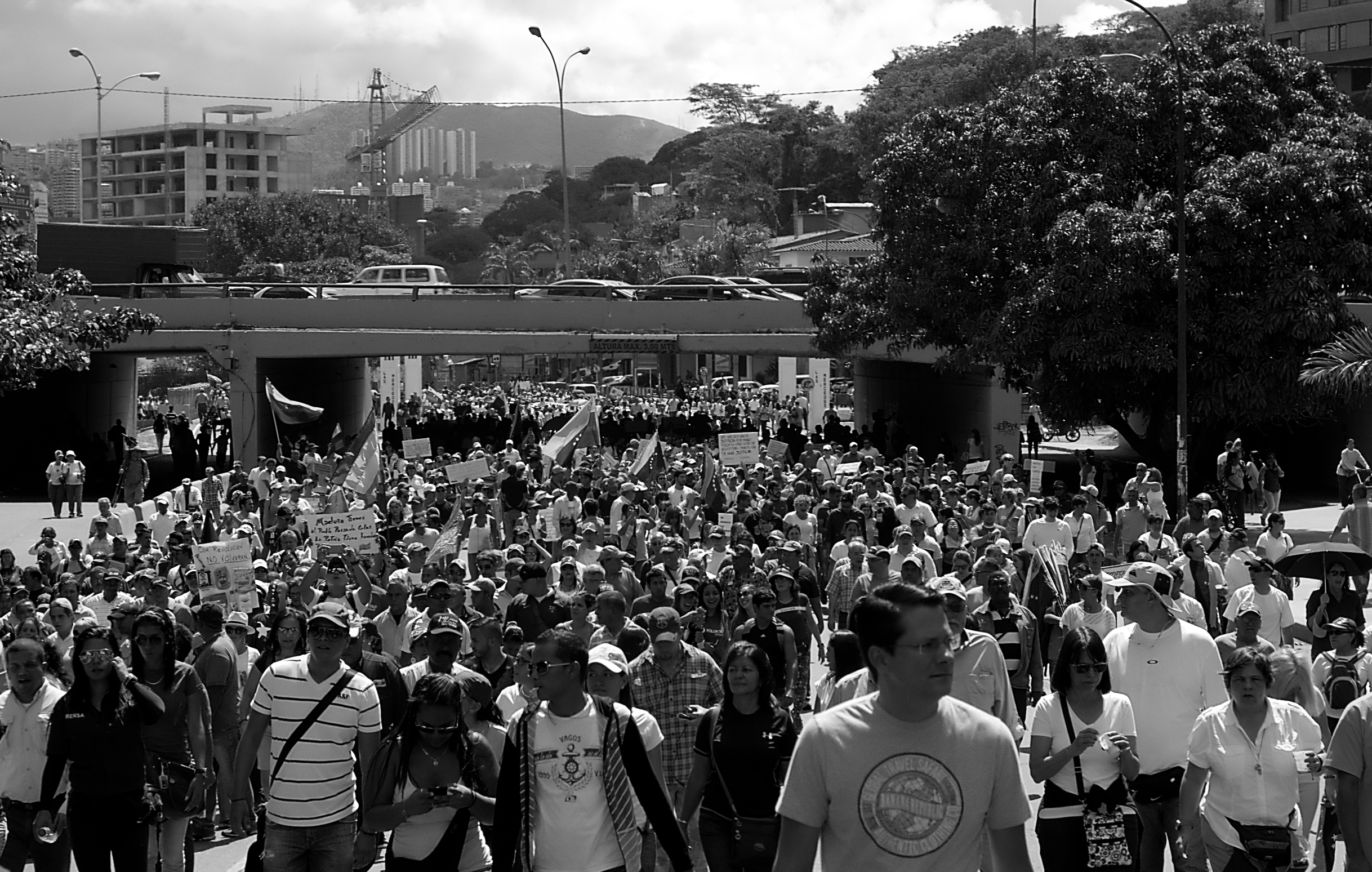
The "March of Empty Pots" in Caracas on 24 January 2015, where several thousand marched against shortages and denounced the Venezuelan government.

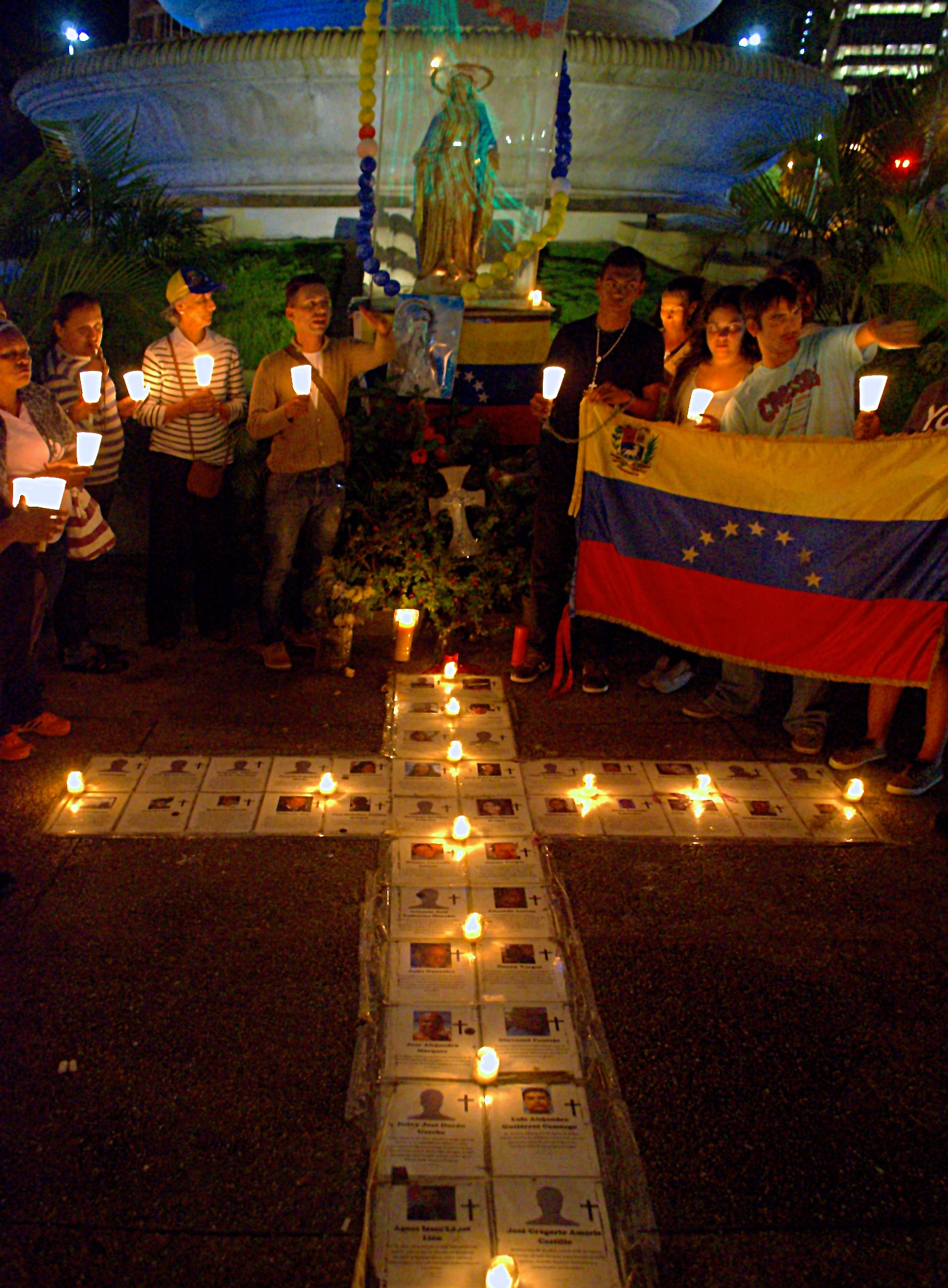
A vigil being held on 5 January 2015 for those killed and imprisoned during the 2014 Venezuelan protests.

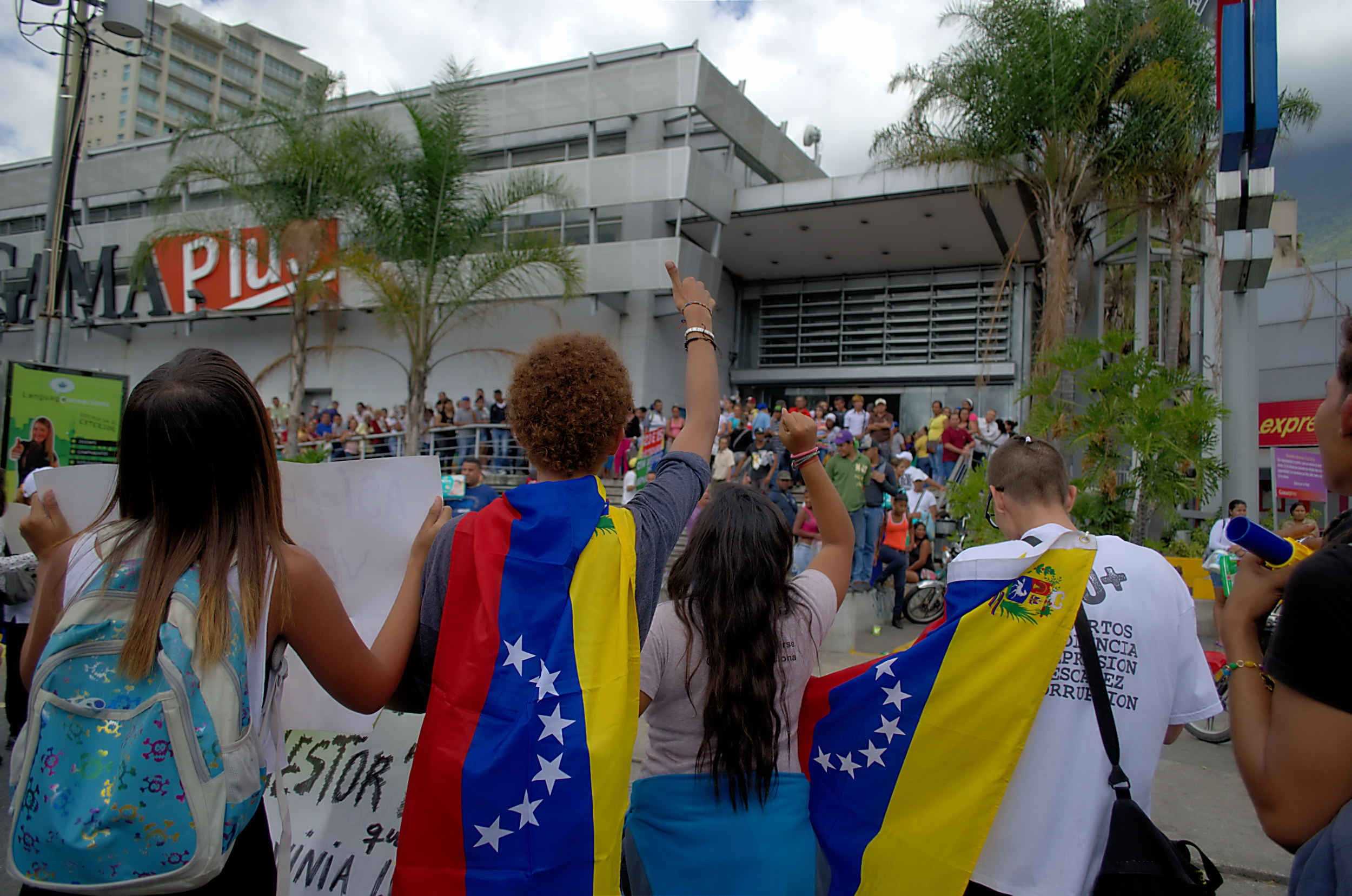
Protesters showing signs and yelling invitations to protest to the people in lines waiting to buy basic goods.

- 1 January – Students who chained themselves together in Plaza Altamira on 18 December 2014 remained chained and demanded the release of arrested protesters and stated that their actions "achieved the objective of generating reflection Venezuelans about the situation of political prisoners in the country." Three people remained chained together in Maracay after three consecutive days stating that they wish to stay at the site for at least six days to "call to the conscience".
- 3 January – Several people began protesting in Los Teques due to the long lines to purchase goods.
- 5 January –Peaceful protests occurred on Francisco Miranda Avenue in Chacao denouncing the poor situation of Venezuela while demanding the release of protesters arrest by the National Guard.
- 6 January – Students held a peaceful protest on Las Delicias Avenue in Maracay to send a message to Venezuela and the international community showing solidarity with arrested protesters while also criticizing the security policies of the Bolivarian government. Protesters demonstrated for a second day on Francisco Miranda Avenue in Chacao addressing the social, economic and political crisis in Venezuela while also asking for the release of those arrested.
- 7 January – Students from the Catholic University of Táchira peacefully protested on the main street of San Cristobal which resulted in 12 arrested, including 4 minors.
- 8 January – For the fourth consecutive day, protests occurred in Chacao with barricades reappearing, which resulted in response from authorities with tear gas. The Pan American Highway was blocked by students in Los Toques causing heavy back ups.
- 9 January – After clashes with protesters, the National Guard and National Police destroyed memorabilia of those injured or killed during the protests. Five individuals were arrested in Chacao for possessing gas masks. Residents of La Candelaria protested due to long lines that mostly last more than 8 hours and shortages in stores.
- 10 January – In Santa Fe, protesters blocked traffic on Prados del Este Highway and attempted to construct a barricade, but were dispersed in about 30 minutes. 5 individuals were arrested in San Bernardino after protesting near a government Bicentennial market.
- 12 January – Opposition leader Henrique Capriles Radonski said it was time for Venezuelans to mobilize following growing shortages and large lines for food in January, but noted that it was "not the time of guarimba". In Naguanagua, protests and authorities clashed with tear gas being fired by the National Guard.
- 13 January – The Catholic University of Táchira suspended classes due to strong protests in the area that left more than 20 students injured. The Democratic Unity Roundtable proposed a possible "mobilization" following a call made by Henrique Capriles due to the "massive violation of human rights" in Venezuela.
- 14 January – Students in Mérida begin to protest against insecurity as well as food and medicine shortages. Students in San Cristobal, Bolívar protested because of nationwide shortages by blocking streets and burning tires.
- 15 January – At the University of Los Andes (ULA) in Tachira, Venezuelan authorities and possibly members of colectivos raided the university firing teargas and buckshot at student protesters. Venezuelan authorities broke down doors to enter facilities and fired at students inside of the buildings. At least 25 students were injured from both lead and plastic pellets fired from Venezuelan authorities at the ULA protest, with the injured students being treated by medical students on campus in order to avoid arrests. In Mérida, students protested once again with horns of passing cars heard showing support.
- 18 January – During the 2015 Vuelta al Táchira circuit, peaceful protesters were confronted by National Guardsmen.
- 19 January – Active and retired teachers protested in Táchira demanding the resignation of regional board and national administrator of the Venezuelan government's Institute for Social Security and Welfare Staff of the Ministry of Education (IPASME) due to what they call proselytizing and propaganda produced by the institution.
- 22 January – In Piar, members of the Chamber of Commerce and Industry protested demanding security from the state government, law enforcement agencies and regional authorities.
- 23 January – Venezuelans across the country gathered with the opposition denouncing inabilities of the Venezuelan government demanding freedom and democracy while commemorating the end of Marcos Pérez Jiménez's dictatorship in Venezuela. Thousands peacefully demonstrated through a march in Mérida, marching over 4 km denouncing Venezuela's economic situation from the University of Los Andes to the Ombudsman's office delivering a document. An hour after the march ended, a separate protest gathered that was confronted by motorcyclists that beat one student and left them shot in the ankle. Clashes also occurred in Mérida between protesters and Venezuelan authorities that resulted in a damaged National Guard vehicle and the use of force on the protesters. The clashes occurred in Mérida after Venezuelan authorities encountered a protest by citizens that was held due to a lack of gas in their homes for nearly 2 weeks. The MUD opposition group called for a nationwide protest called the "March of Empty Pots" for the next day, 24 January.
- 24 January – Several thousand Venezuelans protested in the "March of Empty Pots" in Caracas against the shortages of products and demanded changes in the Venezuelan government. In Zulia, a march was held from the University of Zulia to the Republic Plaza, where speeches by opposition leaders were held. The protests were smaller than the other organized demonstrations in 2014 since Venezuelans feared a government crackdown or were preoccupied with the product shortages in the country.
- 25 January – In Chacao, residents protested in the evening under the watch of Venezuelan authorities.
- 26 January – In Los Teques, students of the College of Los Teques "Cecilio Acosta" (CULTCA) protested which led to the response from the National Guard entering the campus firing tear gas and rubber bullets.
- 27 January – The Government of Venezuela authorizes the use of lethal force as a "last resort" for protests despite a constitutional ban on the use of toxic weapons or use of firearms. In Mérida, 18 students, including multiple minors, were arrested in the evening for allegedly being part of a protest.
- 28 January – At the University Rafael Belloso Chacin (Urbe) in Maracaibo, students who were protesting for the release of other students that had been previously arrested were allegedly confronted by both the National Police and colectivos working together.
- 29 January – After being detained for two days, the 18 students who were arrested in Mérida were released while citizens protested outside of the police station.

== February ==
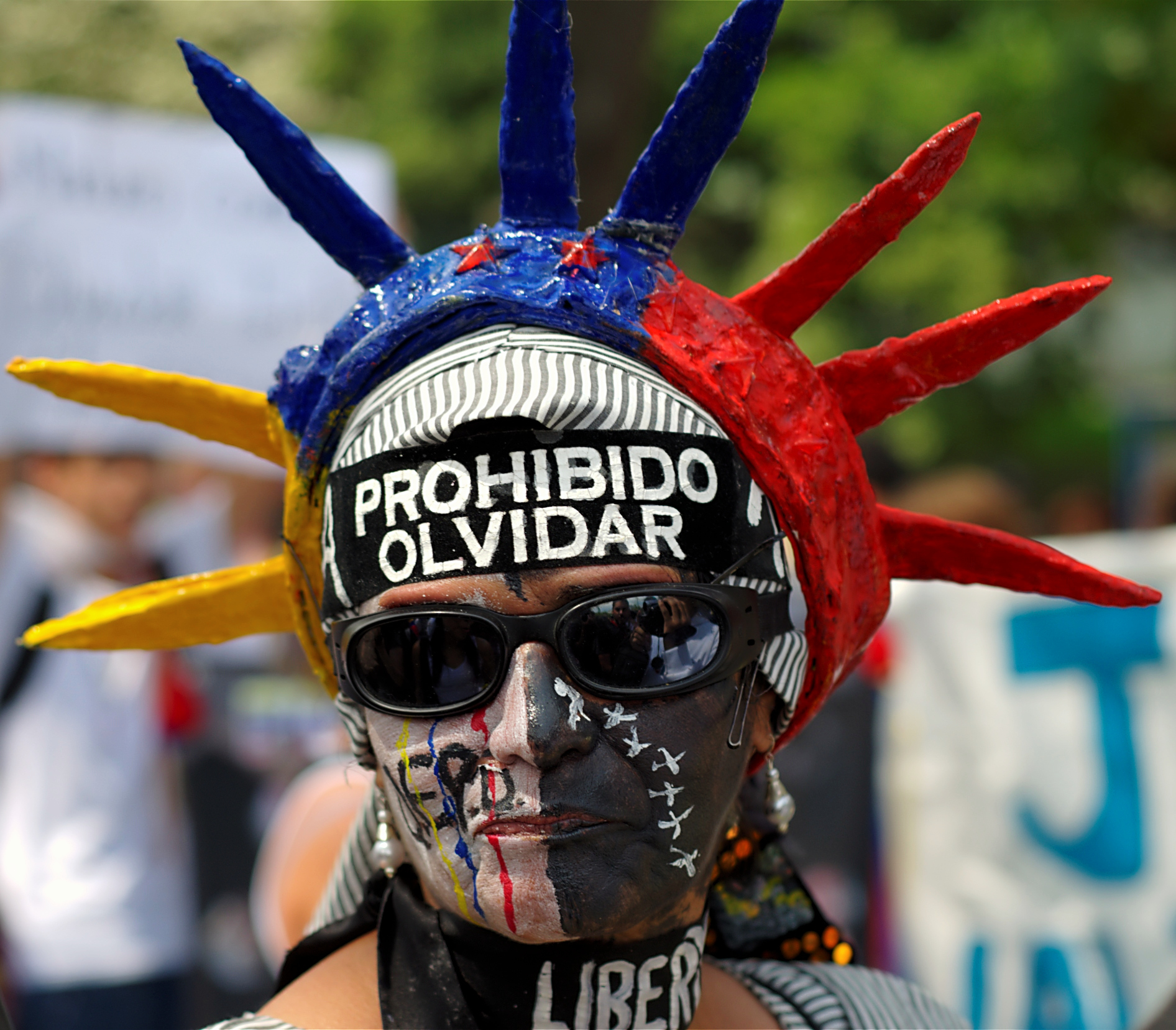
Protester during the rally called by the students on February 12th in Caracas.

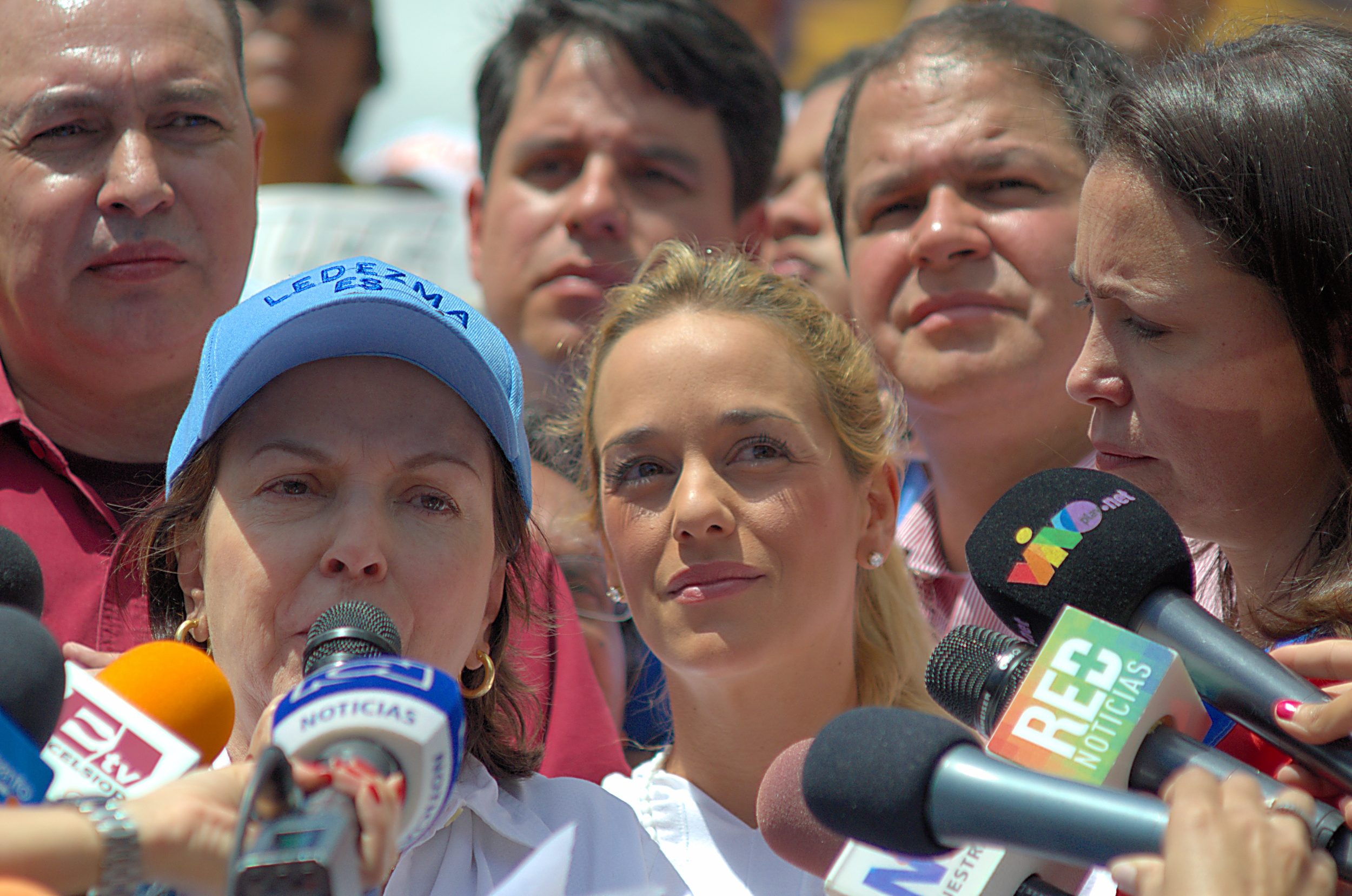
María Corina Machado and Lilian Tintori supporting Mrs. Mitzy Capriles de Ledezma, wife of the Metropolitan Mayor of Caracas at a gathering on 20 February.

- 3 February – Students of the University of Los Andes called for a march to the Public Ministry in Mérida on 12 February, commemorating the deaths of those killed that day one year beforehand and to demand the release of arrested students.
- 4 February – In Mérida, members of the "Liberation Movement" of the University of Los Andes along with residents protested demanding the resignation of President Maduro.
- 7 February – In the La Urbina neighborhood of the Sucre municipality, residents began to protest following the murder of a woman during a robbery, with the citizens demanding better police security while stating that four robberies occurred daily in the area.
- 9 February – Students in San Cristóbal protested demanding a response from PSUV leader and Táchira Governor Jose Vielma Mora who did not respond to a letter delivered to them.
- 10 February – Three protesting students from the Catholic University of Táchira were injured from bullet wounds in San Cristóbal when the National Police fired at them while they were attempting to hide under vehicles from the police gunfire. Bullet holes were found on vehicles and shell casings were gathered, with the Catholic University of Táchira cancelled classes that day following the shooting. The Student Movement of Guyana announced a march for 12 February with the PSUV Student Movement responding to them by announcing a countermarch to confront the protesters at their march destination while also planning to support the National Guard.
- 11 February – Táchira governor José Gregorio Vielma Mora announced that Brigadier General Espinal Alexis Fernandez replaced Johnny Campos as National Police chief following the shooting that occurred the previous day of 3 Catholic University of Táchira students.
- 12 February – In Caracas and San Cristóbal hundreds marched to commemorate the beginning of protests in 2014. Clashes between police and protesters also occurred in both cities leading to injuries and arrests, with protesters throwing rocks and making barricades against police in Caracas and protesters throwing pipes and Molotov cocktails at police after they were confronted during a march in San Cristóbal. Government supporters also held a large demonstration numbered in the thousands in Caracas in support of President Maduro as well as a Youth Day concert in the city in celebration of the holiday.
- 13 February – According to Jose Vielma Mora, the governor of Tachira state and political ally of President Maduro stated that 11 people were arrested during street demonstrations on 12 February where fourteen National Police officers were injured in an attack. A Tachira court had also ordered two police officers suspected of shooting at a student to be held pending formal charges of attempted homicide and unlawful use of their suspected of their service weapons. Protests occurred near Altamira Plaza on Francisco Miranda Avenue where protesters blocked traffic denouncing the arrests and commemorating the deaths of those killed in the 2014 protests.
- 14 February – Two protesters were released and one remained detained following the 12 February protests in San Cristóbal.
- 16 February – The Union of Workers of the Forest Enterprises announced a strike and protest, asking the government to complete promises made by former President Chavez involving upgrades in technology that was not completed that caused a drop in production while also demanding better pay.
- 19 February – Students near the Catholic University of Táchira protested against the government and some were injured by rounds of buckshot fired at them.
- 20 February – In Caracas, demonstrations occurred denouncing the arrest of opposition mayor Antonio Ledezma on actions during the protests of the year before
- 22 February – Clashes occurred between students of the Catholic University of Táchira and Venezuelan authorities after the murders of two students who were bound and shot to death.
- 24 February – The first death of the 2015 protests occurred during protests and clashes near the Catholic University of Táchira in San Cristóbal when Kluiberth Roa Nunez, a 14-year-old high school student, was fatally shot in the head by a National Police officer. According to witnesses, Kluiberth, who had inadvertently come across the confrontation while leaving school, was hit while trying to take shelter under a car as protestors fled the police. One witness said the officer allegedly shot the 14-year-old at point blank range after he fell on the ground. The officer was arrested and President Maduro publicly condemned the killing. According to Venezuelan government officials, 6 authorities were injured when protesters allegedly became violent, with officials stating they made barricades and used Molotov cocktails.
- 25 February – Students demonstrated with school books symbolically covered in fake blood near the headquarters of the Ministry of Interior, Justice and Peace in the Libertador municipality demanding Minister Carmen Melendez Teresa Rivas to investigate the death of Kluiberth Roa Nunez and to repeal Resolution 8610, a resolution that grants Venezuelan authorities to use deadly force against protesters. In Barinas, students of Universidad Santa María protested against the use of deadly force against protesters while also denouncing the killing of Roa Nunez and demanded the repeal of Resolution 8610.
- 26 February – Residents in Mérida protested against the killing of Kluiberth Roa Nunez and sang the National Anthem.
- 27 February – Students began to collect signatures to repeal Resolution 8610, a regulation that allows the use of deadly force to control protests.
- 28 February – Thousands marched in San Cristóbal denouncing the crackdown by President Maduro and the killing of Kluiberth Roa Nunez, with María Corina Machado and Kluiberth's parents participating in the march. Opposition groups began gathering signatures for the National Agreement for the Transition in various cities throughout Venezuela.

== March ==
- 2 March – In Mérida, armed groups of colectivos reportedly attacked the University of Los Andes, supposedly to intimidate the protest site, shooting guns at students and faculty while also holding 3 students hostage and stealing belongings of students. In Valera, Trujillo state, students protested over the death of Kluiberth Roa Nunez which led to clashes between the protesters and Venezuelan authorities.
- 4 March – Protests began in at least six communities between Bolivar state and Delta Amacuro with the communities and their councils complaining about problems with utilities in the area.
- 5 March – Protests over inadequate utilities in the multiple communities between Bolivar state and Delta Amacuro continued for a second day.
- 6 March – Francisco Miranda Avenue near Parque del Este and Parque Cristal in Caracas were blocked by protesters in the evening hours.
- 8 March – While commemorating International Women's Day in Caracas, mothers along with their husbands and children participated in a march led by María Corina Machado, condemning Resolution 8610. Women in Mérida marched denouncing Resolution 8610 and demanded justice for students and young individuals who were killed during the protests.
- 10 March – Students of medicine at the Central University of Venezuela protested against the health crisis in Venezuela and demanded solutions. In Tachira and Valencia, residents also protested against the health crisis demanded improvements in health care centers.
- 11 March – Students at the Central University of Venezuela protested against insecurity in the area.
- 12 March –Rodolfo Gonzalez, a retired commercial pilot arrested for allegedly operating violent protests, commits suicide in the headquarters of SEBIN.
- 16 March – Outside of the National Experimental University of Táchira, an unidentified group of protesters blocked roads and burned a vehicle.
- 17 March – Teachers across Venezuela planned a nationwide strike after Minister of Education, Hector Rodriguez, denied to fix wages that had become inadequate due to the high level of inflation in Venezuela. Protester Christian Holdack, who was processed alongside Leopoldo López, was released from prison.
- 18 March – Three protesters detained since 2014, Julver Pulido, Juan Esqueda and Miguel Ángel Nieto, are released from prison and granted probation.
- 20 March – Three students were arrested while protesting in Altamira Square and were held at the SEBIN headquarters.
- 21 March – Another protest was allegedly arrested by SEBIN plainclothes officers while protesting in Altamira Square. Residents in San José and Rio Chico, Miranda state protested against insecurity and blocked roads following a murder occurring in the area.
- 24 March – After attempted kidnappings and murders of children in neighborhoods of Caracas allegedly for organ harvesting, residents in Petare of the Sucre Municipality and near Altamira protested. Hundreds of motorcyclists protested by blocking streets throughout Caracas and shortly gathered to protest in front of the Venezolana de Television (VTV) headquarters. President Maduro called the allegations false and blamed the opposition of the allegations. Mayor of Sucre, Carlos Ocariz, stated that formal complaints were made concerning the kidnapping of children.
- 25 March – Drivers near Petare protested against insecurity by blocking access to the area with trucks and buses.

== April ==
- 5 April – In acts of protest against the Venezuelan government and the United States government, both pro-government and opposition individuals burned effigies of various officials during some traditional Easter celebrations of the Burning of Judas. Government supporters burned dolls representing United States president Barack Obama and opposition official Henrique Capriles with the preparation of one burning of a President Obama effigy shared on Venezuelan state television. Meanwhile, individuals supporting the opposition burned effigies of President Maduro, Diosdado Cabello and other Venezuelan officials.
- 6 April – Workers of the University Clinical Hospital announced that they may protest again so that their calls for more resources will be heard since dialogue with the Ministry of Health had slowed. In the community of Los Ejidos, residents blocked a road in protest over the lack of water for over six months in the area leaving over 1,550 without water while others protested over the alleged raise of fares for transportation in the area.
- 13 April – Outside of the Ministry of Popular Power for Health, Ministry of Popular Power for Health workers protested for better working and patient conditions and demanded to receive pay they had not received.
- 14 April – In Puerto la Cruz, protesters blocked streets by burning tires in the road near a state-run PDVAL store.
- 15 April – At the Central University of Venezuela, workers protested over disagreements of collective agreements and were cordoned from moving by the National Guard.
- 24 April – Protesters demonstrated outside of a state-run PDVAL market again in Puerto la Cruz after citizens reported that they were withholding appliances from being sold to customers with three men stating that they were attacked by police.
- 25 April – In Caracas, protests occurred on Cafe Avenue, specifically near San Luis Boulevard with individuals denouncing increasing crime in the city.

== May ==
- 1 May – Protesters Pablo Estrada, Eduardo Colmenares, Raul López and Rosa Rivas, all arrested in July 2014, were released according to their lawyers.
- 2 May – Resident of 23 de Enero protested due to the lack of gas in the area which lasted several days.
- 7 May – Central University of Venezuela students protested against insecurity by blocking access to Plaza Venezuela following the murder of a student on the previous day.
- 11 May – Residents of the town of Clarines blocked roads and burned tires in the roads while protesting the lack of water in their homes for over a month, with Mayor Maico Marrero going to the protest and began distributing water with tanker trucks. Citizens of Carabobo protested blocking roads demanding the allocation of homes to them.
- 15 May – Student leader Conan Quintana was robbed and murdered along with another person two blocks away from the Ministry of Interior and Justice headquarters, resulting in immediate protests near the headquarters following the murder.
- 16 May – Over 150 people protested in Caracas outside of the headquarters of the Ministry of Interior and Justice following the murder of Conan Quintana. In Mérida, students also protested against the murder of Quintana blocking Las Américas Avenue, resulting with Polimérida officers firing buckshot at demonstrators in order to disperse them.
- 18 May – In San Bernardino, mothers of cancer patients protested outside of Jose Manuel de los Rios Children's Hospital due to the lack of care for their children who had not received treatment for at least five months.
- 19 May – Hundreds of people protested in Táchira for various causes ranging from payments to utility issues.
- 23 May – Following a report that opposition leader Daniel Ceballos was being moved to one of Venezuela's most violent public prisons, Cabellos and Leopoldo López announced that they were beginning a hunger strike and called on Venezuelans to conduct a mass-protest the next week.
- 26 May – About 500 educational workers protested outside of Miraflores Palace and demanded that a representative of President Maduro hear about their complications with pay and benefits.
- 27 May – The opposition coalition announced that they would not participate in the 30 May demonstrations, though opposition leader Henrique Capriles stated he would personally participate.
- 28 May – Hundreds of students in Zulia marched demanding respect to human rights and more security. Taxi drivers in Petare in Caracas protested against insecurity blocking roads in the neighborhood.
- 30 May – About 200,000 Venezuelans protested throughout the country by marching in cities like Maracaibo, Valencia, Barquisimeto and Caracas to demand the release of those arrested during the preceding protests and to pressure the Venezuelan government into setting a date for the congressional elections, fearing that government will cancel the vote to maintain power.

== June ==
- 8 June – A group of students from the Federation of University Centers of the University of Zulia began a hunger strike to bring international attention to the crisis in Venezuela.
- 11 June – The National Guard arrested seven opposition leaders who wanted to start a hunger strike in front of the National Electoral Council (CNE) headquarters in Caracas.
- 14 June – Hunger strikers at the Maria Auxiliadora in Trujillo were allegedly attacked by Venezuelan authorities.
- 18 June – Brazilian senators, including Ronaldo Caiado and Aécio Neves, denounce that they were unable to visit Leopoldo López due to having their access blocked and being attacked by government supporters. Farmers in Araure held a march demanding the Venezuelan government to make actions combatting shortages and criticized the frequent changing of ministers.
- 19 June – Empresas Polar workers protested against the Venezuelan government, denouncing the lack of raw materials and the refusal to distribute needed currency to the company.
- 22 June – A caravan of public transportation drivers protested on Prados del Este highway due to the shortages of parts and tires, stating they would deliver a letter to the Interior Minister at Plaza Venezuela.
- 23 June – Leopoldo Lopez ended his hunger strike after one of his demands, the announcement of parliamentary elections, was fulfilled when the National Electoral Council declared the holding of elections on 6 December for MPs of the National Assembly. Other organizations ended their nearly month-long hunger strikes along with Lopez.
- 25 June – On Margarita Island, residents who had to wait in lines at markets like the government-run PDVAL and Makro began to protest blocking roads.
- 26 June – A march was held from the headquarters of Ciudad Banesco in Monte Bello to Chacaito Brion Square that was organized by the National Journalists Council (CNP) and the Federation of University Teachers of Venezuela (FAPUV). The groups of journalists demonstrated for freedom of expression and to denounce attacks on journalists.
- 29 June – Motorcycle taxi drivers protested in front of the headquarters of the governor of Lara state, denouncing alleged harassment from Venezuelan authorities.

== July ==
- 16 July – Ministry of Environment and Housing workers protested demanding President Maduro to increase their salaries.
- 17 July – In Barinas residents protested, blocking a route to Mérida due to the lack of food and basic necessities demanding Mayor Luis Henriquez of the Bolivar municipality to perform the necessary acts to acquire such goods.
- 20 July – In Catia, residents protested against insecurity and demanded that Venezuelan authorities initiate patrols in the area to combat crime.

== August ==
- 8 August – A demonstration against shortages in Venezuela was held in eastern Caracas following the death of man during looting. The protest involved hundreds of people, though the number of those participating was smaller than previous demonstrations possibly due to Venezuelans being preoccupied with finding food and other products.

== See also ==
- Protests against Nicolás Maduro
- Timeline of the 2014 Venezuelan protests
- Timeline of the 2016 Venezuelan protests
- Timeline of the 2017 Venezuelan protests
- Timeline of the 2018 Venezuelan protests
- Timeline of the 2019 Venezuelan protests
