= Robinson 2001 =

- Season 1
- Presented by: Roberto Messuti
- No. of days: 43
- No. of castaways: 16
- Winner: Gabriel Pérez
- Runner-up: Antonio Tranchino
- Location: Bocas del Toro, Panama
- No. of episodes: 15

Release
- Original network: Venevisión
- Original release: May 27, 2001 – 2001

Season chronology
- Next → Season 2

Robinson: La Gran Aventura 2001 was the first season of Robinson: La Gran Aventura, the Venezuelan version of the Swedish show Expedition Robinson that was aired in 2001. The season was filmed in the Bocas del Toro archipelago of Panama.

== Season summary ==
During the premerge portion of the game, the teams proved to be equally strong. When it came time to merge, a twist was added to the game. This twist would allow for the person who had immunity at any given tribal council to break any tie votes. At the first post merge tribal council both the former North team and former South team members stayed loyal to their original tribes which led to a tie in votes. As Gabriel Pérez from the South team had immunity he cast his vote to eliminate former North team member Nelson. Following this initial tribal council, the South team began to pick off the remaining members of the North team one by one until only six contestants were left in the game when two of the former South team members along with the remaining North team members voted for the leader of the South team alliance Darío González which eventually led to his elimination.

When it came time for the final four the contestants took part in two challenges in order to determine who would make the final two. Gabriel Pérez won the first of these challenges and advanced to the final two while Verónica Pinto was eliminated for losing the challenge. Antonio Tranchino won the second challenge and also advanced to the final two while Annalisse "Ana" Acosta lost and became the final member of the jury. Ultimately, it was Gabriel Pérez who won this season over Antonio Tranchino with a jury vote of 6-1.

== Finishing order ==
| Contestant | Original Tribes | Merged Tribe | Finish |
|---|---|---|---|
| Sorange Castillo; 29, Margarita | South Team | | 1st Voted Out; Day 3 |
| Marty Zilio; 35, Caracas | North Team | | 2nd Voted Out; Day 6 |
| Wanda Villavicencio; 40, Caracas | South Team | | 3rd Voted Out; Day 9 |
| Lorraine Rivers; 41, Caracas | North Team | | 4th Voted Out; Day 12 |
| Sebastian Sortino; 24, Caracas | North Team | | 5th Voted Out; Day 15 |
| Edgar Cerezo; 27, Caracas | South Team | | 6th Voted Out; Day 18 |
| Nelson Cuartas; 29, Valencia | North Team | Robinson | 7th Voted Out; Day 21 |
| Lilian Tintori; 22, Caracas | North Team | Robinson | 8th Voted Out; 1st Jury Member; Day 24 |
| Gregory Urdaneta; 29, Mérida | North Team | Robinson | 9th Voted Out; 2nd Jury Member; Day 27 |
| Darío González; 36, Caracas | South Team | Robinson | 10th Voted Out; 3rd Jury Member; Day 30 |
| Gabo Chacón; 27, San Cristóbal | South Team | Robinson | 11th Voted Out; 4th Jury Member; Day 33 |
| María Eusebia Díaz; 23, Bolívar | South Team | Robinson | 12th Voted Out; 5th Jury Member; Day 36 |
| Verónica Pinto; 25, Caracas | North Team | Robinson | Lost Challenge; 6th Jury Member; Day 39 |
| Annalisse “Ana” Acosta; 23, Maracaibo | South Team | Robinson | Lost Challenge; 7th Jury Member; Day 42 |
| Antonio Tranchino; 41, Caracas | North Team | Robinson | Runner-Up; Day 43 |
| Gabriel Pérez; 25, Caracas | South Team | Robinson | Sole Survivor; Day 43 |
