= Robinson 2003 =

- Season 2
- Presented by: Roberto Messuti
- No. of days: 39
- No. of castaways: 16
- Winner: Graciela Boza
- Runner-up: Raúl Arreaza
- Location: Patagonia, Argentina
- No. of episodes: 13

Release
- Original network: Venevisión
- Original release: March 26 – June 18, 2003

Season chronology
- ← Previous; Robinson 2001

Robinson: La Gran Aventura 2003 was the second season of Robinson: La Gran Aventura, the Venezuelan version of the Swedish show Expedition Robinson and it aired from 26 March 2003 to 18 June 2003. Unlike any previous season, this season took place in a Patagonian Mountain (Argentina).

== Season summary ==
During the premerge portion of the game, the South team dominated at the immunity challenges, winning all five, while the North team lost most of its members. Due to the numbers gap of 8–3 between the two tribes, they were merged when there were eleven players left in the game. Following the merger, the former South team members began to turn against each other leading to five of its former members being voted out of the competition. Following the elimination of the first jury member Carlos Correa, the black vote came into play. The black vote gave the person eliminated at one tribal council the power to vote at the next.

When it came time for the final four, the contestants competed in two challenges. The winner of the first challenge, Raúl Arreaza, had to vote out one of the losers. He chose to eliminate the only member of the North team remaining in the game, Alfredo Gago. The final three then took part in a final challenge in which the loser would be eliminated. Alberto Vincentelli lost the challenge and was eliminated from the game. Ultimately, it was Graciela Boza won this season over Raúl Arreaza with a jury vote of 4–3.

== Finishing order ==
Contestant	Original Tribes	Merged Tribe	Finish
Maria Elena Amado; 22, Maracaibo	North Team		1st Voted Out; Day 3
Beatriz Pirela; 23, Valencia	North Team		2nd Voted Out; Day 6
Richard Hernández; 23, Maracay	North Team		3rd Voted Out; Day 9
Rafael Cabrera; 48, Calabozo	North Team		4th Voted Out; Day 12
Goretti De Abreu; 34, Caracas	North Team		5th Voted Out; Day 15
Raquel Taín; 22, Caracas	South Team	Robinson	6th Voted Out; Day 18
Luis Zeppenfeldt; 37, Mérida	South Team	Robinson	7th Voted Out; Day 21
Carlos Correa; 24, Caracas	South Team	Robinson	8th Voted Out; 1st Jury Member; Day 24
Rhoda van Praag; 24, Maracaibo	South Team	Robinson	10th Voted Out; 2nd Jury Member; Day 27
Bibi Kabche; 27, Maracaibo	South Team	Robinson	11th Voted Out; 3rd Jury Member; Day 30
Ángel Mieres; 21, Caracas	North Team	Robinson	12th Voted Out; 4th Jury Member; Day 33
Lissette Rojas; 32, Caracas	North Team	Robinson	13th Voted Out; 5th Jury Member; Day 36
Alfredo Gago; 21, Caracas	North Team	Robinson	14th Voted Out; 6th Jury Member; Day 37
Alberto Vincentelli; 28, Barquisimeto	South Team	Robinson	Lost Challenge; 7th Jury Member; Day 38
Raúl Arreaza; 21, Caracas	South Team	Robinson	Runner-Up; Day 39
Graciela Boza; 34, Maracay	South Team	Robinson	Sole Survivor; Day 39

== Voting history ==
	Original Tribes						Merged Tribe										
Episode #:	1		2	3	4	5	6	7	8	9	10	11	12	13			
Eliminated:	Tie	Maria Elena; 4/6 votes^{1}	Beatriz; 4/7 votes	Richard; 5/6 votes	Rafael; 3/5 votes	Goretti; 3/4 votes	Raquel; 8/11 votes	Luis; 9/10 votes	Carlos; 5/9 votes	Rhoda; 6/9 votes^{2}	Bibi; 6/8 votes^{2}	Ángel; 4/7 votes^{2}	Lissette; 3/6 votes^{2}	Alfredo; 1/1 votes	Alberto; No vote	Raúl; 3/7 votes	Graciela; 4/7 votes
Voter	Vote																
Graciela							Raquel	Luis	Bibi	Rhoda	Bibi	Ángel	Lissette			Jury Vote	
Raúl							Raquel	Luis	Bibi	Bibi	Bibi	Ángel	Lissette	Alfredo		Jury Vote	
Alberto							Raquel	Luis	Bibi	Rhoda	Bibi	Ángel	Lissette				Graciela
Alfredo	Maria Elena	Maria Elena	Rafael	Richard	Rafael	Goretti	Raquel	Luis	Carlos	Rhoda	Bibi	Raúl	Graciela				Graciela
Lissette	Beatriz	Beatriz	Beatriz	Richard	Rafael	Goretti	Raquel	Luis	Carlos	Rhoda	Bibi	Raúl	Alfredo				Graciela
Ángel	Beatriz	Maria Elena	Beatriz	Richard	Alfredo	Goretti	Raquel	Luis	Carlos	Rhoda	Bibi	Raúl	Raúl				Graciela
Bibi							Luis	Luis	Carlos	Alberto	Alberto	Ángel				Raúl	
Rhoda							Raquel	Luis	Carlos	Bibi	Graciela					Raúl	
Carlos							Raquel	Luis	Bibi	Rhoda						Raúl	
Luis							Bibi	Bibi									
Raquel							Luis										
Goretti	Maria Elena	Maria Elena	Beatriz	Richard	Rafael	Ángel											
Rafael	Maria Elena	Maria Elena	Ángel	Richard	Alfredo												
Richard	Beatriz	Beatriz	Beatriz	Rafael													
Beatriz	Maria Elena	None	Ángel														
Maria Elena	Beatriz	None															

^1 At the first tribal council both Maria Elena and Beatriz received four votes. Following a re-vote, Maria Elena received more votes than Beatriz and was eliminated.

^2 Starting with the ninth tribal council and continuing until the twelfth tribal council, the contestant voted out at the previous tribal council was permitted to vote.
