= Resolution 8610 =

Venezuelan legislation

On 27 January 2015, the Minister of Defense of Venezuela, Vladimir Padrino López, signed Resolution 8610 which stated that the "use of potentially lethal force, along with the firearm or another potentially lethal weapon" could be used as a last resort by the Venezuelan armed forces "to prevent disorders, support the legitimately constituted authority and reject any aggression, facing it immediately and the necessary means". The resolution conflicted with Article 68 of the Venezuelan Constitution that states, "the use of firearms and toxic substances to control peaceful demonstrations is prohibited. The law shall regulate the actions of the police and security in the control of public order".

The resolution caused outrage among some Venezuelans which resulted in protests against Resolution 8610, especially after the death of 14-year-old Kluiberth Roa Nunez, which had protests days after his death numbering in the thousands. Students, academics and human rights groups condemned the resolution. International entities had expressed concern with Resolution 8610 as well, including the Government of Canada which stated that it was "concerned by the decision of the Government of Venezuela to authorize the use of deadly force against demonstrators" while the European Parliament demanded the repeal of the resolution entirely.

Days after the introduction of the resolution, Padrino López stated that critics "decontextualized" the decree calling it "the most beautiful document of profound respect for human rights to life and even the protesters". On 7 March 2015, Padrino López later announced that the Venezuelan government was expanding on Resolution 8610 to give more detailed explanations and that the decree "should be regulated and reviewed".
