= Robinson: La Gran Aventura =

- Created by: Charlie Parsons
- Country of origin: Venezuela
- Original language: Spanish
- No. of seasons: 2

Original release
- Network: Venevision
- Release: 2001 – 2003

Related
- Survivor

Robinson: La Gran Aventura is a popular television show that aired in Venezuela from 2001 to 2002. It was one of the first editions of Robinson, or Survivor as it is referred to in some countries, to air outside Europe. The show was a huge success in Venezuela, however after only two seasons, the show was canceled due to its high production cost. The name alludes to both Robinson Crusoe and The Swiss Family Robinson, two stories featuring people marooned by shipwrecks.

== Format ==
The Robinson format was developed by Planet 24, a United Kingdom TV production company owned by Charlie Parsons and Bob Geldof. Their company Castaway Television Productions retained the rights to the concept when they sold Planet 24 in 1999. Mark Burnett later licensed the format to create the American show Survivor in 2000.

Sixteen contestants are put into a survival situation and compete in a variety of physical challenges. Early in each season three teams compete but later on the teams are merged and the competitions become individual. At the end of each show one contestant is eliminated from the show by the others in a secret "island council" ballot.

== Seasons ==
Year	Channel	Participants	Winner
2001	Venevision	16	Gabriel Pérez
2003	Venevision	16	Graciela Boza
