= Lilian Tintori =

Venezuelan activist (born 1978)

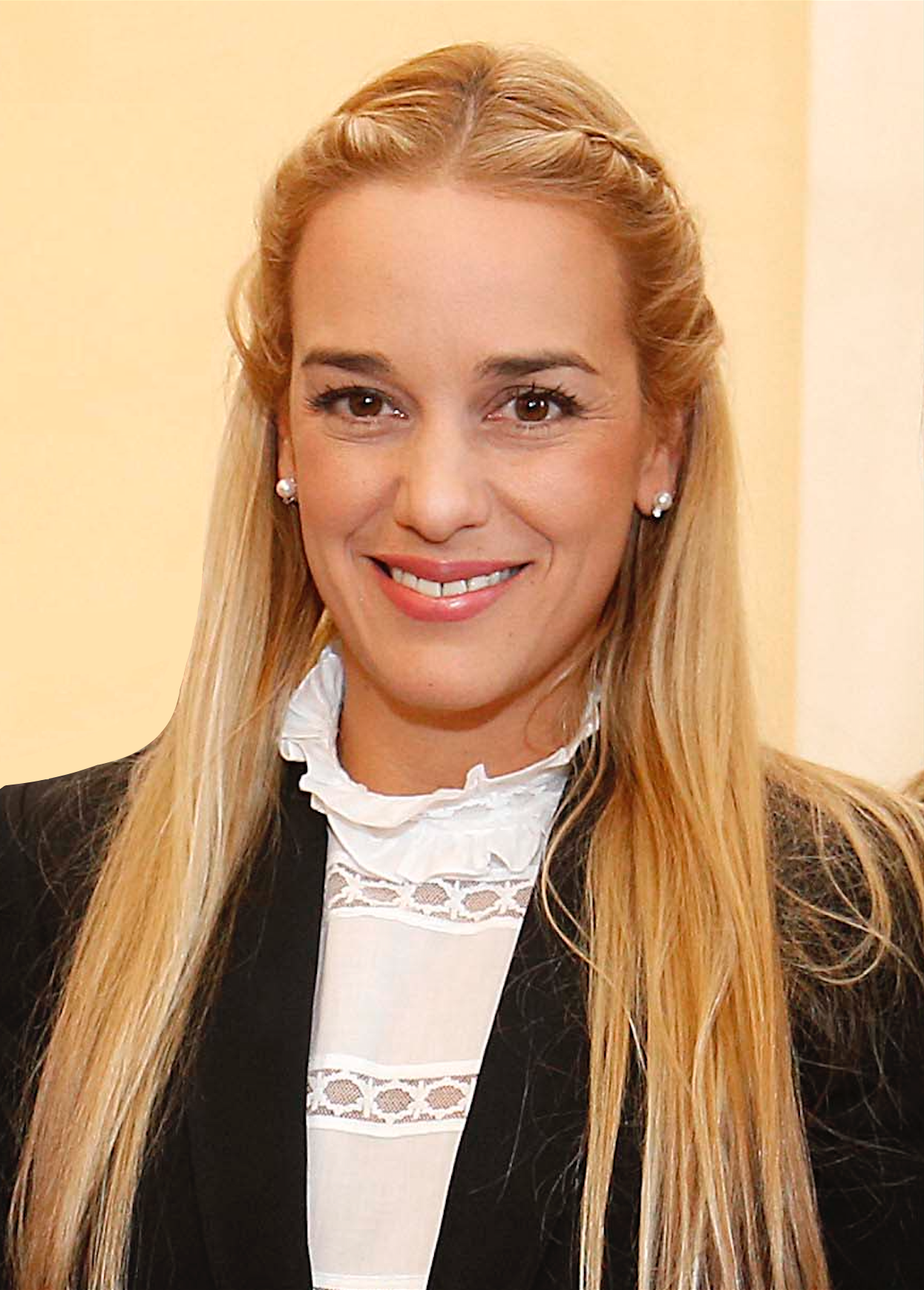

Personal details
- Born: 5 May 1978 (age 48) Caracas, Venezuela
- Spouse: Leopoldo López Mendoza
- Children: 3
- Education: Andrés Bello Catholic University
- Profession: Activist

Lilian Adriana Tintori Parra (born 5 May 1978) is a Venezuelan activist, athlete, and television and radio host. Tintori is married to Leopoldo López, a Venezuelan politician sentenced in 2015 to nearly 14 years in prison for inciting violence during street protests the year before. She has also led groups who have opposed the government of Venezuelan President Nicolás Maduro.

== Early life and education ==
Tintori was born in Caracas, Venezuela on 5 May 1978. Her mother is Venezuelan and her father is of Italian descent. She studied at Merici Academy. She earned a bachelor's degree in preschool education with a minor in political communications from the Andrés Bello Catholic University.

== Career ==
=== Entertainment ===
In 2001, Tintori was part of the reality TV Show Robinson: La Gran Aventura. The show was a big success in Venezuela. Even though Tintori did not win, this experience helped her build a career in the entertainment industry. Tintori was a television host for RCTV and Televen, a former radio personality for La Mega, Hot 94, and Ateneo 100.7. Eventually, Tintori's face was seen on billboards in Venezuela. Tintori was Venezuela's 2003 Kitesurfing National Champion.

=== Human rights ===
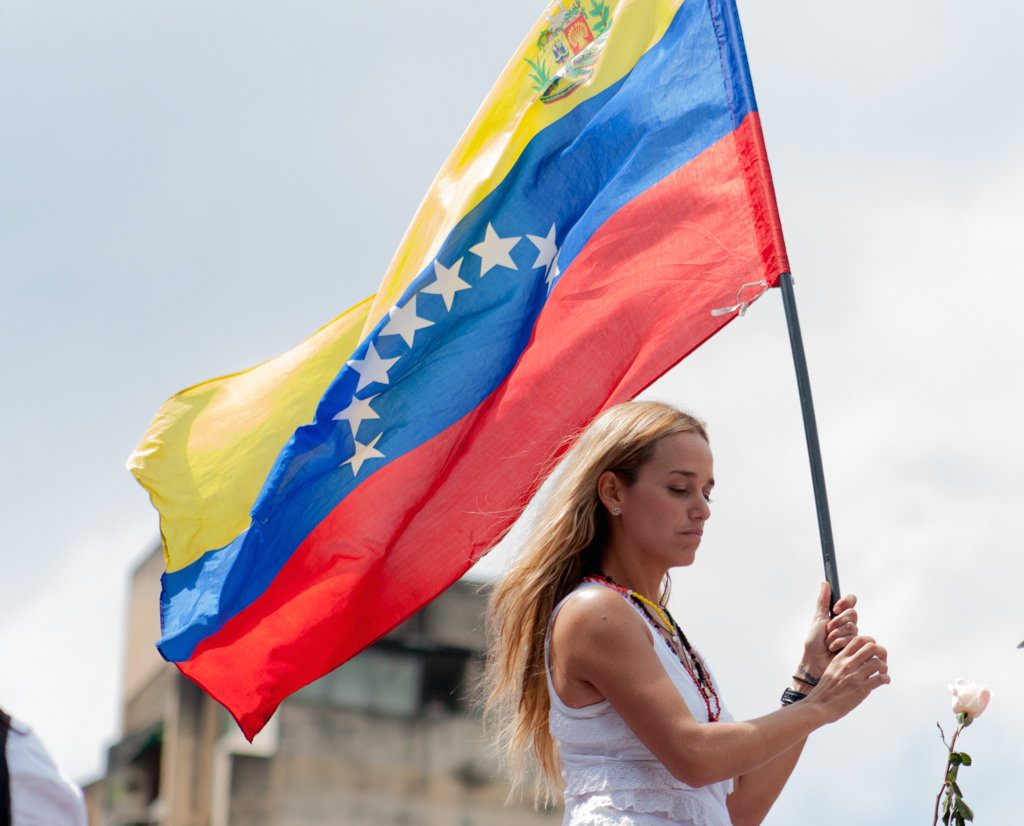
Tintori holding a flag during a protest in Venezuela

Following the arrest of her husband during the 2014 Venezuelan protests, Tintori became a face of Venezuela's opposition movement. On 14 June 2017, Tintori was awarded the 2017 Palabra Prize. In an op-ed for The Washington Post, she denied interest in politics while telling The Atlantic that "Leopoldo is the politician ... I'm a human-rights activist, a Venezuelan, a mother, and a victim myself, and I'm very close to the victims of my country." She traveled internationally to meet with individuals such as then United States vice president Joe Biden, Spanish prime minister Mariano Rajoy, and Pope Francis, to seek assistance with the releasing her husband and other political prisoners in Venezuela.

Venezuelan President Nicolás Maduro sees Tintori as a threat and has called for her work to be "neutralized" and described her as a "terrorist". According to Tintori, Venezuelan authorities often follow her and intimidate her daily. While visiting her husband López in prison, she, as well as her mother-in-law, have been forced to undergo "intimate" strip searches by Venezuelan authorities, with Tintori's children present at times.

On 29 August 2017, the forensic police of Venezuela (CICPC) stated that they found 200 million bolívares in cash–around 10,000 USD at that time–split in four wooden boxes in a car belonging to Tintori. Tintori and two vice presidents of the bank BOD were prohibited from leaving the country during the investigation. Tintori assured that the money was for personal use (to pay a doctor for her mother) and expressed that the Venezuelan government was attempting to prevent her from going on an international tour to meet with European leaders. On 2 September 2017, she was prevented from leaving for Europe, prompting French President Emmanuel Macron to tweet his support.

== Personal life ==
On 19 April 2007, Tintori married Leopoldo López. They have three children: Manuela Rafaela, born in 2009; Leopoldo Santiago, born in 2013; and Federica Antonieta, born in 2018.

== Awards and honors ==
- 2003 – Venezuelan Kitesurfing National Champion
- 2014 – Honor of Merit, Freedom and Democracy at the 6th World Summit for Communication Policy in Mexico "for her struggle for human rights and democracy in Venezuela and Latin America".
- 2017 – 2017 Palabra Prize, in recognition for her work in favor of democracy and peace. The award, presented by the Spanish Federation of Journalist Associations (Federación de Asociaciones de Periodistas de España, FAPE), with the sponsorship of the César Egido Foundation, had an endowment of 10,000 euros.
