= Timeline of the 2019 Venezuelan protests =

Overview of events

The 2019 Venezuelan protests began in the first days of January as a result of the Venezuelan presidential crisis. Protests against the legitimacy of the Nicolás Maduro's presidency began at the time of his second inauguration following a controversial presidential election in 2018. Rallies of support were also held for President of the National Assembly, Juan Guaidó, with some Venezuelans and foreign government's recognizing him as the acting President of Venezuela.

== January ==
- 10 January – Nicolás Maduro is inaugurated for his second presidential term by the Supreme Tribunal of Justice.
- 11 January – The first open cabildo, a rally in the streets of Caracas, is held by National Assembly president Juan Guaidó, with many gathered there protesting against the failures of the Bolivarian government of Nicolás Maduro. The National Assembly declares that Guaidó is the acting President of Venezuela under the constitution and Guaidó calls more mass demonstrations on 23 January 2019, the 61st anniversary of the 1958 Venezuelan coup d'état. Maduro responded by calling the opposition a group of "little boys" while prison minister Iris Varela stated that she had begun to prepare prison cells for the opposition.
- 13 January – Guaidó is detained by the Bolivarian Intelligence Service (SEBIN), but is released 45 minutes later. Two journalists were also detained on-air while covering SEBIN's actions towards Guaidó: Beatriz Adrián of Caracol Televisión and Osmary Hernández of CNN. The twelve SEBIN officials involved were imprisoned days later.
- 15 January – Minister of Defense Vladimir Padrino López declares loyalty to Maduro, stating that he would give his life for him. In Valencia, Carabobo thousands of residents participate in open cabildos filling Plaza Prebo and its surrounding streets.
- 17 January – A group of Venezuelan ex-army and police officers in Peru announced their support for Guaidó, saying that they do not recognise Maduro as their president or leader.
- 18 January – Thousands of Venezuelans gathered in Carabobo to support Guaidó at open cabildo rallies in Valencia and other cities throughout the state.
- 19 January – Across 12 states, thousands of Venezuelans demonstrate in support of Guaidó calling for a "transitional government", with some Maduro loyalists attempting to assault attendees with sticks and machetes in areas such as Petare, Maracay and Zulia.
- 21 January – In San José de Cotiza, north of Caracas, over two dozen National Guardsmen participate in a mutiny against Maduro with the assistance of residents in the area during the early morning hours and are later captured by Venezuelan authorities. During the night, over thirty communities in Caracas and surrounding areas participated in strong protests against the Maduro government. The strongest protests occurred in San José de Cotiza, where the rebel National Guardsmen were arrested, with demonstrations spreading throughout nearby communities, with cacerolazos heard throughout Caracas. One woman who was confused for a protester was killed in San José de Cotiza by members of a colectivo, who stole her phone.
- 22 January – Protests throughout Caracas from the previous evening continue into the morning, resulting in the National Guard and National Police being deployed, with reports of tear gas being fired into streets and residential facilities.
- 23 January — A 16-year-old boy, Alixon Pizani, is killed a statue of Chávez is set on fire, and three people are killed in Bolívar in separate overnight protests, leading into the day of national protest.
- 24 January — Minister of Defense Vladimir Padrino López states to the Venezuelan public that a coup is in progress and thanked governments supporting Maduro for "promoting a dialogue, a constitutional solution". Cacerolazos continue throughout Caracas and authorities loyal to Maduro search homes to arrest protesters.
- 25 January — As protests continue, Guaidó calls for a continuous protest, also encouraging the people to keep up the fight if he gets arrested.
- 26 January – Venezuelan military diplomat in Washington DC, Colonel Jose Luis Silva defected from Maduro government and urge his fellow FANB to recognize Guaidó presidency.
- 29 January – US Secretary of State transfers control of Venezuelan Government assets to acting president Juán Guaidó. Soon afterwards, Venezuelan Supreme Court barred Guaidó from leaving the country and froze his bank accounts.
- 30 January – Thousands attend pro-Maduro government rally in Falcon state in the northern part of the country.
- 31 January – Self-declared Venezuelan acting president Juan Guaidó is supposed to be in secret talks with the country's military as he attempts to force Nicolas Maduro from power.

== February ==
- 1 February – Amid rumors that Venezuela is selling gold to UAE, Guaido is said he would defy a government ban on humanitarian aid by sending large convoys of medicine into Venezuela with the assistance of neighboring nations. Overtures would have been made to Russia and China arguing that the two countries’ interests would be best served by switching the side they back in Venezuela.

External images
- Satellite images of a Guaidó rally on 2 February 2019, 11:05 AM VET
- Satellite images of a Maduro rally on 2 February 2019, 11:05 AM VET

- 2 February - Opposition protesters filled the Las Mercedes Avenue in Caracas. A rally was also held in support of the Venezuelan government. The rally was held on the 20-year anniversary of Hugo Chávez's first inauguration. A general from the Venezuelan Air Force, General Francisco Esteban Yanez Rodriguez defected from the government and announced his support to Guaidó presidency. Plans by Venezuelan officials to ship 20 tons of gold have reportedly been halted due to international pressure. The blocking of the shipment comes a week after the Bank of England denied Maduro's request to withdraw US$1.2 billion of gold stored there.
- 4 February – Seven countries of European Union decided to recognize Guaidó after Maduro rejected the 8 days ultimatum.
- 5 February – The Lima Group urged the Venezuelan military to support opposition leader Juan Guaidó as acting president. while Pope Francis said that he is willing to mediate between Venezuela's rival presidents Nicolas Maduro and Juan Guaido, but only if both sides request his help.
- 7 February – Venezuela's armed forces have barricaded a bridge on the country's western border with Colombia, in an attempt to prevent a delivery of humanitarian aid.
- 10 February – Venezuelan opposition leader Juan Guaidó has vowed to open humanitarian aid routes with volunteer support into the country in defiance of the government the following week.
- 11 February – Groups of motorcyclists belonging to colectivos drive past the Embassy of the United States, Caracas in an apparent demonstration.
- 12 February – Opposition launched another protest demanding entry of humanitarian aid.
- 13 February – Acting President Juan Guaidó appoints new board of PDVSA subsidiary in United States, Citgo.
- 20 February – Deputy U.N. military attache, Colonel Pedro Chirinos became the latest military personnel to defect from the government.
- 21 February – Acting President Juan Guaidó leads a caravan to the Colombian border city of Cúcuta along with other deputies. Hugo Carvajal, former head of DGCIM announced his defection from the government.
- 23 February – Thousands of protesters in Caracas demonstrate near the Generalissimo Francisco de Miranda Air Base. Four GNB troops including the sergeant defected to Colombia by crossing the Simón Bolívar International Bridge, they were welcomed by Colombian authorities. Colectivos killed four and injure twenty-four during border conflicts in Santa Elena de Uairén. On the Brazilian border, a Venezuelan Army guard post was attacked with molotov cocktails and stones. At least 285 people were injured and 4 reported dead as a result of the clashes. Maduro severs relations with Colombia and expels its diplomats from Venezuela.
- 25 February – Colombian authorities confirmed 270 Venezuelan troops defected to Colombia in another wave of defection .
- 28 February – About 400 Venezuelan troops had defected to neighbor countries.

== March ==
- 4 March – Acting President Juan Guaidó arrived in Simón Bolívar International Airport, Maiquetía welcomed by diplomats from allied nations
- 7 March – First nationwide blackout.
- 9 March – Large protest in Caracas against the government for the lack of water and electricity.
- 14 March – Most regions recover from blackout.
- 18 March – Army general Carlos Rotondaro, who had been under sanctions by the United States since 2018, defected to Colombia and recognized Guaidó as Venezuela's president.
- 21 March – Roberto Marrero, Guaidó's chief of staff, is detained.
- 25 March – Second wave of blackouts starts.
- 30-31 March – Large protests in several regions against government for lack of water and electricity.

== April ==
- 6 April – Large nationwide protest called by Guaidó and part of Operation Freedom to oust Maduro from power. Tens of thousands of persons participated. Maracaibo protest were repressed by tear gas and rubber bullets.
- 16 April – The first shipment of humanitarian aid of the Red Cross arrives in Venezuela.
- 26 April – National Assembly member Gilber Caro is detained, violating his parliamentary immunity.
- 30 April – Venezuelan uprising and clashes. Guaidó and armed forces personnel loyal to him release Leopoldo López from house arrest.

== May ==
- 1 May – Thousands of supporters showed up for demonstrations on 1 May for Guaidó.
- 2 May – From 30 April to this date, there were 230 wounded in the protests, 205 arrests, and four dead.
- 8 May – National Assembly vice president Edgar Zambrano is arrested.

== June–July ==
- 19–22 June – OHCHR chief, Michelle Bachelet visits Venezuela. Protests broke out in front of the United Nations office in Caracas on 22 June.
- 2 July – Attack of Rufo Chacón
- 5 July – Thousands join pro-Guaidó rally on Caracas to challenge Maduro Fifth of July parade after the death of Rafael Acosta Arévalo, tortured during detention.

== November ==
- 16 November – Guaidó calls for the return of national protests. The pacific rallies gathered about a thousands of his supporters in Caracas and in Maracaibo. A counter-protest organized by Nicolás Maduro administration marched in solidarity to Evo Morales for the events of the 2019 Bolivian political crisis.
